= Saint-Clément-de-Rivière =

- Commune
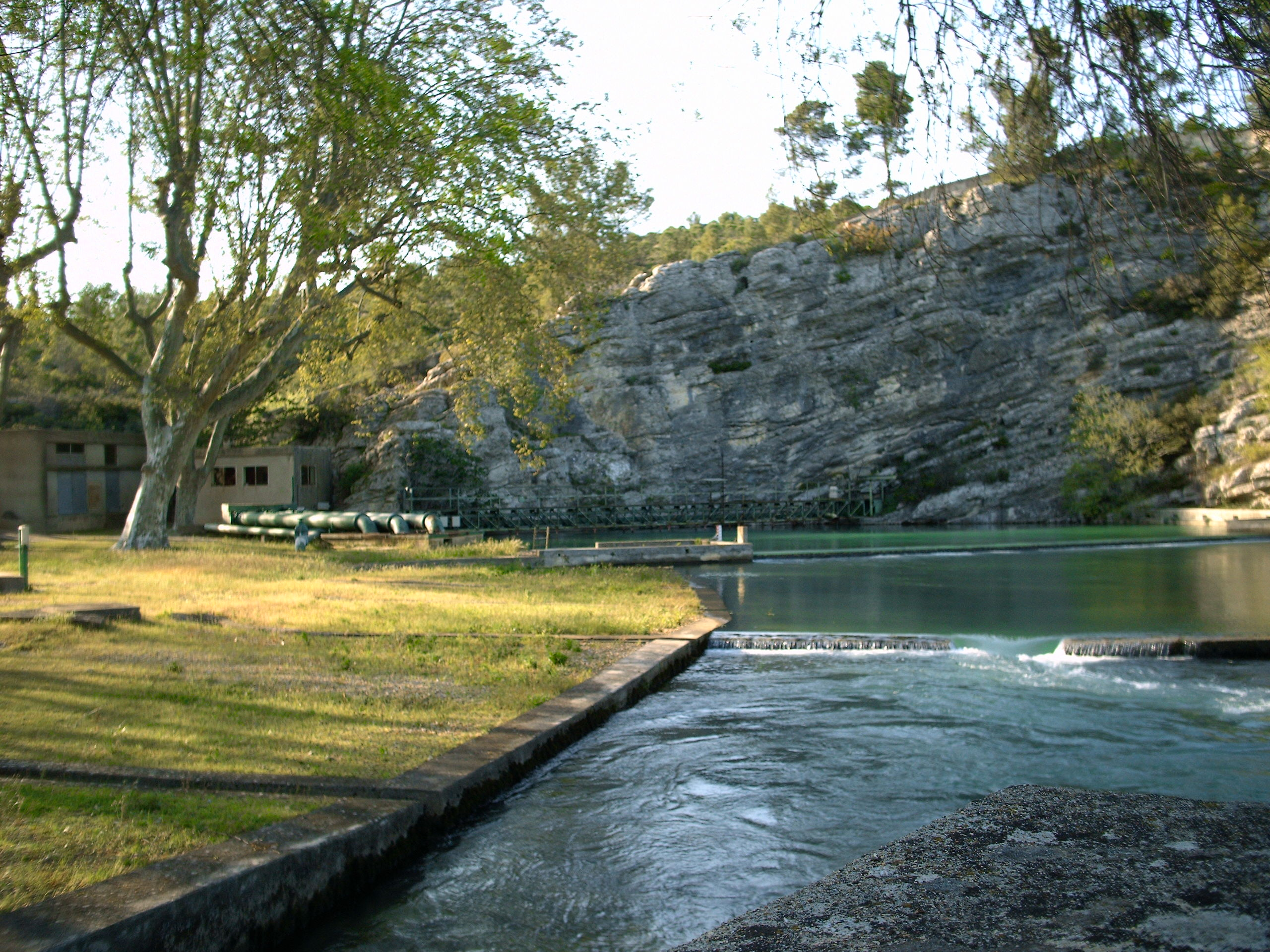
- Source of the river Lez

- Coat of arms
- Location of Saint-Clément-de-Rivière
- Location within France Location within Occitanie
- Coordinates: 43°41′04″N 3°50′50″E
- Country: France
- Region: Occitania
- Department: Hérault
- Arrondissement: Lodève
- Canton: Saint-Gély-du-Fesc

Government
  - Mayor (2022–2026): Jérôme Pouget
- Area^{1}: 12.73 km^{2} (4.92 sq mi)
- Elevation: 64 m (210 ft)
- Highest elevation: 146 m (479 ft)
- Lowest elevation: 46 m (151 ft)
- Population (2023): 5,218
  - Density: 409.9/km^{2} (1,062/sq mi)
- Time zone: UTC+01:00 (CET)
  - Summer (DST): UTC+02:00 (CEST)
- INSEE/Postal code: 34247 /34980
- ^{1} French Land Register data, which excludes lakes, ponds, glaciers > 1 km^{2} (0.386 sq mi or 247 acres) and river estuaries.

Saint-Clément-de-Rivière (French pronunciation: [sɛ̃ klemɑ̃ də ʁivjɛʁ]; Languedocien: Sant Clamenç, before 1985: Saint-Clément) is a municipality located close to Montpellier, in the Hérault department in the Occitanie region in southern France.

== Geography ==
Saint-Clément-de-Rivière is located at about 10 km north from Montpellier. The town has also common limits with several other municipalities: Les Matelles in the north, Prades-le-Lez in the east, Montferrier-sur-Lez in the south-east, Grabels in the south-west and finally Saint-Gély-du-Fesc in the west. The town is 8 km long from north to south, and its total surface is 12.7 km^{2}. The part of the city near Montpellier welcomes a commercial complex called the shopping mall Trifontaine, with a big supermarket and other diversified shops. Saint-Clément-de-Rivière is still covered by a much forest, scrubland and also by crops, even if some areas are now ready to welcome new accommodation buildings and residences. The Saint Sauveur forest has for example seen the construction of the middle and high schools as well as a private hospital. The center of the town called Le Boulidou was designed by François Spoerry, architect of Port Grimaud too. It includes an area where inhabitants can find basic services and goods, such as a bakery, a hairdresser... and also a space with many private houses painted with Mediterranean colors. The river Lez has its source on the territory of Saint-Clément-de-Rivière, in the north, in the Saint Sauveur forest, and then continues its way through some villages and crosses the city of Montpellier to finally end in the Mediterranean Sea.

== Population ==
Historical population
Year	Pop.	±% p.a.
1968	236	—
1975	948	+21.98%
1982	2,100	+12.03%
1990	4,242	+9.19%
1999	4,581	+0.86%
2007	5,040	+1.20%
2012	4,867	−0.70%
2017	4,877	+0.04%
2023	5,218	+1.13%
Source: INSEE

The average household size is 2.10, and 34% of households are single persons.

== History ==
The first signs of life in Saint-Clément-de-Rivière territory were dated from 2300 before Christ, according to some excavations. The oldest site on the territory is the Cave of Hortus, which seems to come from the Paleolithic era, but not so many signs from the period before -2300 were found. This cave revealed the presence of a sedentary peasant population, living from cereal crops, hunting and breeding. The major part of this cave was unfortunately destroyed during the construction of the road connecting two parts of the town. The name of Saint Clément appeared for the first time en 1109, and has been modified a few times to become Saint-Clément-de-Rivière. It makes a reference to Saint Patron Clément who was one of the first authors of the Church, their texts were found in manuscripts of the New Testament. Saint-Clément-de-Rivière was one of the municipalities supporting the « Republic of Montferrand», established during the 1270s to struggle against the Lord of Montpellier which wanted to tax those small villages. In this Republic of Montferrand, women had the right to vote and the universal suffrage was practiced to elect Mayors and their Councillors. This entity was made of nine parishes : Saint-Clément-de-Rivière, Saint-Gély-du-Fesc, Saint-Mathieu-de-Tréviers, Les Matelles, Saint-Vincent-de-Barbeyrargues, Saint-Jean-de-Cuculles, Valflaunès, Combaillaux and Cazevieille. Nowadays, those municipalities are still united in a community called « Communauté de communes du Grand Pic Saint-Loup », which counts 36 members as of 2024. During the 17th century, the project of building an aqueduct from a source of Saint-Clément-de-Rivière to the center of Montpellier appeared, in order to provide water to the population of the city. Construction according to Henri Pitot's plans began in 1753 and ended ten years after. The aqueduct was then made longer to begin at the Lez's source, also on the territory of the town. The aqueduct was used from 1766 until the 1970s.

== Politics ==
From 1983 to 2014, Alphonse Cacciaguera was the mayor of Saint-Clément-de-Rivière, part of the political party RPR which turned into UMP. Between 2014 and 2020 Rodolphe Cayzac was the mayor of the town, part of DVD. Since 2022 the mayor is Jérôme Pouget. He succeeded Laurence Cristol, who resigned on becoming member of parliament.

== Personalities linked to the city ==
François Spoerry (1912-1999) was a French architect and conceived the « village’s heart » of Saint-Clément-de-Rivière. He is famous in the whole world thanks to the realization of marinas such as Port Grimaud, on the Mediterranean coast of France.

== Coat of arms ==
The coat of arms of Saint-Clément-de-Rivière has, on the left side, a ram, which is the animal meant to have discovered the river's source with its hoof, according to the legend. On the right side we can see a pine cone to symbolize the vegetation of the town that is mostly covered with forests and scrubland. And in the middle, there is a drawing symbolizing the old bridge across the river which was originally used to bring water to Montpellier, this aqueduct was built following Pitot's plans.

This coat of arms was created by students of the primary school of Saint-Clément-de-Rivière in November 1983. This was an idea of the Municipal Commission, because the town didn't have any coat of arms before, to create a distinctive sign for the city. It now appears on official files, on municipal vehicles...

== See also ==
- Communes of the Hérault department
