= Assas, Hérault =

Assas
- Commune
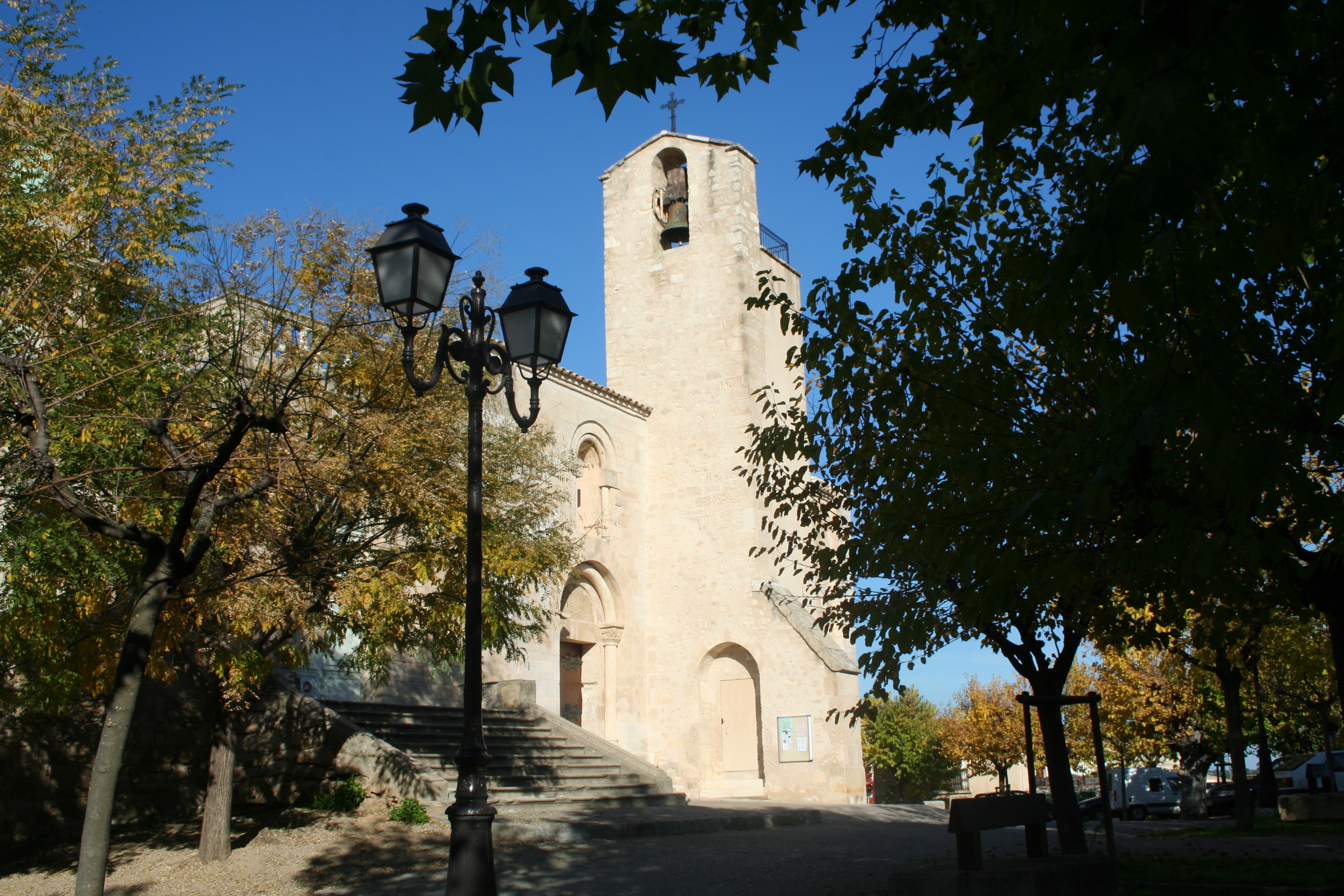
- Saint-Martial church

- Coat of arms
- Location of Assas
- Location within France Location within Occitanie
- Coordinates: 43°42′10″N 3°54′00″E
- Country: France
- Region: Occitania
- Department: Hérault
- Arrondissement: Lodève
- Canton: Saint-Gély-du-Fesc
- Intercommunality: CC Grand Pic Saint-Loup

Government
  - Mayor (2022–2026): Benoit Amphoux
- Area^{1}: 19.11 km^{2} (7.38 sq mi)
- Elevation: 85 m (279 ft)
- Highest elevation: 164 m (538 ft)
- Lowest elevation: 59 m (194 ft)
- Population (2023): 1,405
  - Density: 73.52/km^{2} (190.4/sq mi)
- Time zone: UTC+01:00 (CET)
  - Summer (DST): UTC+02:00 (CEST)
- INSEE/Postal code: 34014 /34820
- ^{1} French Land Register data, which excludes lakes, ponds, glaciers > 1 km^{2} (0.386 sq mi or 247 acres) and river estuaries.

Assas (French pronunciation: [asas]; Occitan: Assaç or Assats, [aˈsas]) is a town and commune in the Hérault department, region of Occitania, southern France.

== Geography ==
Located just north of Montpellier, Assas lies near Saint-Vincent de Barbeyrargues, Guzargues, Clapiers, Jacou, Castries and Teyran. The region near Assas is primarily scrubland, but it is watered by a number of streams and brooks and has a small wooded area that produces mushrooms in the fall.

The village of Assas is organized around the Château d'Assas, located on a hill overlooking the small but quaint old village.

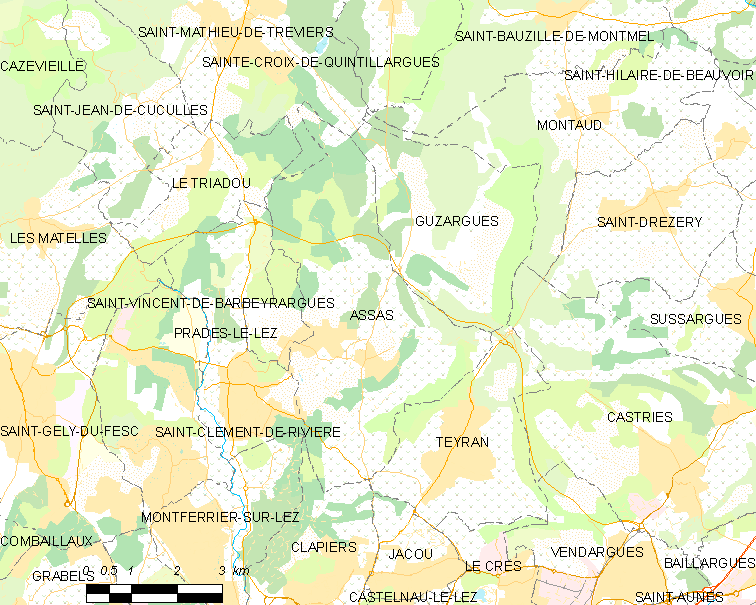
Map

== Population ==
The inhabitants are called Assadins in French.

Historical population
Year	Pop.	±% p.a.
1968	352	—
1975	506	+5.32%
1982	815	+7.05%
1990	992	+2.49%
1999	1,305	+3.09%
2007	1,509	+1.83%
2012	1,505	−0.05%
2017	1,520	+0.20%
2023	1,405	−1.30%
Source: INSEE

== Viticulture ==
The region containing Assas is a productive wine-making area, and has the appellation Grès de Montpellier. This is part of the AOC Coteaux du Languedoc designation.

== Sights ==
- Château d'Assas, an 18th-century folie montpellierraine, designed by the architect Jean-Antoine Giral (1700–1787), was built in 1759/1760 on the ruins of a feudal castle. It is a private residence, but can be toured either by appointment or on national holidays. A historic 18th century harpsichord is preserved in the Château, a favoured instrument of harpsichordist Scott Ross (1951–1989), who died in Assas. At the beginning of the 1920s, Sir Patrick Geddes (born Ballater, Scotland 2 October 1854, died Montpellier, France 17 April 1932), the Scottish botanist, bought the Château d'Assas to set up a centre for urban studies, as an extension of the Collège des Ecossais which he founded in Montpellier in 1890.
  The château was used as a set in the filming of La Belle Noiseuse, a film by Jacques Rivette (1991).
- A church of the 11th or 12th century, completely restored at the beginning of the 21st century.
- Remains of the 10th or 11th century fortifications.
- Old village.

== See also ==
- Communes of the Hérault department
