= Lez (river) =

River in southern France

Le Lez
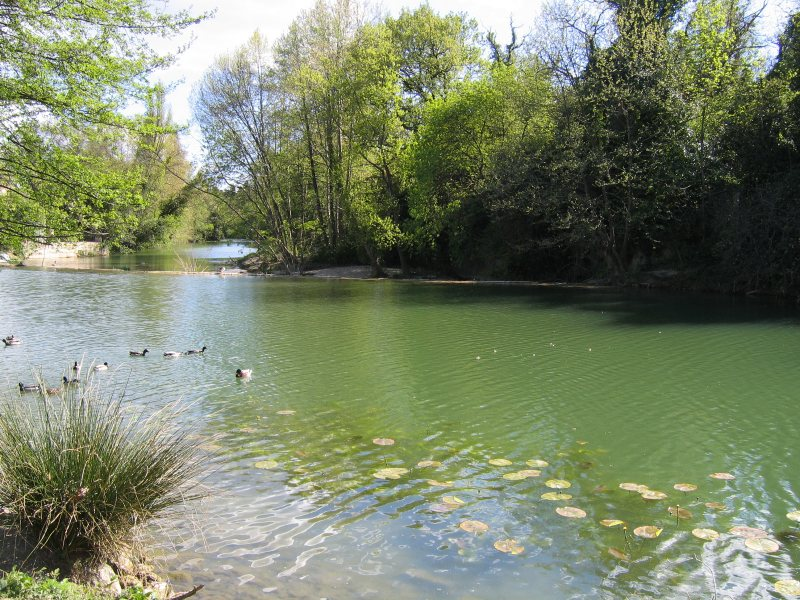

- Native name: Le Lez (French)

Location
- Country: France

Physical characteristics
- Source
  - location: Saint-Clément-de-Rivière
  - coordinates: 43°43′5″N 3°50′39″E
- Mouth
  - location: Mediterranean Sea (Palavas-les-Flots)
  - coordinates: 43°31′33″N 3°56′2″E
- Length: 29.6 kilometres (18.4 mi)

The Lez (French pronunciation: [lɛz]; Occitan: Les) is a 29.6-kilometre (18.4 mi) river in the Hérault department in southern France. It is the main river of the city of Montpellier. The river has its source in the forest 5 km north of Saint-Clément-de-Rivière and it flows into the Mediterranean Sea at Palavas-les-Flots after first passing between two large lagoons and intersecting with the Canal du Rhône à Sète. Its longest tributary is the Mosson. The small fish Cottus petiti is endemic to a short stretch of the Lez.

The communes along the Lez are (upstream to downstream):

- Saint-Clément-de-Rivière (source)
- Les Matelles
- Prades-le-Lez
- Montferrier-sur-Lez
- Clapiers
- Montpellier
- Castelnau-le-Lez
- Lattes
- Palavas-les-Flots (where it flows into the sea).

== See also ==
- Scène d'été, a 1859 painting by Frédéric Bazille, depicting bathers on the banks of the Lez
