= Bernard Pottier =

French linguist and academic (1924–2026)

- Born: 29 September 1924; Paris, France
- Died: 12 August 2026 (aged 101); Saint-Gély-du-Fesc, France
- Education: École pratique des hautes études University of Paris Faculty of Humanities
- Occupations: Linguist; Academic

Bernard Pottier (French: [bɛʁnˈaʁ pɔtjˈe]; 29 September 1924 – 12 August 2026) was a French linguist and academic.

== Life and career ==
Born in Paris on 29 September 1924, Pottier graduated from the Institut de phonétique de Paris in 1944, earning a diploma in Spanish studies. He graduated from the École pratique des hautes études in 1949 and earned a certificate of aptitude for secondary school teachers in the Spanish language. He earned a doctorate in letters from the University of Paris Faculty of Humanities. He served as a professor at several universities, teaching linguistics of Spanish and indigenous languages of the Americas.

Pottier was a member of numerous learned societies, such as the Société de Linguistique de Paris, the International Association of Applied Linguistics, and the Comité consultatif des Universités. In 1972, he founded the Amerindian ethnolinguistic group at the French National Centre for Scientific Research. He was also known for coining the term "orthonymy". He was the author of numerous publications, both in French and Spanish. In 2011, he was named a Commander of the Legion of Honour.

Pottier died in Saint-Gély-du-Fesc on 12 August 2026, at the age of 101.

== Publications ==
- La cassotte à manche tubulaire : histoire de l’objet et des noms qui le désignent (1957)
- Recherches sur l’analyse sémantique en linguistique et en traduction mécanique (1963)
- Grammaire de l'espagnol (1969)
- Linguistique générale : théorie et description (1974)
- Sémantique et logique (1976)
- Théorie et analyse en linguistique (1987)
- Sémantique générale (1992)
- La langue espagnole (1999)
- Représentations mentales et catégorisations linguistiques (2000)
- Linguistique générale : Théorie et description (2000)
- Grammaire explicative de l'espagnol (2005)
