= Saint-Bauzille =

Saint-Bauzille may refer to three communes in the Hérault department in southern France:

- Saint-Bauzille-de-la-Sylve
- Saint-Bauzille-de-Montmel
- Saint-Bauzille-de-Putois

== See also ==
- Saint-Bauzile (disambiguation)
