= Arrondissement of Lodève =

Coordinates: 43°43′53″N 3°18′53″E

Lodève
- Arrondissement
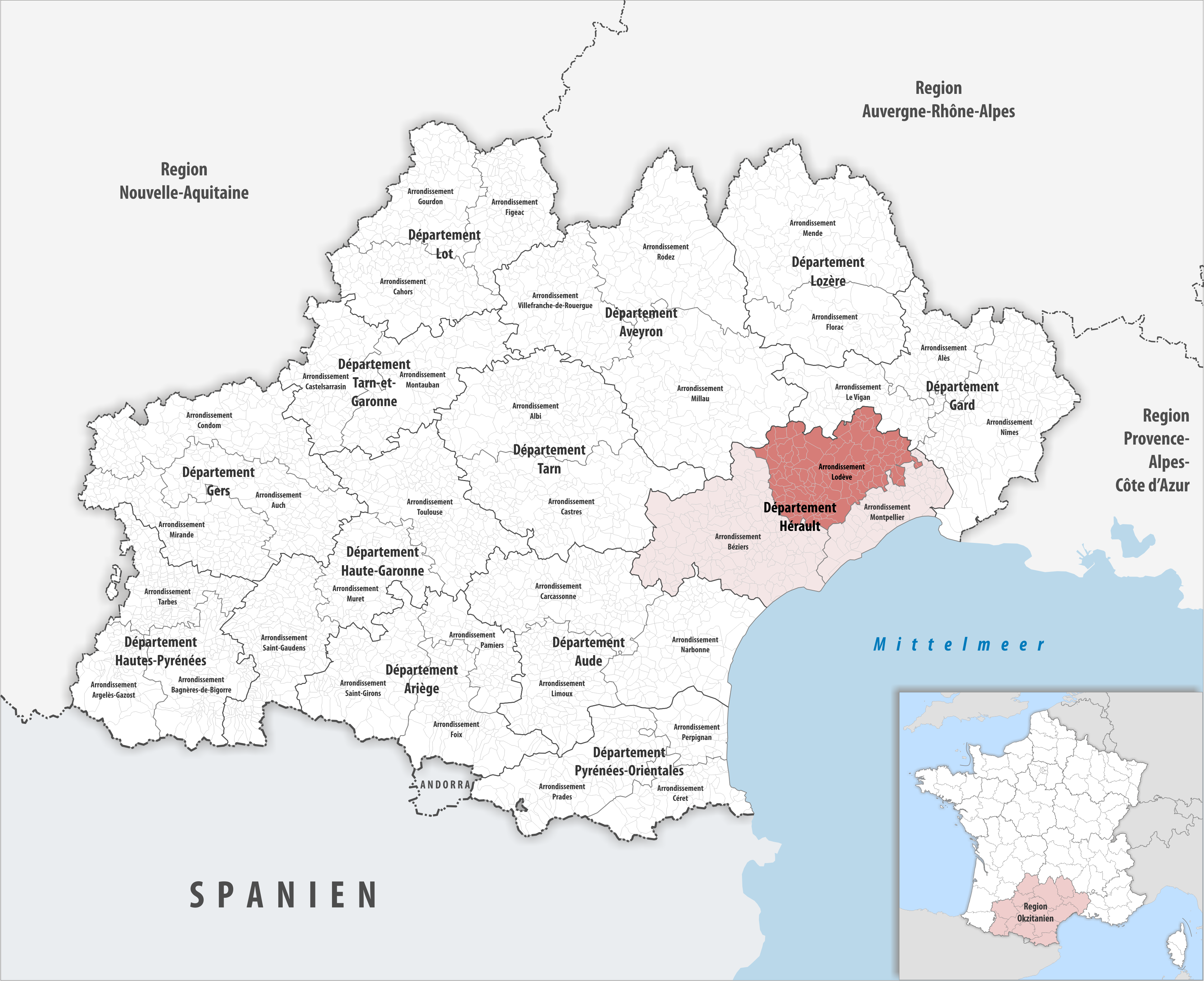
- Location within the region Occitanie
- Country: France
- Region: Occitania
- Department: Hérault
- No. of communes: {{{nbcomm}}}
- Area: 2,005.0 km^{2} (774.1 sq mi)
- Population (2023): 148,799
  - Density: 74.214/km^{2} (192.21/sq mi)
- INSEE code: 342

The arrondissement of Lodève is an arrondissement of France. It is part of the Hérault département. Its INSEE code is 342 and its capital city is Lodève. It has 122 communes. Its population is 146,845 (2021), and its area is 2,005.0 km^{2} (774.1 sq mi).

It is the northernmost of the arrondissements of the department. The main towns in the arrondissement, with more than 7,000 inhabitants in 2019, are Saint-Gély-du-Fesc (10,197 inhabitants), Clermont-l'Hérault (9,029 inhabitants) and Lodève (7,477 inhabitants).

== Geography ==
The arrondissement of Lodève is bordered to the north by the Gard department, to the east by the arrondissement of Montpellier, to the south by the arrondissement of Béziers, and to the west by the Aveyron department.

== Composition ==
The communes of the arrondissement of Lodève are (with their INSEE codes):

1. Agonès (34005)
2. Aniane (34010)
3. Arboras (34011)
4. Argelliers (34012)
5. Aspiran (34013)
6. Assas (34014)
7. Aumelas (34016)
8. Bélarga (34029)
9. La Boissière (34035)
10. Le Bosc (34036)
11. Brignac (34041)
12. Brissac (34042)
13. Buzignargues (34043)
14. Cabrières (34045)
15. Campagnan (34047)
16. Canet (34051)
17. Causse-de-la-Selle (34060)
18. Le Caylar (34064)
19. Cazevieille (34066)
20. Cazilhac (34067)
21. Celles (34072)
22. Ceyras (34076)
23. Claret (34078)
24. Clermont-l'Hérault (34079)
25. Combaillaux (34082)
26. Le Cros (34091)
27. Ferrières-les-Verreries (34099)
28. Fontanès (34102)
29. Fontès (34103)
30. Fozières (34106)
31. Ganges (34111)
32. Gignac (34114)
33. Gorniès (34115)
34. Guzargues (34118)
35. Jonquières (34122)
36. Lacoste (34124)
37. Lagamas (34125)
38. Laroque (34128)
39. Lauret (34131)
40. Lauroux (34132)
41. Lavalette (34133)
42. Liausson (34137)
43. Lieuran-Cabrières (34138)
44. Lodève (34142)
45. Mas-de-Londres (34152)
46. Les Matelles (34153)
47. Mérifons (34156)
48. Montarnaud (34163)
49. Montoulieu (34171)
50. Montpeyroux (34173)
51. Moulès-et-Baucels (34174)
52. Mourèze (34175)
53. Murles (34177)
54. Nébian (34180)
55. Notre-Dame-de-Londres (34185)
56. Octon (34186)
57. Olmet-et-Villecun (34188)
58. Paulhan (34194)
59. Pégairolles-de-Buèges (34195)
60. Pégairolles-de-l'Escalette (34196)
61. Péret (34197)
62. Plaissan (34204)
63. Les Plans (34205)
64. Popian (34208)
65. Le Pouget (34210)
66. Poujols (34212)
67. Pouzols (34215)
68. Le Puech (34220)
69. Puéchabon (34221)
70. Puilacher (34222)
71. Les Rives (34230)
72. Romiguières (34231)
73. Roqueredonde (34233)
74. Rouet (34236)
75. Saint-André-de-Buèges (34238)
76. Saint-André-de-Sangonis (34239)
77. Saint-Bauzille-de-la-Sylve (34241)
78. Saint-Bauzille-de-Montmel (34242)
79. Saint-Bauzille-de-Putois (34243)
80. Saint-Clément-de-Rivière (34247)
81. Sainte-Croix-de-Quintillargues (34248)
82. Saint-Étienne-de-Gourgas (34251)
83. Saint-Félix-de-Lodez (34254)
84. Saint-Félix-de-l'Héras (34253)
85. Saint-Gély-du-Fesc (34255)
86. Saint-Guilhem-le-Désert (34261)
87. Saint-Guiraud (34262)
88. Saint-Hilaire-de-Beauvoir (34263)
89. Saint-Jean-de-Buèges (34264)
90. Saint-Jean-de-Cornies (34265)
91. Saint-Jean-de-Cuculles (34266)
92. Saint-Jean-de-Fos (34267)
93. Saint-Jean-de-la-Blaquière (34268)
94. Saint-Martin-de-Londres (34274)
95. Saint-Mathieu-de-Tréviers (34276)
96. Saint-Maurice-Navacelles (34277)
97. Saint-Michel (34278)
98. Saint-Pargoire (34281)
99. Saint-Paul-et-Valmalle (34282)
100. Saint-Pierre-de-la-Fage (34283)
101. Saint-Privat (34286)
102. Saint-Saturnin-de-Lucian (34287)
103. Saint-Vincent-de-Barbeyrargues (34290)
104. Salasc (34292)
105. Sauteyrargues (34297)
106. Sorbs (34303)
107. Soubès (34304)
108. Soumont (34306)
109. Teyran (34309)
110. Tressan (34313)
111. Le Triadou (34314)
112. Usclas-d'Hérault (34315)
113. Usclas-du-Bosc (34316)
114. La Vacquerie-et-Saint-Martin-de-Castries (34317)
115. Vacquières (34318)
116. Vailhauquès (34320)
117. Valflaunès (34322)
118. Valmascle (34323)
119. Vendémian (34328)
120. Villeneuvette (34338)
121. Viols-en-Laval (34342)
122. Viols-le-Fort (34343)

== History ==
The arrondissement of Lodève was created in 1800, disbanded in 1926 and restored in 1942. In 2009 it absorbed the three cantons of Aniane, Ganges and Saint-Martin-de-Londres from the arrondissement of Montpellier. At the January 2017 reorganisation of the arrondissements of Hérault, it gained five communes from the arrondissement of Béziers and 26 communes from the arrondissement of Montpellier, and it lost seven communes to the arrondissement of Béziers.

As a result of the reorganisation of the cantons of France which came into effect in 2015, the borders of the cantons are no longer related to the borders of the arrondissements. The cantons of the arrondissement of Lodève were, as of January 2015:

1. Aniane
2. Le Caylar
3. Clermont-l'Hérault
4. Ganges
5. Gignac
6. Lodève
7. Lunas
8. Saint-Martin-de-Londres
