= Le Triadou =

- Commune
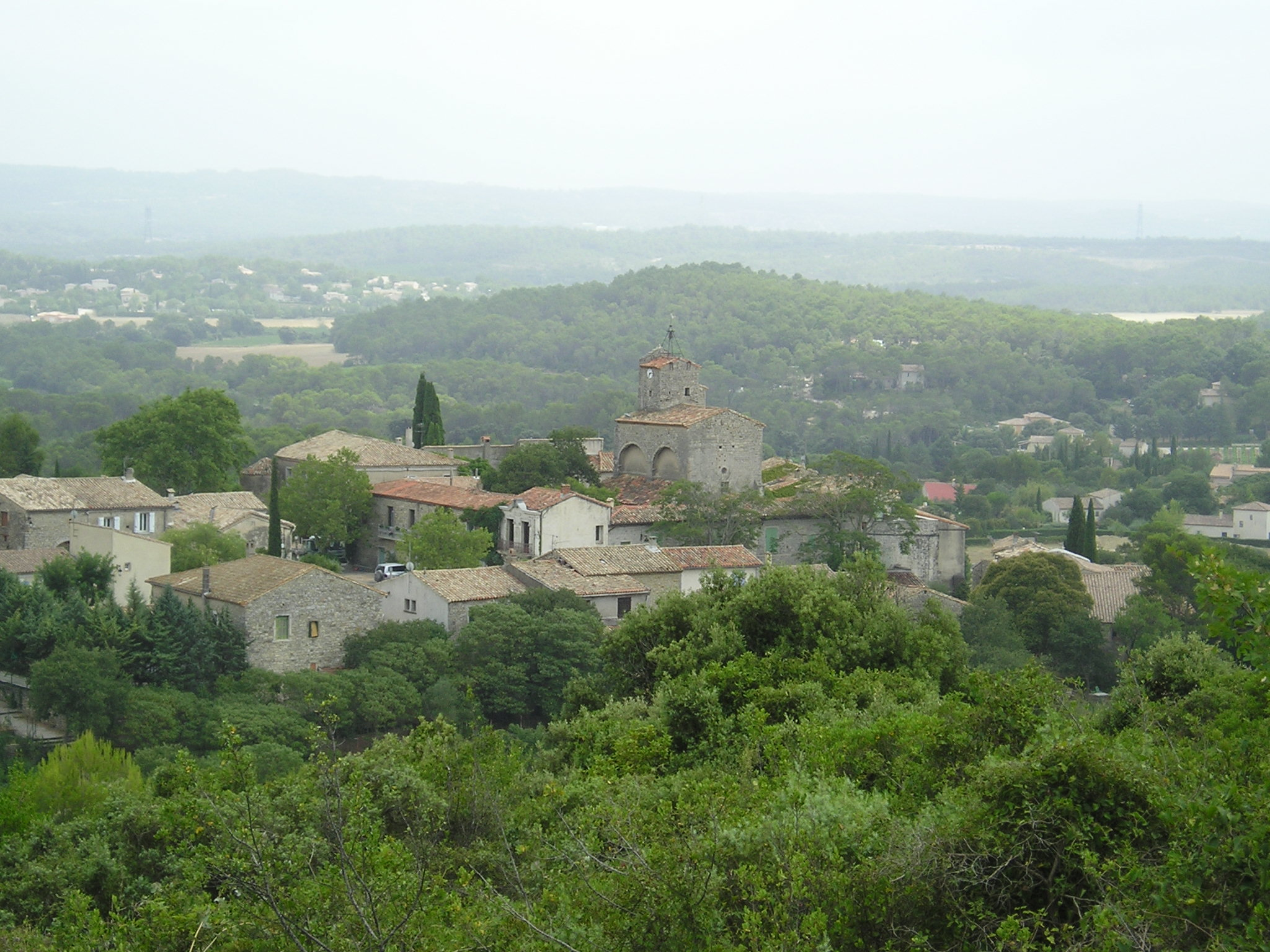
- A general view of Le Triadou

- Coat of arms
- Location of Le Triadou
- Location within France Location within Occitanie
- Coordinates: 43°44′27″N 3°51′09″E
- Country: France
- Region: Occitania
- Department: Hérault
- Arrondissement: Lodève
- Canton: Saint-Gély-du-Fesc
- Intercommunality: Grand Pic Saint-Loup

Government
  - Mayor (2020–2026): Pascal Vabre
- Area^{1}: 6.3 km^{2} (2.4 sq mi)
- Elevation: 100 m (330 ft)
- Highest elevation: 142 m (466 ft)
- Lowest elevation: 63 m (207 ft)
- Population (2023): 737
  - Density: 120/km^{2} (300/sq mi)
- Time zone: UTC+01:00 (CET)
  - Summer (DST): UTC+02:00 (CEST)
- INSEE/Postal code: 34314 /34270
- ^{1} French Land Register data, which excludes lakes, ponds, glaciers > 1 km^{2} (0.386 sq mi or 247 acres) and river estuaries.

Le Triadou (French pronunciation: [lə tʁijadu]; Occitan: Lo Triador) is a commune in the Hérault department in the Occitanie region in southern France.

== Population ==
Historical population
Year	Pop.	±% p.a.
1968	93	—
1975	125	+4.31%
1982	143	+1.94%
1990	262	+7.86%
1999	328	+2.53%
2007	365	+1.35%
2012	410	+2.35%
2017	462	+2.42%
2023	737	+8.09%
Source: INSEE

== See also ==
- Communes of the Hérault department
