= Saint-Bauzile =

Saint-Bauzile is the name of two communes in France:

- Saint-Bauzile, Ardèche
- Saint-Bauzile, Lozère

== See also ==
- Saint-Bauzille (disambiguation)
- Saint-Beauzile
