= Saint-Hilaire-de-Beauvoir =

- Commune
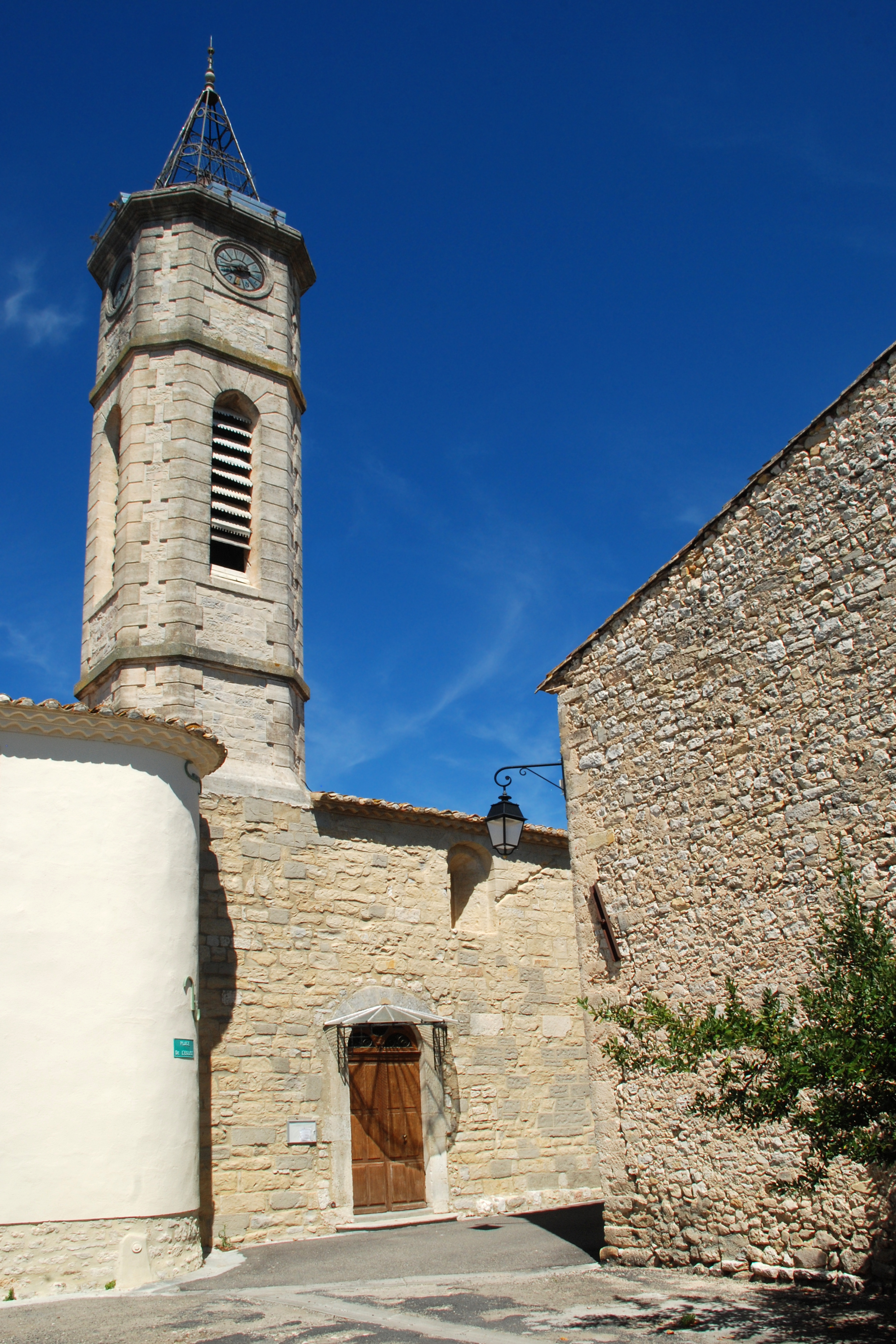
- The church of Saint-Hilaire-de-Beauvoir

- Coat of arms
- Location of Saint-Hilaire-de-Beauvoir
- Location within France Location within Occitanie
- Coordinates: 43°45′25″N 4°00′52″E
- Country: France
- Region: Occitania
- Department: Hérault
- Arrondissement: Lodève
- Canton: Saint-Gély-du-Fesc

Government
  - Mayor (2020–2026): Jean-Michel Pecoul
- Area^{1}: 4.69 km^{2} (1.81 sq mi)
- Elevation: 80 m (260 ft)
- Highest elevation: 86 m (282 ft)
- Lowest elevation: 39 m (128 ft)
- Population (2023): 461
  - Density: 98.3/km^{2} (255/sq mi)
- Time zone: UTC+01:00 (CET)
  - Summer (DST): UTC+02:00 (CEST)
- INSEE/Postal code: 34263 /34160
- ^{1} French Land Register data, which excludes lakes, ponds, glaciers > 1 km^{2} (0.386 sq mi or 247 acres) and river estuaries.

Saint-Hilaire-de-Beauvoir (French pronunciation: [sɛ̃.t‿ilɛʁ də bovwaʁ]; Occitan: Sant Alari de Bèlvéser) is a commune in the Hérault department in the Occitanie region in southern France.

== Population ==
Historical population
Year	Pop.	±% p.a.
1968	136	—
1975	125	−1.20%
1982	131	+0.67%
1990	167	+3.08%
1999	273	+5.61%
2007	345	+2.97%
2012	378	+1.84%
2017	420	+2.13%
2023	461	+1.56%
Source: INSEE

== See also ==
- Communes of the Hérault department
