= Canton of Saint-Gély-du-Fesc =

Coordinates: 43.69°N 3.81°E

Saint-Gély-du-Fesc
- Canton
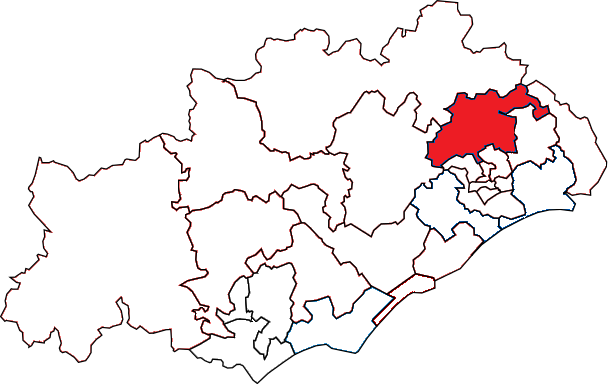
- Interactive map of Saint-Gély-du-Fesc
- Country: France
- Region: Occitania
- Department: Hérault
- No. of communes: {{{nbcomm}}}

Government
  - Representatives (2022–2028): Michèle Lernout; Jérôme Lopez
- Area: 241.36 km^{2} (93.19 sq mi)
- Population (2023): 46,894
  - Density: 194.29/km^{2} (503.21/sq mi)
- INSEE code: 34 23

The canton of Saint-Gély-du-Fesc is an administrative division of the Hérault department, southern France. It was created at the French canton reorganisation which came into effect in March 2015. Its seat is in Saint-Gély-du-Fesc.

== Composition ==
It consists of the following communes:

1. Assas
2. Buzignargues
3. Cazevieille
4. Combaillaux
5. Guzargues
6. Les Matelles
7. Murles
8. Prades-le-Lez
9. Saint-Bauzille-de-Montmel
10. Saint-Clément-de-Rivière
11. Sainte-Croix-de-Quintillargues
12. Saint-Gély-du-Fesc
13. Saint-Hilaire-de-Beauvoir
14. Saint-Jean-de-Cornies
15. Saint-Jean-de-Cuculles
16. Saint-Mathieu-de-Tréviers
17. Saint-Vincent-de-Barbeyrargues
18. Teyran
19. Le Triadou
20. Vailhauquès

== Councillors ==
Election	Councillors	Party	Occupation
2015	Laurence Cristol	DVD	Councillor of Saint-Clément-de-Rivière
2015	Guillaume Fabre	LR	Councillor of Saint-Gély-du-Fesc
2021	Laurence Cristol	DVD	Mayor of Saint-Clément-de-Rivière
2021	Jérôme Lopez	PS	Mayor of Saint-Mathieu-de-Tréviers

== Pictures of the canton ==
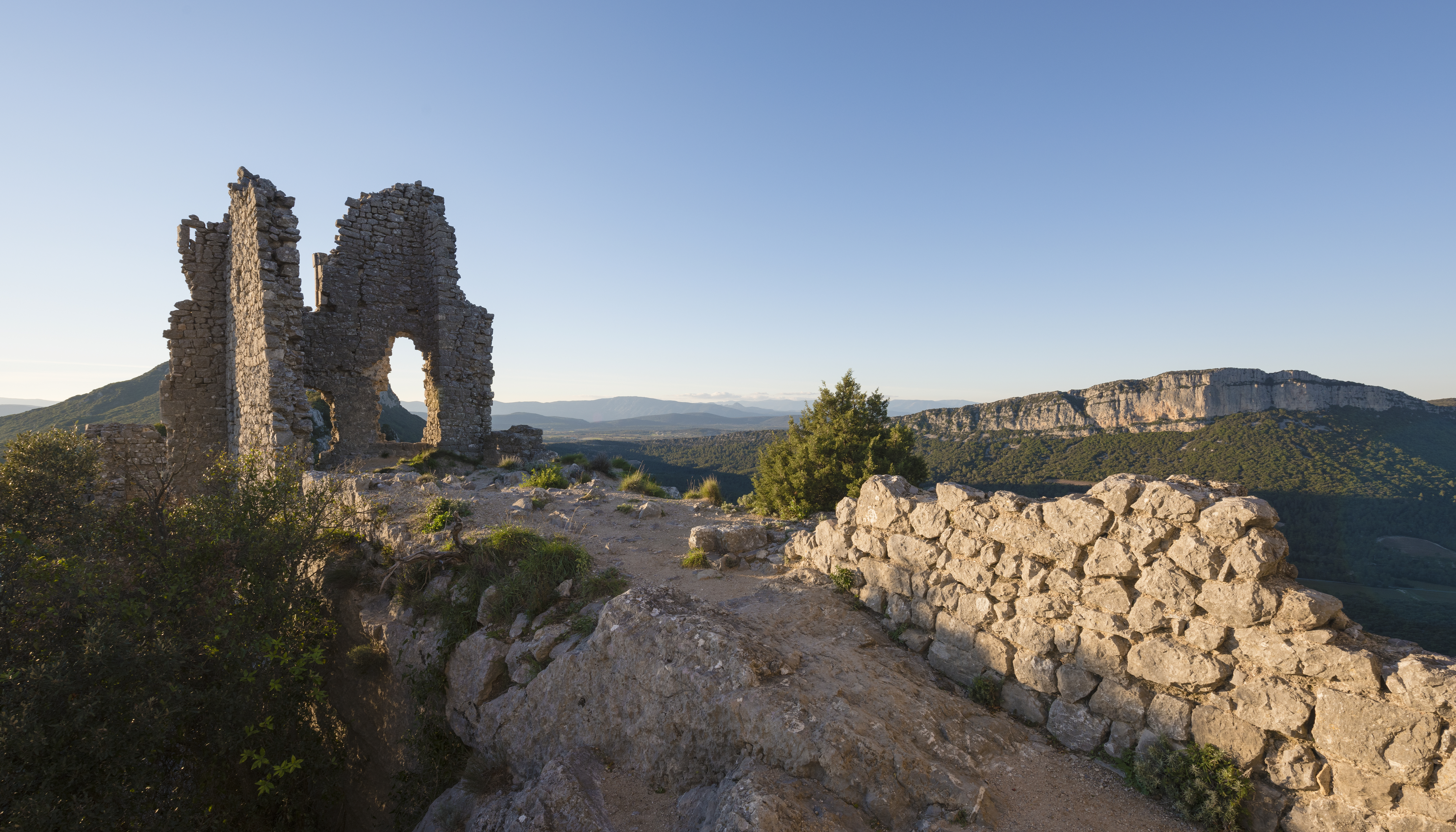
Ruins of the Castle of Montferrand in Saint-Mathieu-de-Tréviers

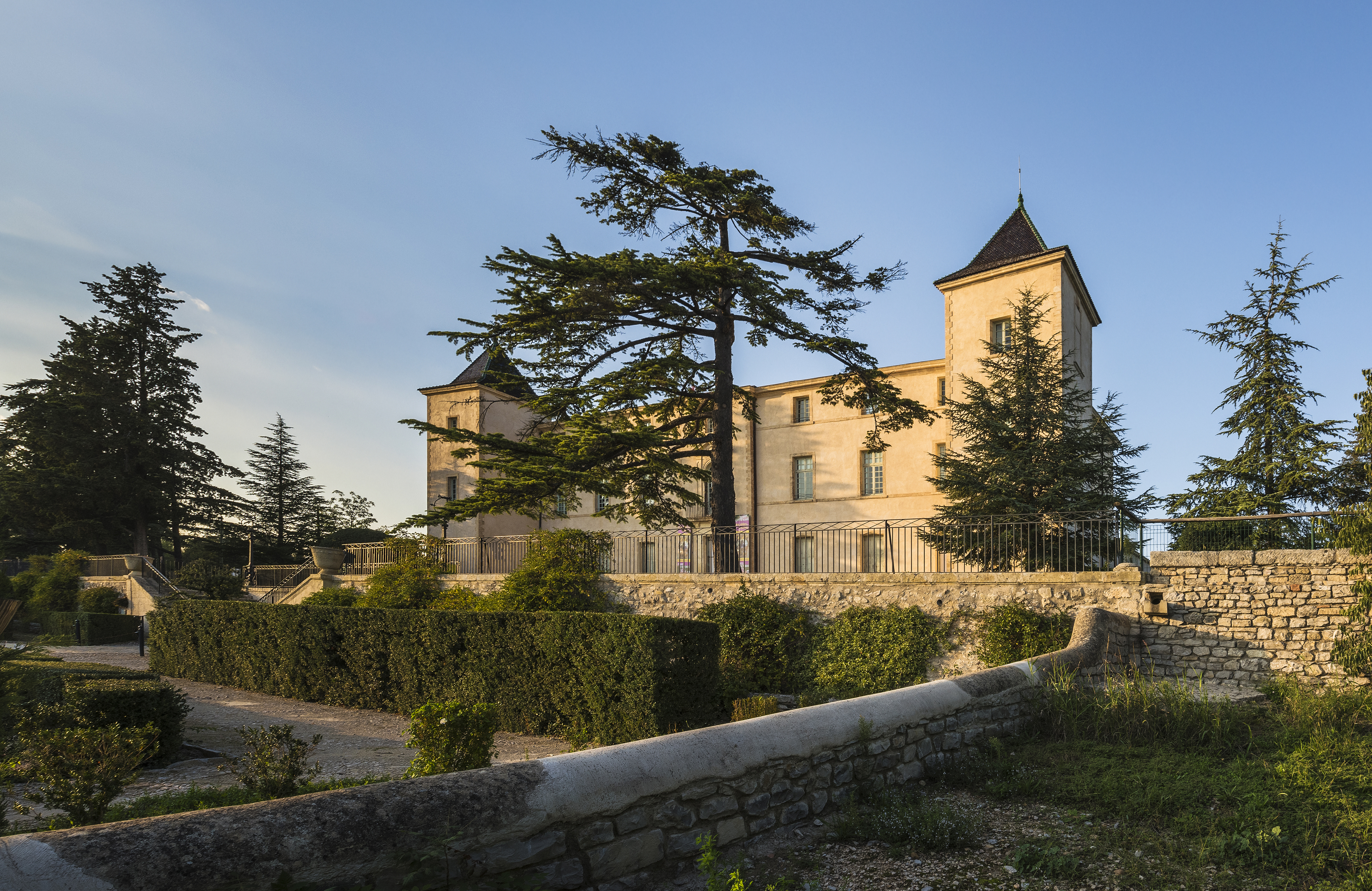
Castle of Restinclières in Prades-le-Lez

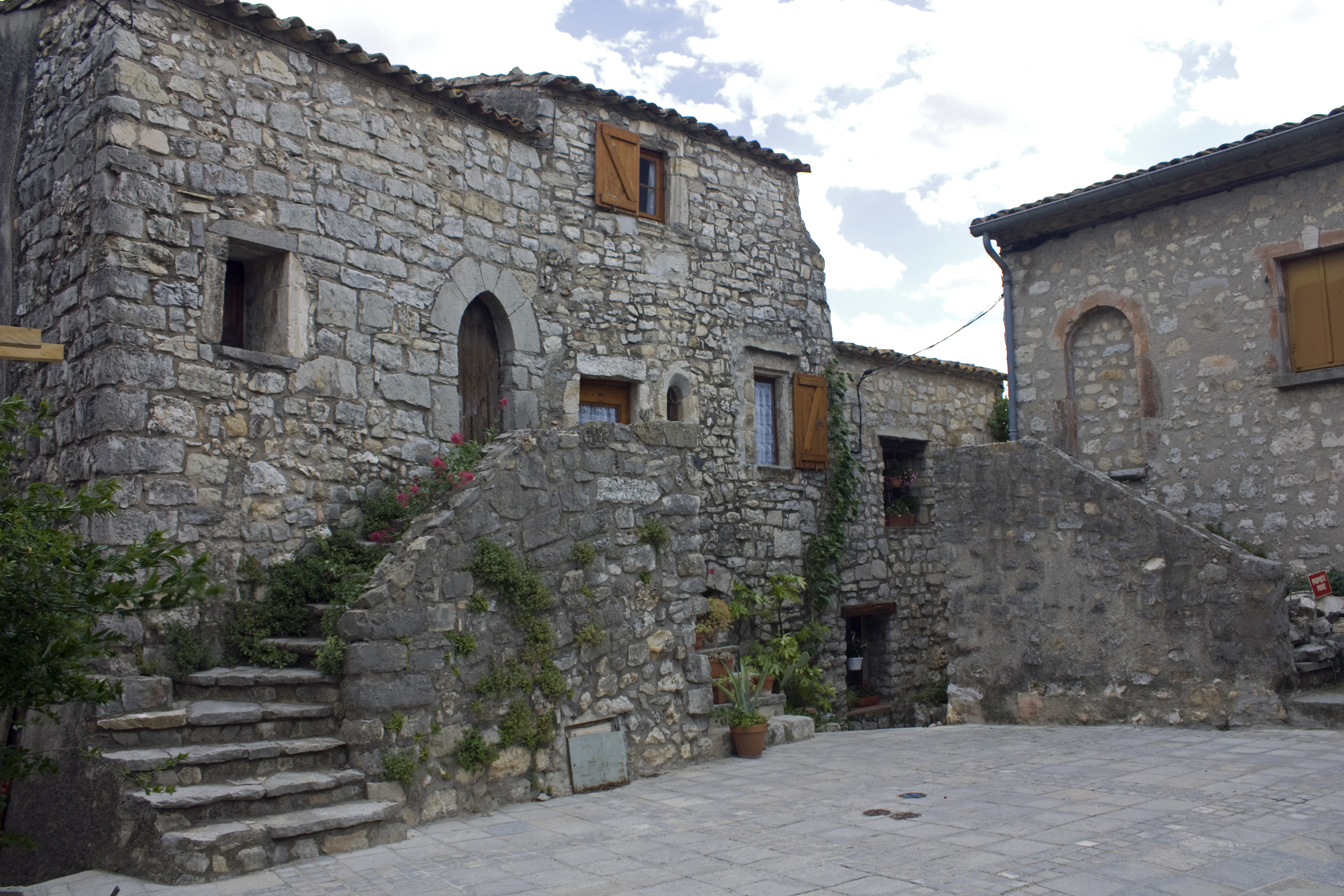
Square in Les Matelles
