= Sainte-Croix-de-Quintillargues =

- Commune
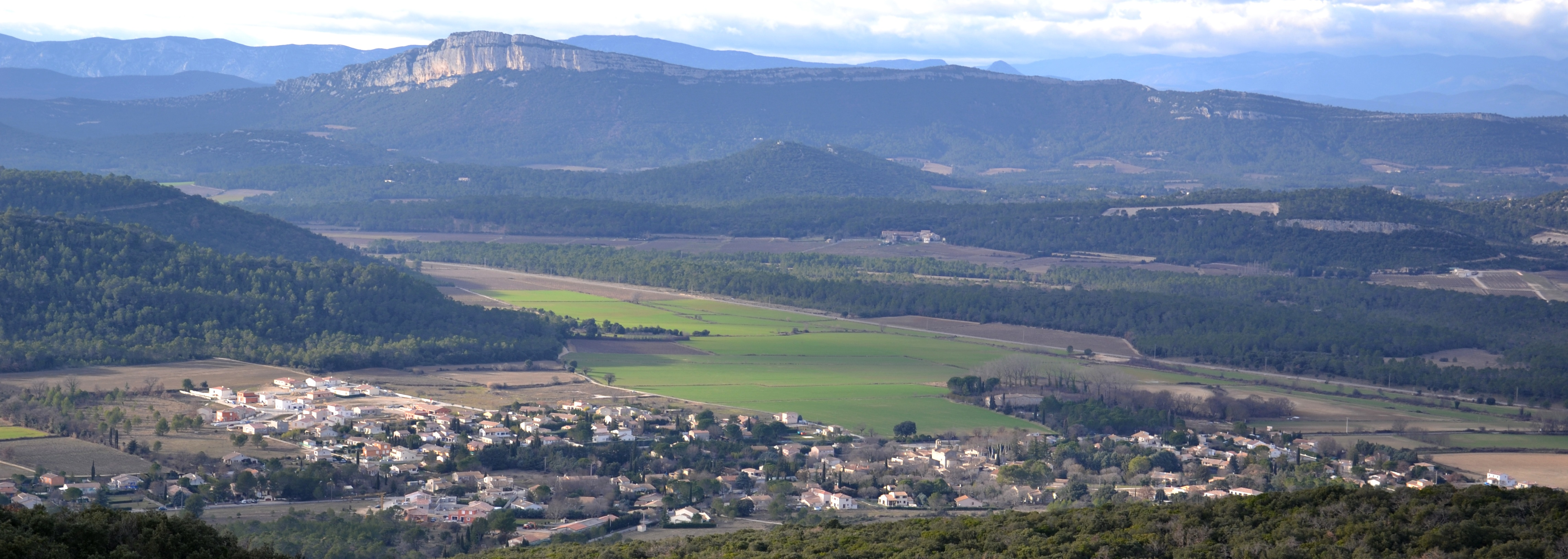
- A general view of Sainte-Croix-de-Quintillargues

- Coat of arms
- Location of Sainte-Croix-de-Quintillargues
- Location within France Location within Occitanie
- Coordinates: 43°46′24″N 3°54′35″E
- Country: France
- Region: Occitania
- Department: Hérault
- Arrondissement: Lodève
- Canton: Saint-Gély-du-Fesc

Government
  - Mayor (2020–2026): Antoine Martinez
- Area^{1}: 6.62 km^{2} (2.56 sq mi)
- Elevation: 65 m (213 ft)
- Highest elevation: 321 m (1,053 ft)
- Lowest elevation: 104 m (341 ft)
- Population (2023): 984
  - Density: 149/km^{2} (385/sq mi)
- Time zone: UTC+01:00 (CET)
  - Summer (DST): UTC+02:00 (CEST)
- INSEE/Postal code: 34248 /34270
- ^{1} French Land Register data, which excludes lakes, ponds, glaciers > 1 km^{2} (0.386 sq mi or 247 acres) and river estuaries.

Sainte-Croix-de-Quintillargues (French pronunciation: [sɛ̃t kʁwa də kɛ̃tijaʁɡ]; Occitan: Santa Crotz de Quintilhargues) is a commune in the Hérault department in the Occitanie region in southern France.

== Population ==
Historical population
Year	Pop.	±% p.a.
1968	107	—
1975	129	+2.71%
1982	218	+7.78%
1990	382	+7.26%
1999	531	+3.73%
2007	574	+0.98%
2012	674	+3.26%
2017	902	+6.00%
2023	984	+1.46%
Source: INSEE

== See also ==
- Communes of the Hérault department
