= Murles =

- Commune
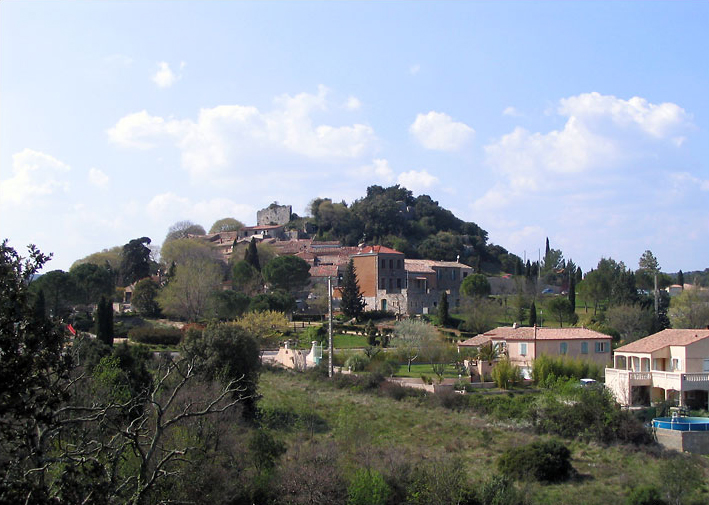
- A general view of Murles

- Coat of arms
- Location of Murles
- Location within France Location within Occitanie
- Coordinates: 43°41′24″N 3°44′48″E
- Country: France
- Region: Occitania
- Department: Hérault
- Arrondissement: Lodève
- Canton: Saint-Gély-du-Fesc

Government
  - Mayor (2020–2026): Eric Riguet
- Area^{1}: 24.06 km^{2} (9.29 sq mi)
- Elevation: 216 m (709 ft)
- Highest elevation: 298 m (978 ft)
- Lowest elevation: 80 m (260 ft)
- Population (2023): 353
  - Density: 14.7/km^{2} (38.0/sq mi)
- Time zone: UTC+01:00 (CET)
  - Summer (DST): UTC+02:00 (CEST)
- INSEE/Postal code: 34177 /34980
- ^{1} French Land Register data, which excludes lakes, ponds, glaciers > 1 km^{2} (0.386 sq mi or 247 acres) and river estuaries.

Murles (French pronunciation: [myʁl]; Occitan: Murlas) is a commune in the Hérault department in the Occitanie region in southern France.

== Population ==
Historical population
Year	Pop.	±% p.a.
1968	47	—
1975	67	+5.20%
1982	126	+9.44%
1990	200	+5.95%
1999	233	+1.71%
2007	276	+2.14%
2012	291	+1.06%
2017	308	+1.14%
2023	353	+2.30%
Source: INSEE

== See also ==
- Communes of the Hérault department
