= Saint-Jean-de-Cornies =

- Commune
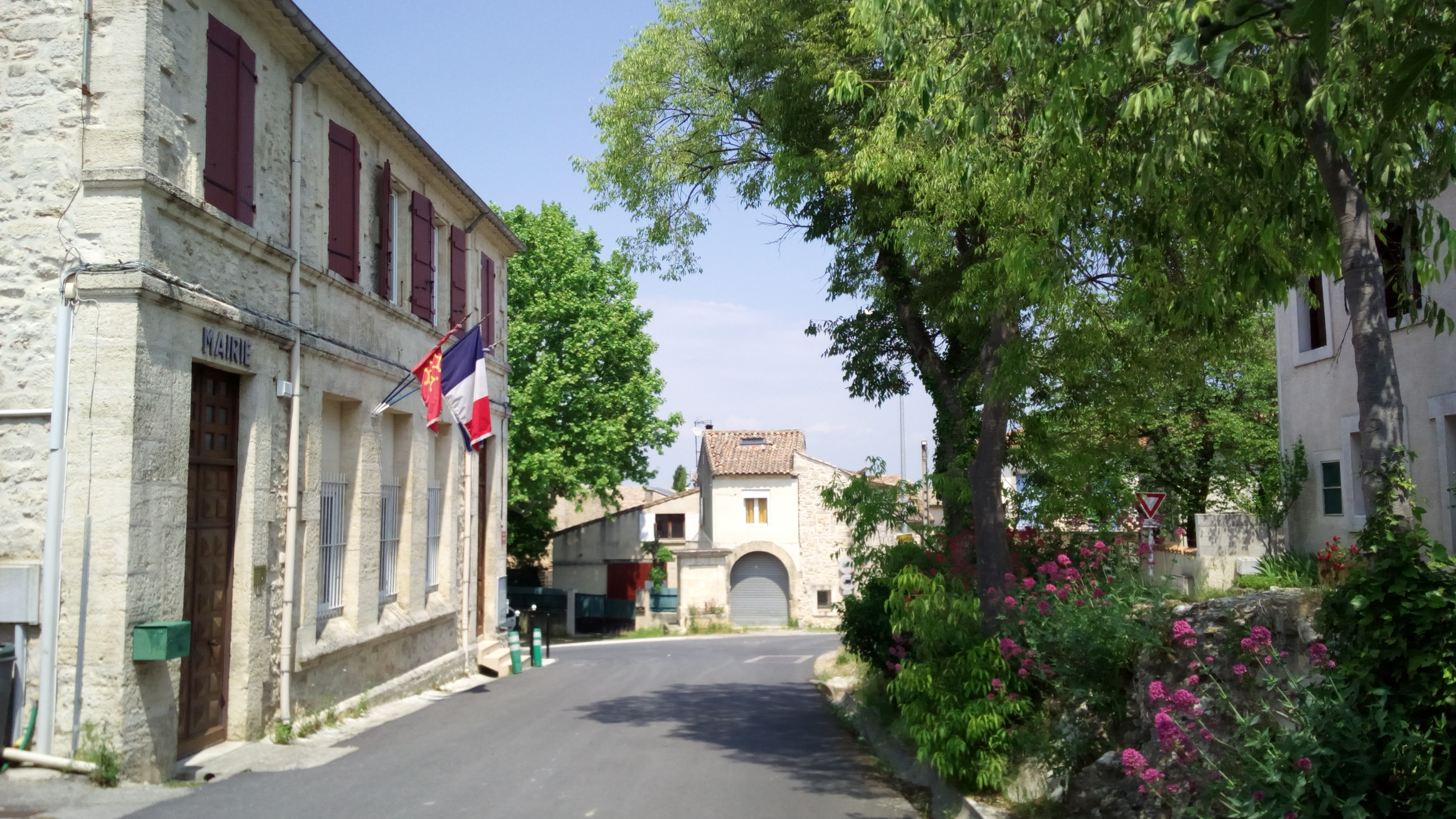

- Coat of arms
- Location of Saint-Jean-de-Cornies
- Location within France Location within Occitanie
- Coordinates: 43°44′42″N 4°00′06″E
- Country: France
- Region: Occitania
- Department: Hérault
- Arrondissement: Lodève
- Canton: Saint-Gély-du-Fesc

Government
  - Mayor (2020–2026): Jean-Claude Armand
- Area^{1}: 3.11 km^{2} (1.20 sq mi)
- Elevation: 110 m (360 ft)
- Highest elevation: 106 m (348 ft)
- Lowest elevation: 50 m (160 ft)
- Population (2023): 858
  - Density: 276/km^{2} (715/sq mi)
- Time zone: UTC+01:00 (CET)
  - Summer (DST): UTC+02:00 (CEST)
- INSEE/Postal code: 34265 /34160
- ^{1} French Land Register data, which excludes lakes, ponds, glaciers > 1 km^{2} (0.386 sq mi or 247 acres) and river estuaries.

Saint-Jean-de-Cornies (French pronunciation: [sɛ̃ ʒɑ̃ də kɔʁni]; Occitan: Sant Joan de Cornièrs) is a commune in the Hérault department in the Occitanie region in southern France.

== Population ==
Historical population
Year	Pop.	±% p.a.
1968	55	—
1975	54	−0.26%
1982	159	+16.68%
1990	344	+10.13%
1999	478	+3.72%
2007	663	+4.17%
2012	681	+0.54%
2017	721	+1.15%
2023	858	+2.94%
Source: INSEE

== See also ==
- Communes of the Hérault department
