= Communes of the Hérault department =

Hérault is located in France

Map of the communes of Hérault

The following is a list of the 341 communes of the Hérault department of France.

The communes cooperate in the following intercommunalities (as of 2025):

- Montpellier Méditerranée Métropole
- Communauté d'agglomération Béziers Méditerranée
- Communauté d'agglomération Hérault Méditerranée
- CA Lunel Agglo
- Communauté d'agglomération du Pays de l'Or
- CA Sète Agglopôle Méditerranée
- Communauté de communes Les Avant-Monts
- Communauté de communes des Cévennes Gangeoises et Suménoises (partly)
- Communauté de communes du Clermontais
- Communauté de communes la Domitienne
- Communauté de communes Grand Orb
- Communauté de communes du Grand Pic Saint-Loup
- Communauté de communes Lodévois et Larzac
- Communauté de communes du Minervois au Caroux
- Communauté de communes du Haut-Languedoc (partly)
- Communauté de communes Sud-Hérault
- Communauté de communes Vallée de l'Hérault

== History ==
On 1 January 2025, the number of communes in the department decreased from 342 to 341 following the creation of the new commune of Lunas-les-Châteaux by merging Lunas and Dio-et-Valquières.

== List of communes ==
The following table gives the list of communes as of 1 January 2025, specifying their INSEE code, their main postal code, their district, their canton, their inter-commune, their surface area, their population and their density, according to the INSEE figures from the 2022 census.

INSEE	Postal	Commune
34001	34290	Abeilhan
34002	34230	Adissan
34003	34300	Agde
34004	34210	Agel
34005	34190	Agonès
34006	34210	Aigne
34007	34210	Aigues-Vives
34008	34600	Les Aires
34009	34290	Alignan-du-Vent
34010	34150	Aniane
34011	34150	Arboras
34012	34380	Argelliers
34013	34800	Aspiran
34014	34820	Assas
34015	34360	Assignan
34016	34230	Aumelas
34017	34530	Aumes
34018	34480	Autignac
34019	34260	Avène
34020	34210	Azillanet
34021	34360	Babeau-Bouldoux
34022	34670	Baillargues
34023	34540	Balaruc-les-Bains
34024	34540	Balaruc-le-Vieux
34025	34290	Bassan
34026	34210	Beaufort
34027	34160	Beaulieu
34028	34600	Bédarieux
34029	34230	Bélarga
34030	34360	Berlou
34031	34550	Bessan
34032	34500	Béziers
34033	34160	Boisseron
34034	34220	Boisset
34035	34150	La Boissière
34036	34700	Le Bosc
34037	34760	Boujan-sur-Libron
34038	34260	Le Bousquet-d'Orb
34039	34140	Bouzigues
34040	34650	Brenas
34041	34800	Brignac
34042	34190	Brissac
34043	34160	Buzignargues
34044	34480	Cabrerolles
34045	34800	Cabrières
34046	34330	Cambon-et-Salvergues
34047	34230	Campagnan
34048	34160	Campagne
34049	34260	Camplong
34050	34130	Candillargues
34051	34800	Canet
34052	34310	Capestang
34053	34600	Carlencas-et-Levas
34054	34210	Cassagnoles
34055	34610	Castanet-le-Haut
34056	34120	Castelnau-de-Guers
34057	34170	Castelnau-le-Lez
34058	34160	Castries
34059	34210	La Caunette
34060	34380	Causse-de-la-Selle
34061	34490	Causses-et-Veyran
34062	34600	Caussiniojouls
34063	34720	Caux
34064	34520	Le Caylar
34065	34460	Cazedarnes
34066	34270	Cazevieille
34067	34190	Cazilhac
34068	34120	Cazouls-d'Hérault
34069	34370	Cazouls-lès-Béziers
34070	34360	Cébazan
34071	34260	Ceilhes-et-Rocozels
34072	34800	Celles
34073	34420	Cers
34074	34460	Cessenon-sur-Orb
34075	34210	Cesseras
34076	34800	Ceyras
34077	34830	Clapiers
34078	34270	Claret
34079	34800	Clermont-l'Hérault
34080	34390	Colombières-sur-Orb
34081	34440	Colombiers
34082	34980	Combaillaux
34083	34240	Combes
34084	34490	Corneilhan
34085	34290	Coulobres
34086	34220	Courniou
34087	34660	Cournonsec
34088	34660	Cournonterral
34089	34370	Creissan
34090	34920	Le Crès
34091	34520	Le Cros
34092	34310	Cruzy
34246	34400	Entre-Vignes
34094	34290	Espondeilhan
34095	34690	Fabrègues
34096	34600	Faugères
34097	34210	Félines-Minervois
34098	34210	Ferrals-les-Montagnes
34099	34190	Ferrières-les-Verreries
34100	34360	Ferrières-Poussarou
34101	34510	Florensac
34102	34270	Fontanès
34103	34320	Fontès
34104	34320	Fos
34105	34480	Fouzilhon
34106	34700	Fozières
34107	34330	Fraisse-sur-Agout
34108	34110	Frontignan
34109	34320	Gabian
34110	34160	Galargues
34111	34190	Ganges
34112	34160	Garrigues
34113	34770	Gigean
34114	34150	Gignac
34115	34190	Gorniès
34116	34790	Grabels
34117	34260	Graissessac
34344	34280	La Grande-Motte
34118	34820	Guzargues
34119	34600	Hérépian
34120	34830	Jacou
34121	34650	Joncels
34122	34725	Jonquières
34123	34990	Juvignac
34124	34800	Lacoste
34125	34150	Lagamas
34126	34240	Lamalou-les-Bains
34127	34130	Lansargues
34128	34190	Laroque
34129	34970	Lattes
34130	34480	Laurens
34131	34270	Lauret
34132	34700	Lauroux
34133	34700	Lavalette
34134	34880	Lavérune
34135	34710	Lespignan
34136	34120	Lézignan-la-Cèbe
34137	34800	Liausson
34138	34800	Lieuran-Cabrières
34139	34290	Lieuran-lès-Béziers
34140	34490	Lignan-sur-Orb
34141	34210	La Livinière
34142	34700	Lodève
34143	34140	Loupian
34144	34650	Lunas-les-Châteaux
34145	34400	Lunel
34146	34400	Lunel-Viel
34147	34480	Magalas
34148	34370	Maraussan
34149	34320	Margon
34150	34340	Marseillan
34151	34590	Marsillargues
34152	34380	Mas-de-Londres
34153	34270	Les Matelles
34154	34130	Mauguio
34155	34370	Maureilhan
34156	34800	Mérifons
34157	34140	Mèze
34158	34210	Minerve
34159	34110	Mireval
34160	34390	Mons
34161	34310	Montady
34162	34530	Montagnac
34163	34570	Montarnaud
34164	34160	Montaud
34165	34560	Montbazin
34166	34290	Montblanc
34167	34310	Montels
34168	34320	Montesquieu
34169	34980	Montferrier-sur-Lez
34170	34310	Montouliers
34171	34190	Montoulieu

INSEE	Postal	Commune
34172	34000	Montpellier
34173	34150	Montpeyroux
34174	34190	Moulès-et-Baucels
34175	34800	Mourèze
34176	34130	Mudaison
34177	34980	Murles
34178	34490	Murviel-lès-Béziers
34179	34570	Murviel-lès-Montpellier
34180	34800	Nébian
34181	34320	Neffiès
34182	34120	Nézignan-l'Évêque
34183	34440	Nissan-lez-Enserune
34184	34320	Nizas
34185	34380	Notre-Dame-de-Londres
34186	34800	Octon
34187	34390	Olargues
34188	34700	Olmet-et-Villecun
34189	34210	Olonzac
34190	34210	Oupia
34191	34490	Pailhès
34192	34250	Palavas-les-Flots
34193	34360	Pardailhan
34194	34230	Paulhan
34195	34380	Pégairolles-de-Buèges
34196	34700	Pégairolles-de-l'Escalette
34197	34800	Péret
34198	34470	Pérols
34199	34120	Pézenas
34200	34600	Pézènes-les-Mines
34201	34360	Pierrerue
34202	34570	Pignan
34203	34850	Pinet
34204	34230	Plaissan
34205	34700	Les Plans
34206	34310	Poilhes
34207	34810	Pomérols
34208	34230	Popian
34209	34420	Portiragnes
34210	34230	Le Pouget
34212	34700	Poujols
34211	34600	Le Poujol-sur-Orb
34213	34560	Poussan
34214	34480	Pouzolles
34215	34230	Pouzols
34216	34600	Le Pradal
34217	34730	Prades-le-Lez
34218	34360	Prades-sur-Vernazobre
34219	34390	Prémian
34220	34700	Le Puech
34221	34150	Puéchabon
34222	34230	Puilacher
34223	34480	Puimisson
34224	34480	Puissalicon
34225	34620	Puisserguier
34226	34310	Quarante
34227	34160	Restinclières
34228	34220	Rieussec
34229	34220	Riols
34230	34520	Les Rives
34231	34650	Romiguières
34232	34460	Roquebrun
34233	34650	Roqueredonde
34234	34320	Roquessels
34235	34610	Rosis
34236	34380	Rouet
34237	34320	Roujan
34238	34190	Saint-André-de-Buèges
34239	34725	Saint-André-de-Sangonis
34240	34130	Saint-Aunès
34241	34230	Saint-Bauzille-de-la-Sylve
34242	34160	Saint-Bauzille-de-Montmel
34243	34190	Saint-Bauzille-de-Putois
34244	34670	Saint-Brès
34245	34360	Saint-Chinian
34247	34980	Saint-Clément-de-Rivière
34249	34160	Saint-Drézéry
34248	34270	Sainte-Croix-de-Quintillargues
34250	34390	Saint-Étienne-d'Albagnan
34251	34700	Saint-Étienne-de-Gourgas
34252	34260	Saint-Étienne-Estréchoux
34253	34520	Saint-Félix-de-l'Héras
34254	34725	Saint-Félix-de-Lodez
34255	34980	Saint-Gély-du-Fesc
34258	34480	Saint-Geniès-de-Fontedit
34256	34160	Saint-Geniès-des-Mourgues
34257	34610	Saint-Geniès-de-Varensal
34259	34680	Saint-Georges-d'Orques
34260	34610	Saint-Gervais-sur-Mare
34261	34150	Saint-Guilhem-le-Désert
34262	34725	Saint-Guiraud
34263	34160	Saint-Hilaire-de-Beauvoir
34264	34380	Saint-Jean-de-Buèges
34265	34160	Saint-Jean-de-Cornies
34266	34270	Saint-Jean-de-Cuculles
34267	34150	Saint-Jean-de-Fos
34268	34700	Saint-Jean-de-la-Blaquière
34269	34360	Saint-Jean-de-Minervois
34270	34430	Saint-Jean-de-Védas
34271	34390	Saint-Julien
34272	34400	Saint-Just
34273	34390	Saint-Martin-de-l'Arçon
34274	34380	Saint-Martin-de-Londres
34276	34270	Saint-Mathieu-de-Tréviers
34277	34520	Saint-Maurice-Navacelles
34278	34520	Saint-Michel
34279	34490	Saint-Nazaire-de-Ladarez
34280	34400	Saint-Nazaire-de-Pézan
34281	34230	Saint-Pargoire
34282	34570	Saint-Paul-et-Valmalle
34283	34520	Saint-Pierre-de-la-Fage
34285	34230	Saint-Pons-de-Mauchiens
34284	34220	Saint-Pons-de-Thomières
34286	34700	Saint-Privat
34287	34725	Saint-Saturnin-de-Lucian
34288	34400	Saint-Sériès
34289	34630	Saint-Thibéry
34290	34730	Saint-Vincent-de-Barbeyrargues
34291	34390	Saint-Vincent-d'Olargues
34292	34800	Salasc
34293	34330	La Salvetat-sur-Agout
34294	34400	Saturargues
34295	34570	Saussan
34296	34160	Saussines
34297	34270	Sauteyrargues
34298	34410	Sauvian
34299	34410	Sérignan
34300	34290	Servian
34301	34200	Sète
34302	34210	Siran
34303	34520	Sorbs
34304	34700	Soubès
34305	34330	Le Soulié
34306	34700	Soumont
34307	34160	Sussargues
34308	34600	Taussac-la-Billière
34309	34820	Teyran
34310	34490	Thézan-lès-Béziers
34311	34120	Tourbes
34312	34260	La Tour-sur-Orb
34313	34230	Tressan
34314	34270	Le Triadou
34315	34230	Usclas-d'Hérault
34316	34700	Usclas-du-Bosc
34317	34520	La Vacquerie-et-Saint-Martin-de-Castries
34318	34270	Vacquières
34319	34320	Vailhan
34320	34570	Vailhauquès
34321	34130	Valergues
34322	34270	Valflaunès
34323	34800	Valmascle
34324	34350	Valras-Plage
34325	34290	Valros
34326	34220	Vélieux
34327	34740	Vendargues
34328	34230	Vendémian
34329	34350	Vendres
34331	34220	Verreries-de-Moussans
34332	34450	Vias
34333	34110	Vic-la-Gardiole
34334	34390	Vieussan
34335	34600	Villemagne-l'Argentière
34336	34420	Villeneuve-lès-Béziers
34337	34750	Villeneuve-lès-Maguelone
34338	34800	Villeneuvette
34339	34360	Villespassans
34340	34400	Villetelle
34341	34560	Villeveyrac
34342	34380	Viols-en-Laval
34343	34380	Viols-le-Fort
