= Buzignargues =

- Commune
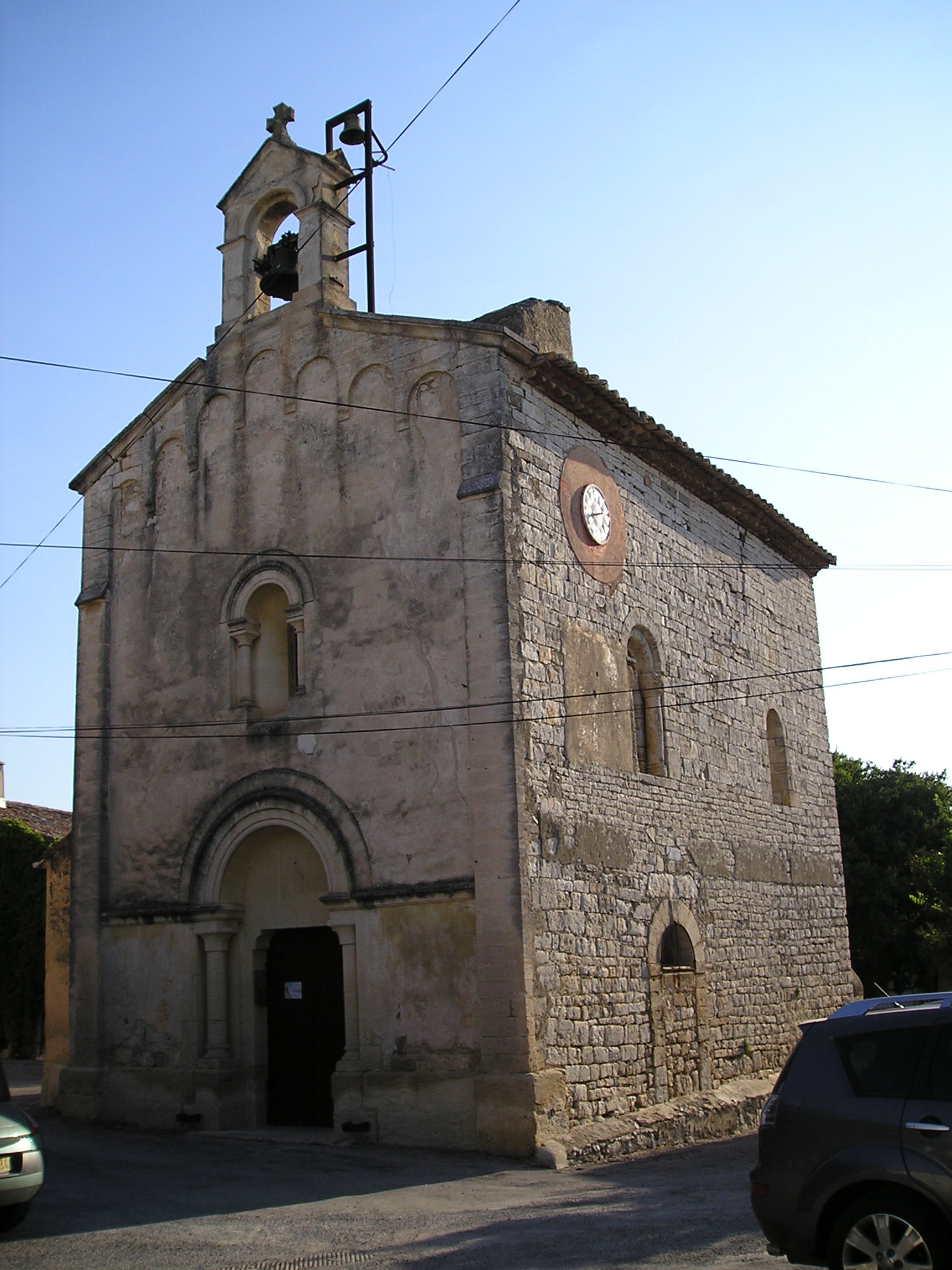
- Saint-Nazaire-et-Saint-Celse church

- Coat of arms
- Location of Buzignargues
- Location within France Location within Occitanie
- Coordinates: 43°46′16″N 4°00′20″E
- Country: France
- Region: Occitania
- Department: Hérault
- Arrondissement: Lodève
- Canton: Saint-Gély-du-Fesc

Government
  - Mayor (2020–2026): Agnès Rouviere-Esposito
- Area^{1}: 4.61 km^{2} (1.78 sq mi)
- Elevation: 70 m (230 ft)
- Highest elevation: 133 m (436 ft)
- Lowest elevation: 40 m (130 ft)
- Population (2023): 378
  - Density: 82.0/km^{2} (212/sq mi)
- Time zone: UTC+01:00 (CET)
  - Summer (DST): UTC+02:00 (CEST)
- INSEE/Postal code: 34043 /34160
- ^{1} French Land Register data, which excludes lakes, ponds, glaciers > 1 km^{2} (0.386 sq mi or 247 acres) and river estuaries.

Buzignargues (French pronunciation: [byziɲaʁɡ]; Occitan: Businhargues) is a commune in the Hérault department in southern France.

== Population ==
Historical population
Year	Pop.	±% p.a.
1968	117	—
1975	124	+0.83%
1982	151	+2.85%
1990	160	+0.73%
1999	199	+2.45%
2007	249	+2.84%
2012	271	+1.71%
2017	337	+4.46%
2023	378	+1.93%
Source: INSEE

== Gallery ==
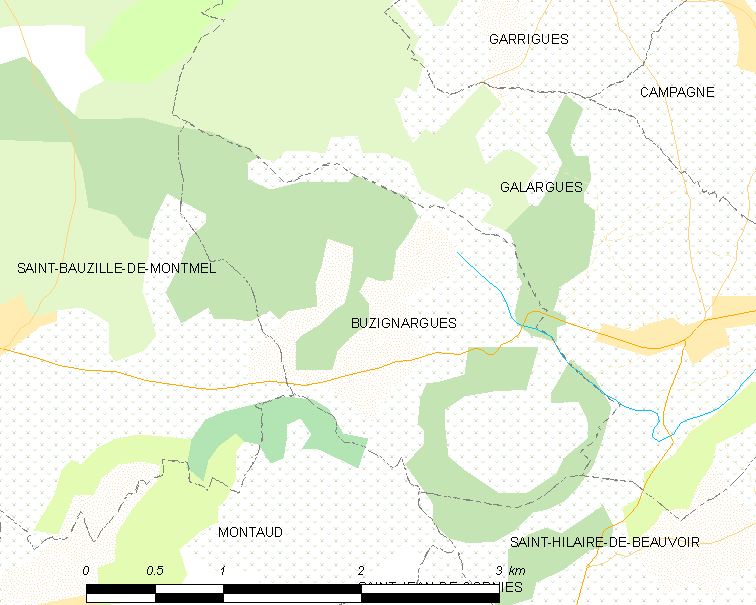
Municipal map

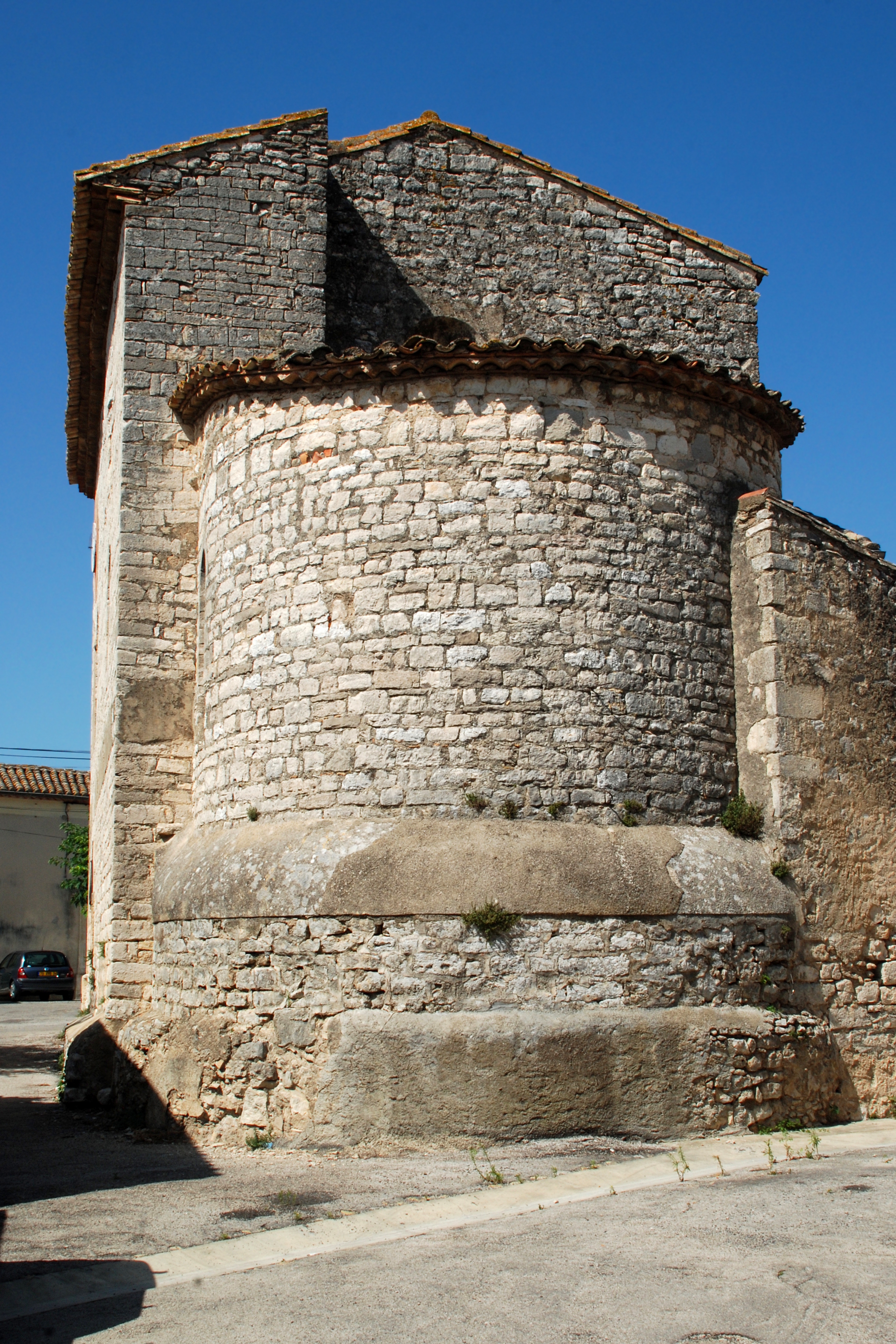
A detail of Saint-Nazaire-et-Saint-Celse church

== See also ==
- Communes of the Hérault department
