= Saint-Bauzille-de-Montmel =

- Commune
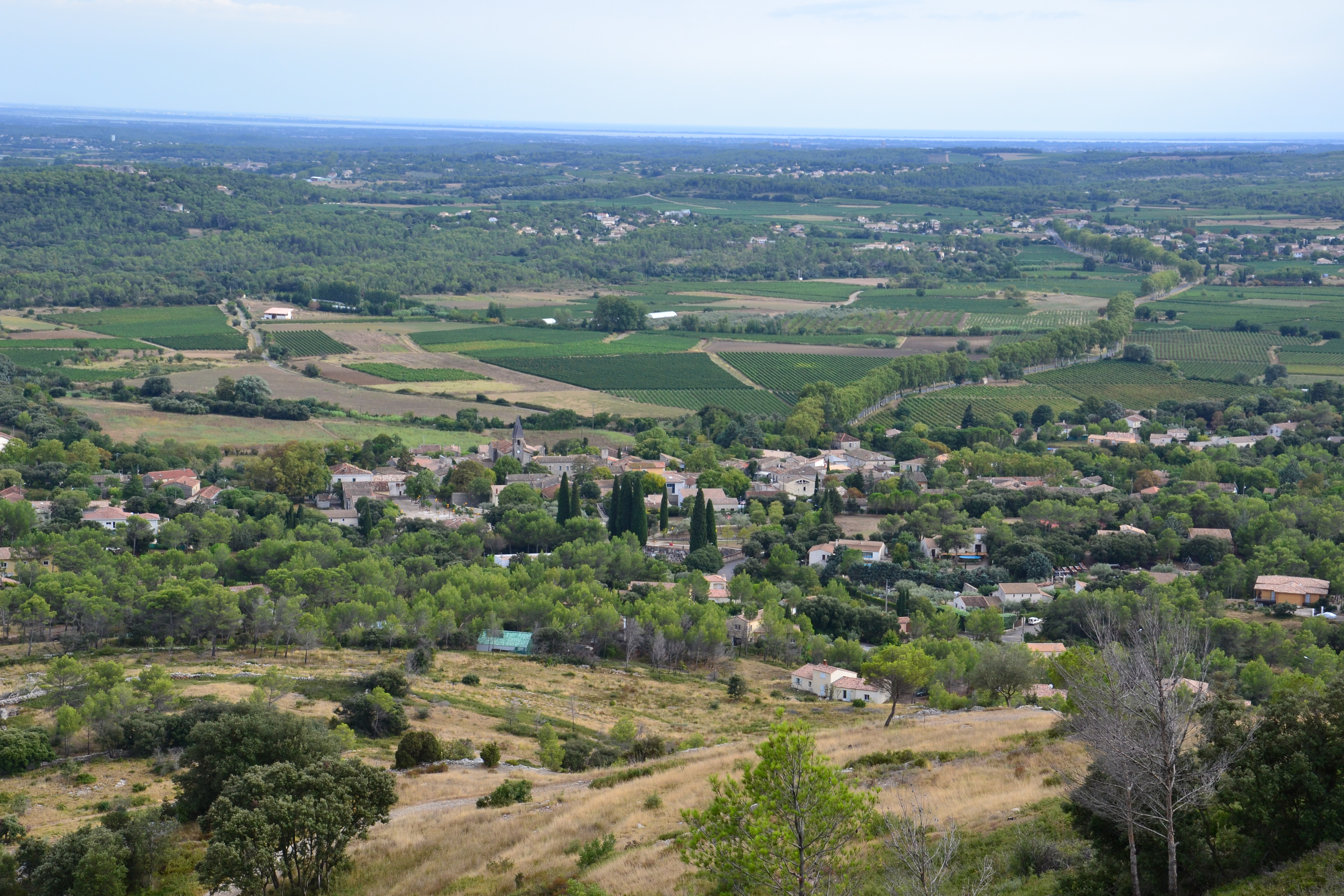
- An aerial view of Saint-Bauzille-de-Montmel

- Coat of arms
- Location of Saint-Bauzille-de-Montmel
- Location within France Location within Occitanie
- Coordinates: 43°46′14″N 3°57′22″E
- Country: France
- Region: Occitania
- Department: Hérault
- Arrondissement: Lodève
- Canton: Saint-Gély-du-Fesc
- Intercommunality: Grand Pic Saint-Loup

Government
  - Mayor (2020–2026): Françoise Matheron
- Area^{1}: 21.52 km^{2} (8.31 sq mi)
- Elevation: 112 m (367 ft)
- Highest elevation: 320 m (1,050 ft)
- Lowest elevation: 62 m (203 ft)
- Population (2023): 1,246
  - Density: 57.90/km^{2} (150.0/sq mi)
- Time zone: UTC+01:00 (CET)
  - Summer (DST): UTC+02:00 (CEST)
- INSEE/Postal code: 34242 /34160
- ^{1} French Land Register data, which excludes lakes, ponds, glaciers > 1 km^{2} (0.386 sq mi or 247 acres) and river estuaries.

Saint-Bauzille-de-Montmel (French pronunciation: [sɛ̃ bozil də mɔ̃mɛl]; Occitan: Sant Bausèli de Montmèl) is a commune in the Hérault department in the Occitanie region in southern France.

== Population ==
Historical population
Year	Pop.	±% p.a.
1968	354	—
1975	370	+0.63%
1982	456	+3.03%
1990	479	+0.62%
1999	734	+4.86%
2007	905	+2.65%
2012	970	+1.40%
2017	1,022	+1.05%
2023	1,246	+3.36%
Source: INSEE

== See also ==
- Communes of the Hérault department
