= Guzargues =

- Commune
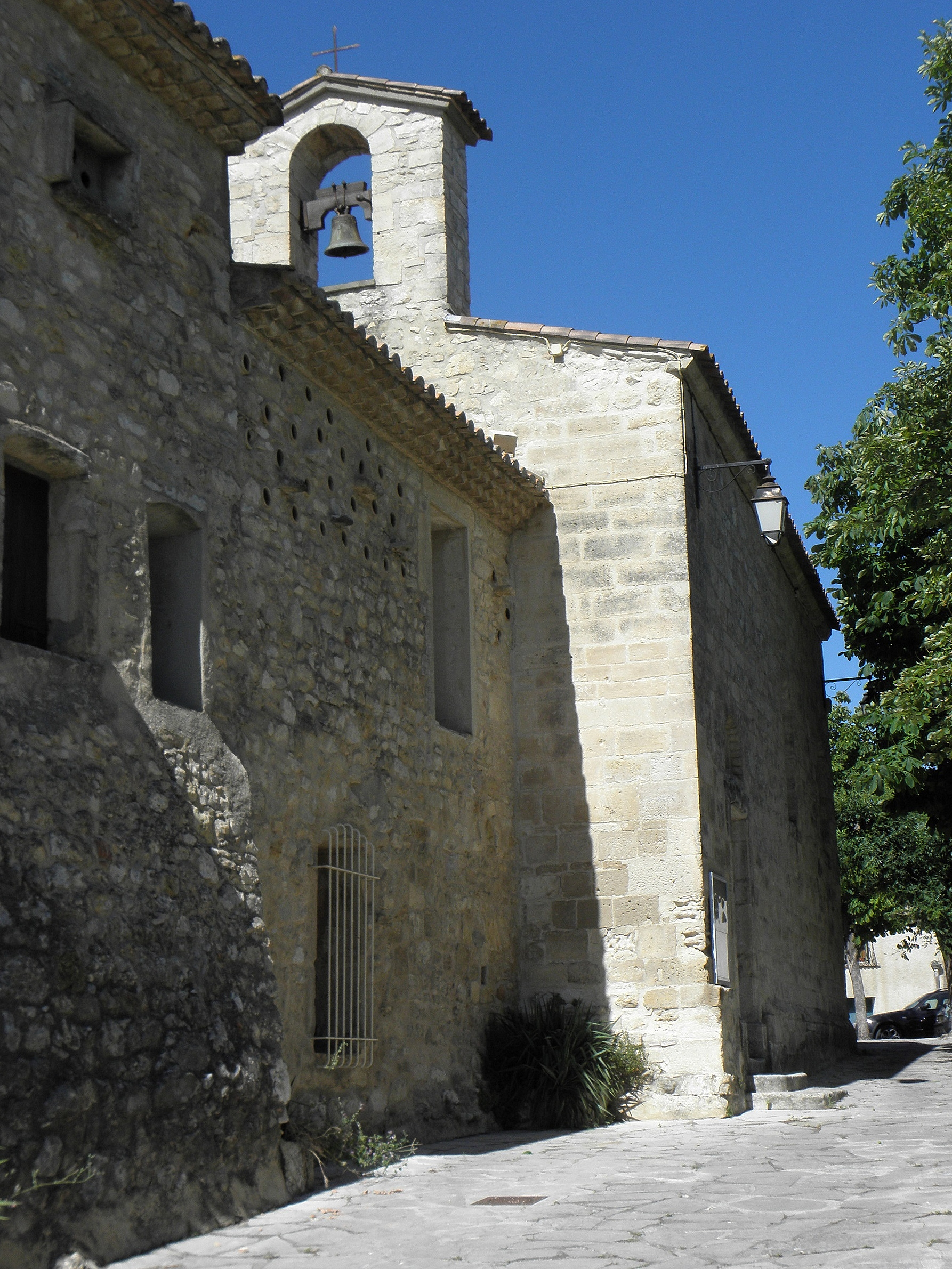
- The parish church of Saint-Michel in Guzargues

- Coat of arms
- Location of Guzargues
- Location within France Location within Occitanie
- Coordinates: 43°43′24″N 3°55′32″E
- Country: France
- Region: Occitania
- Department: Hérault
- Arrondissement: Lodève
- Canton: Saint-Gély-du-Fesc

Government
  - Mayor (2020–2026): Pierre Antoine
- Area^{1}: 11.73 km^{2} (4.53 sq mi)
- Elevation: 97 m (318 ft)
- Highest elevation: 209 m (686 ft)
- Lowest elevation: 80 m (260 ft)
- Population (2023): 502
  - Density: 42.8/km^{2} (111/sq mi)
- Time zone: UTC+01:00 (CET)
  - Summer (DST): UTC+02:00 (CEST)
- INSEE/Postal code: 34118 /34820
- ^{1} French Land Register data, which excludes lakes, ponds, glaciers > 1 km^{2} (0.386 sq mi or 247 acres) and river estuaries.

Guzargues (French pronunciation: [ɡyzaʁɡ]; Occitan: Gusargues) is a commune in the Hérault département in the Occitanie region in southern France.

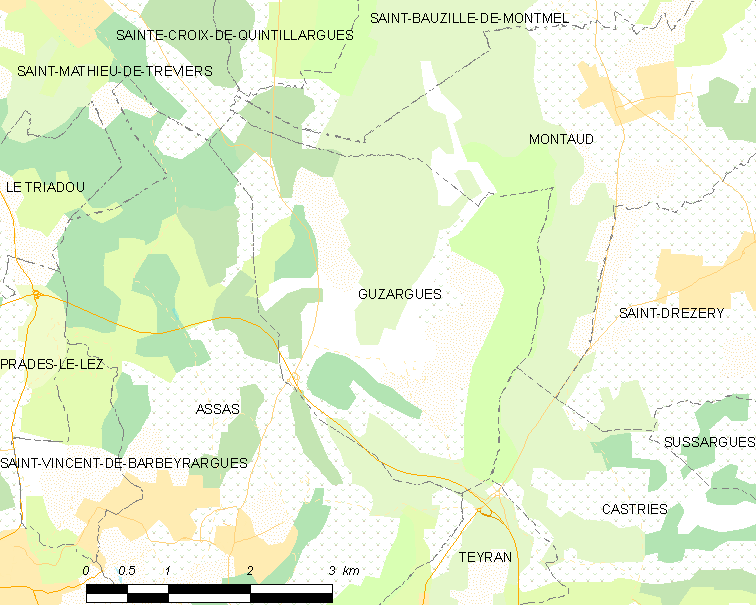
Map

== Population ==
Historical population
Year	Pop.	±% p.a.
1968	116	—
1975	118	+0.24%
1982	149	+3.39%
1990	178	+2.25%
1999	344	+7.60%
2007	414	+2.34%
2012	501	+3.89%
2017	510	+0.36%
2023	502	−0.26%
Source: INSEE

== See also ==
- Communes of the Hérault department
