= Combaillaux =

- Commune
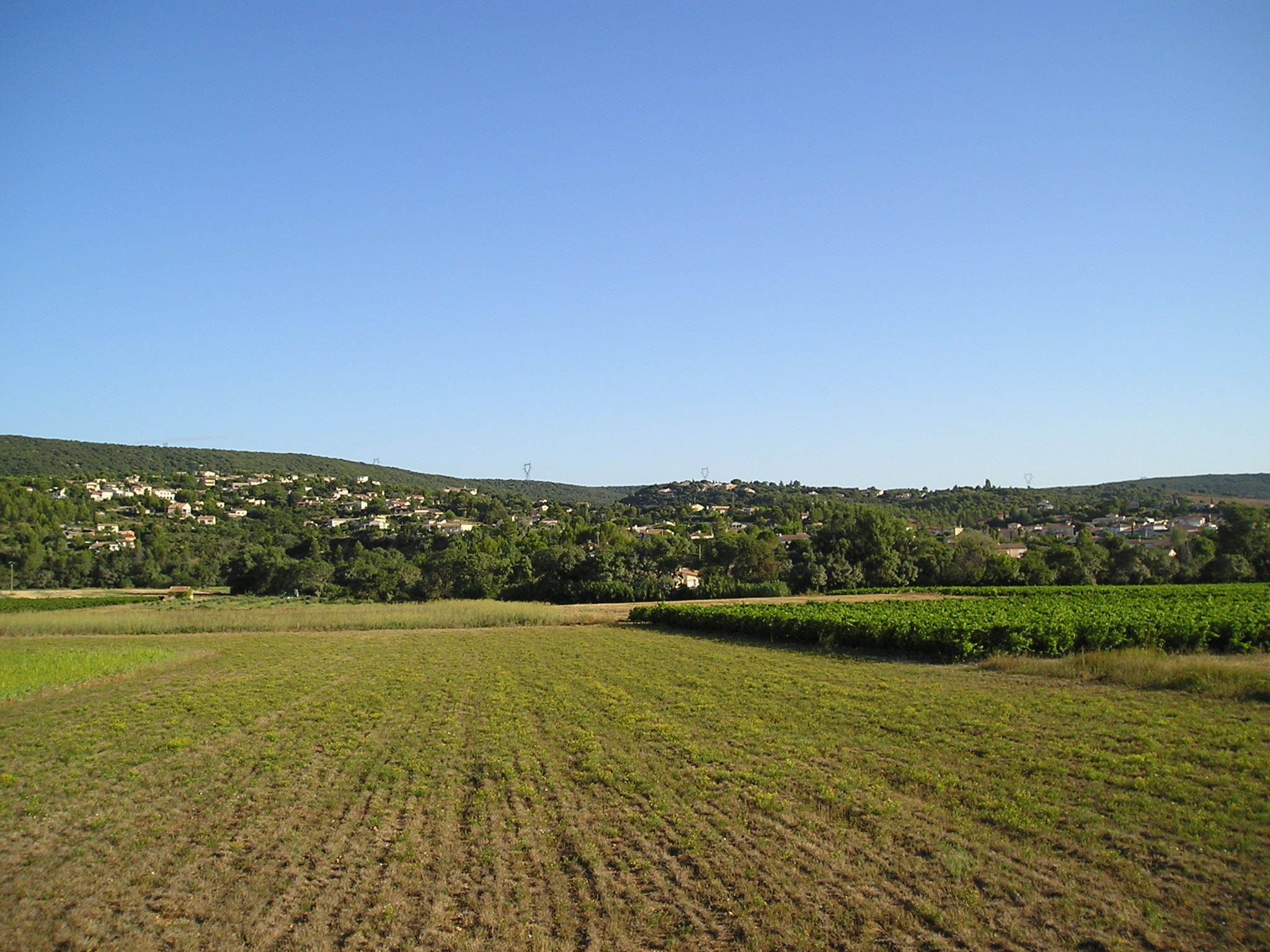
- Combaillaux vineyards and wooded hills

- Coat of arms
- Location of Combaillaux
- Location within France Location within Occitanie
- Coordinates: 43°40′41″N 3°46′02″E
- Country: France
- Region: Occitania
- Department: Hérault
- Arrondissement: Lodève
- Canton: Saint-Gély-du-Fesc

Government
  - Mayor (2020–2026): Daniel Floutard
- Area^{1}: 9.06 km^{2} (3.50 sq mi)
- Highest elevation: 275 m (902 ft)
- Lowest elevation: 63 m (207 ft)
- Population (2023): 2,001
  - Density: 221/km^{2} (572/sq mi)
- Time zone: UTC+01:00 (CET)
  - Summer (DST): UTC+02:00 (CEST)
- INSEE/Postal code: 34082 /34980
- ^{1} French Land Register data, which excludes lakes, ponds, glaciers > 1 km^{2} (0.386 sq mi or 247 acres) and river estuaries.

Combaillaux (French pronunciation: [kɔ̃bajo]; Occitan: Combalhòus) is a commune in the Hérault department in southern France.

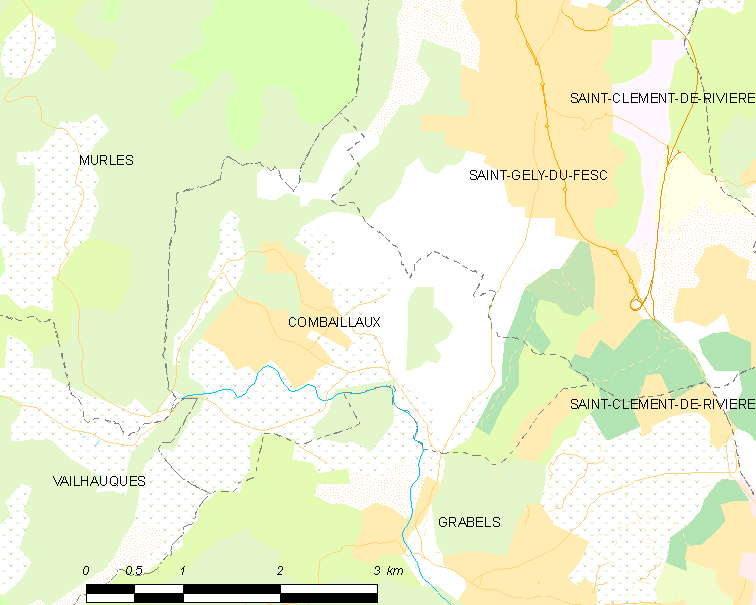
Map

== Population ==
Historical population
Year	Pop.	±% p.a.
1968	194	—
1975	158	−2.89%
1982	446	+15.98%
1990	954	+9.97%
1999	1,285	+3.36%
2007	1,462	+1.63%
2012	1,456	−0.08%
2017	1,487	+0.42%
2023	2,001	+5.07%
Source: INSEE

== See also ==
- Communes of the Hérault department
