= Saint-Mathieu-de-Tréviers =

- Commune
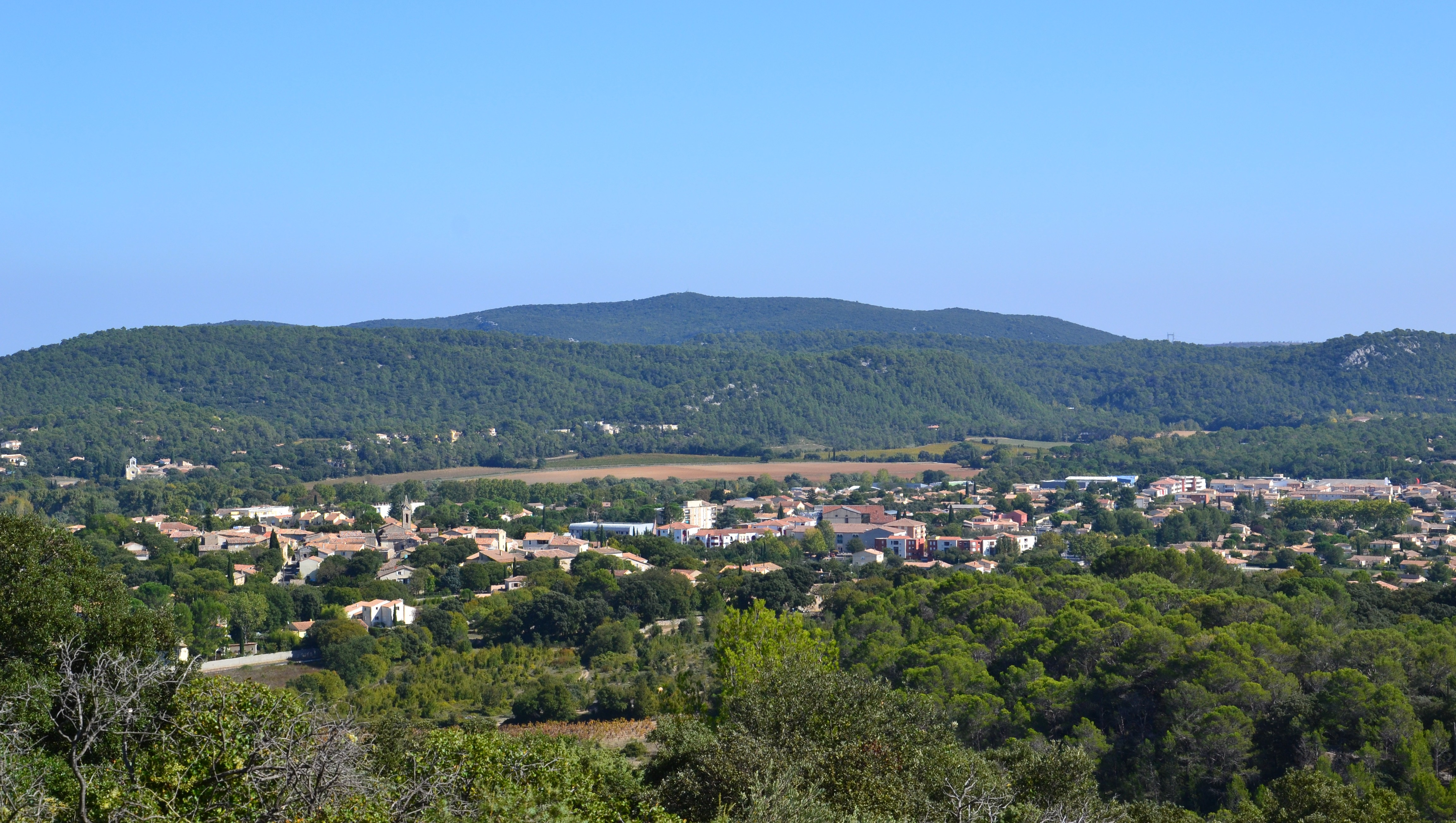
- A general view of Saint-Mathieu-de-Tréviers

- Coat of arms
- Location of Saint-Mathieu-de-Tréviers
- Location within France Location within Occitanie
- Coordinates: 43°46′14″N 3°52′10″E
- Country: France
- Region: Occitania
- Department: Hérault
- Arrondissement: Lodève
- Canton: Saint-Gély-du-Fesc
- Intercommunality: Grand Pic Saint-Loup

Government
  - Mayor (2020–2026): Jerôme Lopez
- Area^{1}: 21.92 km^{2} (8.46 sq mi)
- Elevation: 81 m (266 ft)
- Highest elevation: 400 m (1,300 ft)
- Lowest elevation: 78 m (256 ft)
- Population (2023): 4,979
  - Density: 227.1/km^{2} (588.3/sq mi)
- Time zone: UTC+01:00 (CET)
  - Summer (DST): UTC+02:00 (CEST)
- INSEE/Postal code: 34276 /34270
- ^{1} French Land Register data, which excludes lakes, ponds, glaciers > 1 km^{2} (0.386 sq mi or 247 acres) and river estuaries.

Saint-Mathieu-de-Tréviers (French pronunciation: [sɛ̃ matjø də tʁevje]; Occitan: Sant Matieu de Trevièrs) is a commune in the Hérault department in the Occitanie region in southern France.

== Population ==
Historical population
Year	Pop.	±% p.a.
1968	571	—
1975	954	+7.61%
1982	1,505	+6.73%
1990	2,623	+7.19%
1999	3,713	+3.94%
2007	4,659	+2.88%
2012	4,665	+0.03%
2017	4,790	+0.53%
2023	4,979	+0.65%
Source: INSEE

== See also ==
- Communes of the Hérault department
- Pic Saint-Loup
