= Saint-Jean-de-Cuculles =

- Commune
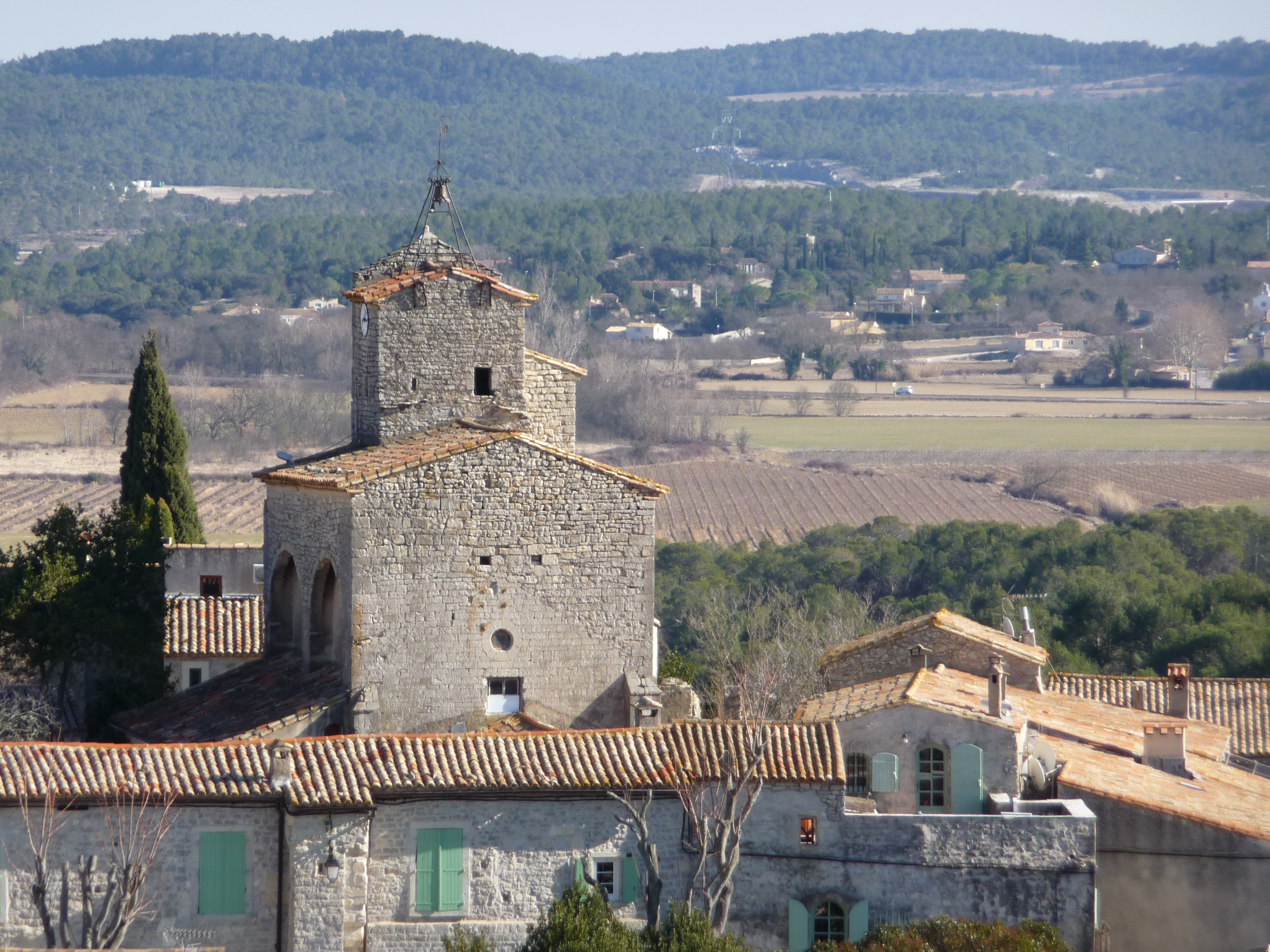
- The church of Saint-Jean-de-Cuculles

- Coat of arms
- Location of Saint-Jean-de-Cuculles
- Location within France Location within Occitanie
- Coordinates: 43°45′12″N 3°50′07″E
- Country: France
- Region: Occitania
- Department: Hérault
- Arrondissement: Lodève
- Canton: Saint-Gély-du-Fesc

Government
  - Mayor (2020–2026): Jean-Pierre Rambier
- Area^{1}: 9.09 km^{2} (3.51 sq mi)
- Elevation: 147 m (482 ft)
- Highest elevation: 459 m (1,506 ft)
- Lowest elevation: 72 m (236 ft)
- Population (2023): 531
  - Density: 58.4/km^{2} (151/sq mi)
- Time zone: UTC+01:00 (CET)
  - Summer (DST): UTC+02:00 (CEST)
- INSEE/Postal code: 34266 /34270
- ^{1} French Land Register data, which excludes lakes, ponds, glaciers > 1 km^{2} (0.386 sq mi or 247 acres) and river estuaries.

Saint-Jean-de-Cuculles (French pronunciation: [sɛ̃ ʒɑ̃ də kykyl]; Occitan: Sant Joan de Cuculas) is a commune in the Hérault department in the Occitanie region in southern France.

== Population ==
Historical population
| Year | Pop. | ±% p.a. |
|---|---|---|
| 1968 | 105 | — |
| 1975 | 147 | +4.92% |
| 1982 | 159 | +1.13% |
| 1990 | 239 | +5.23% |
| 1999 | 352 | +4.40% |
| 2007 | 438 | +2.77% |
| 2012 | 481 | +1.89% |
| 2017 | 483 | +0.08% |
| 2023 | 531 | +1.59% |
Source: INSEE

== See also ==
- Communes of the Hérault department
