= Teyran =

- Commune
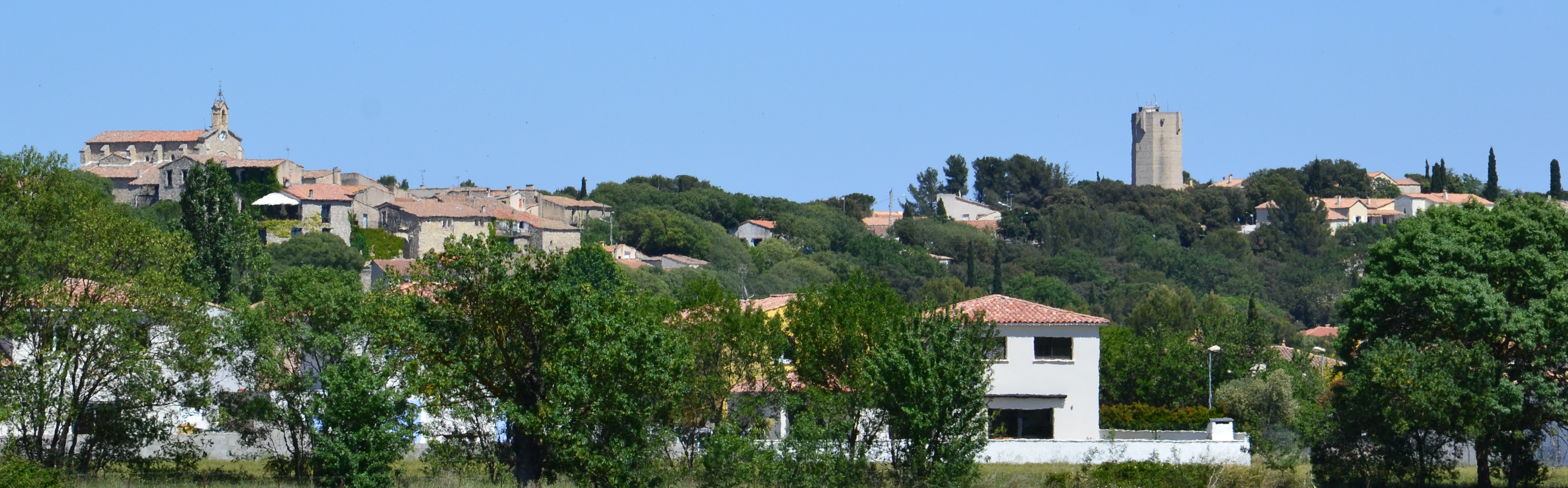
- A general view of Teyran

- Coat of arms
- Location of Teyran
- Location within France Location within Occitanie
- Coordinates: 43°41′07″N 3°55′44″E
- Country: France
- Region: Occitania
- Department: Hérault
- Arrondissement: Lodève
- Canton: Saint-Gély-du-Fesc
- Intercommunality: Grand Pic Saint-Loup

Government
  - Mayor (2020–2026): Eric Bascou
- Area^{1}: 10.04 km^{2} (3.88 sq mi)
- Elevation: 75 m (246 ft)
- Highest elevation: 122 m (400 ft)
- Lowest elevation: 45 m (148 ft)
- Population (2023): 4,787
  - Density: 476.8/km^{2} (1,235/sq mi)
- Time zone: UTC+01:00 (CET)
  - Summer (DST): UTC+02:00 (CEST)
- INSEE/Postal code: 34309 /34820
- ^{1} French Land Register data, which excludes lakes, ponds, glaciers > 1 km^{2} (0.386 sq mi or 247 acres) and river estuaries.

Teyran (French pronunciation: [tɛʁɑ̃]; Occitan: Teiran) is a commune in the Hérault department in the Occitanie region in southern France.

== Population ==
Historical population

Year	Pop.	±% p.a.
1793	190	—
1821	233	+0.73%
1846	279	+0.72%
1872	428	+1.66%
1901	422	−0.05%
1926	436	+0.13%
1946	393	−0.52%
1962	477	+1.22%
1968	555	+2.56%

Year	Pop.	±% p.a.
1975	918	+7.45%
1982	2,016	+11.89%
1990	3,469	+7.02%
1999	4,239	+2.25%
2007	4,260	+0.06%
2012	4,536	+1.26%
2017	4,586	+0.22%
2023	4,787	+0.72%

Source: EHESS and INSEE (1968-2023)

== Notable person ==
- René Lavocat (1909–2007], palaeontogist, died in Teyran

== See also ==
- Communes of the Hérault department
