= Saint-Gély-du-Fesc =

- Commune
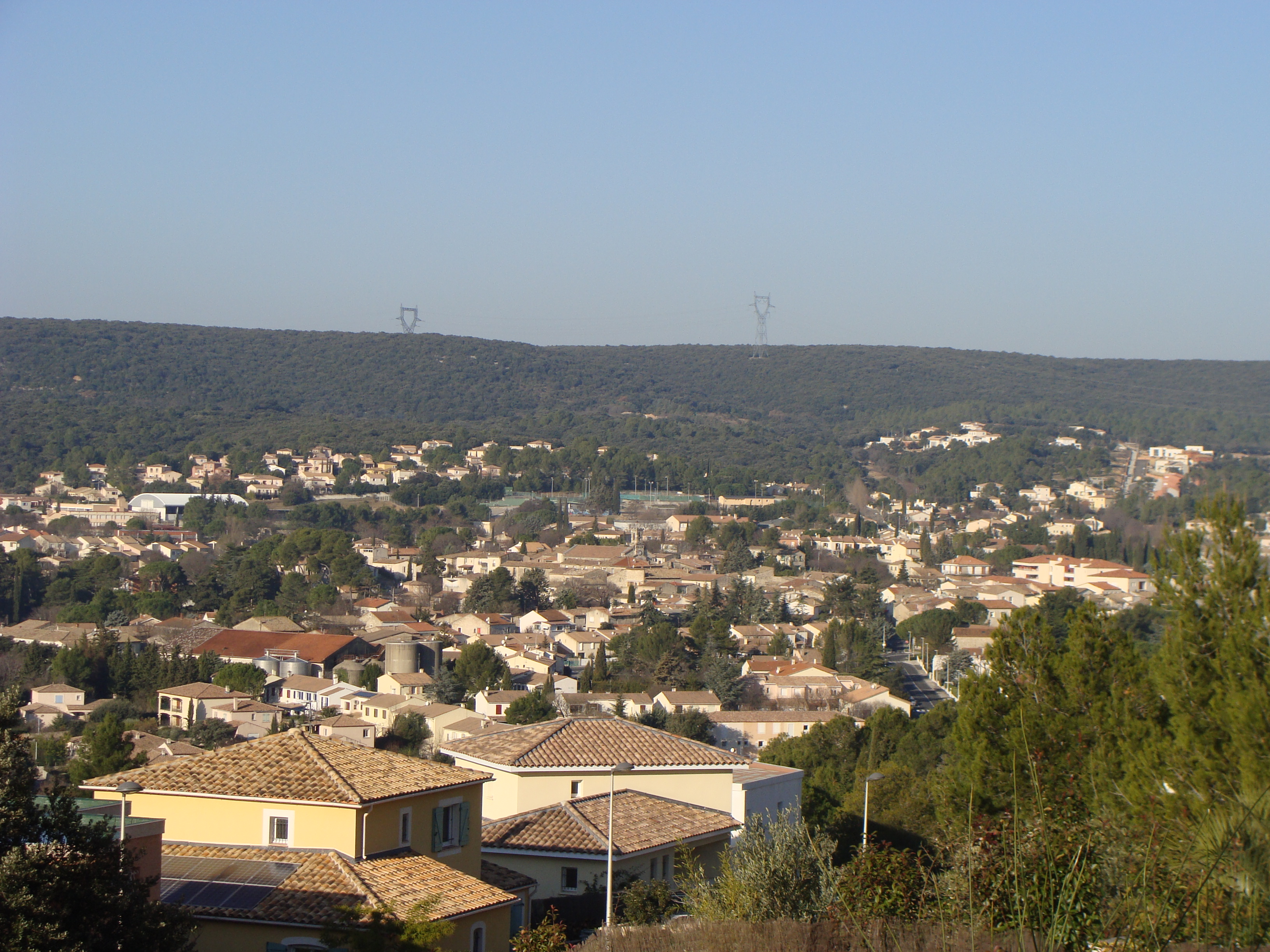
- A general view of Saint-Gély-du-Fesc

- Coat of arms
- Location of Saint-Gély-du-Fesc
- Location within France Location within Occitanie
- Coordinates: 43°41′35″N 3°48′24″E
- Country: France
- Region: Occitania
- Department: Hérault
- Arrondissement: Lodève
- Canton: Saint-Gély-du-Fesc
- Intercommunality: Grand Pic Saint-Loup

Government
  - Mayor (2020–2026): Michèle Lernout
- Area^{1}: 16.51 km^{2} (6.37 sq mi)
- Elevation: 116 m (381 ft)
- Highest elevation: 264 m (866 ft)
- Lowest elevation: 71 m (233 ft)
- Population (2023): 10,472
  - Density: 634.3/km^{2} (1,643/sq mi)
- Time zone: UTC+01:00 (CET)
  - Summer (DST): UTC+02:00 (CEST)
- INSEE/Postal code: 34255 /34980
- ^{1} French Land Register data, which excludes lakes, ponds, glaciers > 1 km^{2} (0.386 sq mi or 247 acres) and river estuaries.

Saint-Gély-du-Fesc (French pronunciation: [sɛ̃ ʒeli dy fɛsk]; Occitan: Sant Geli dau Fesc or Sant Gèli del Fesc) is a commune in the department of Hérault, Occitania, southern France.

The origin of this city is from Saint Gilles, a Christian of the 8th century, and Fesc means « control post » in Occitan language.

In 2004, the city has decided to leave the Agglomeration community of Montpellier Agglomération and join the Communauté de communes du Grand Pic Saint-Loup.

== Population ==
Historical population

| Year | Pop. | ±% p.a. |
|---|---|---|
| 1793 | 305 | — |
| 1800 | 284 | −1.01% |
| 1806 | 354 | +3.74% |
| 1821 | 308 | −0.92% |
| 1831 | 352 | +1.34% |
| 1836 | 377 | +1.38% |
| 1841 | 386 | +0.47% |
| 1846 | 448 | +3.02% |
| 1851 | 450 | +0.09% |
| 1856 | 501 | +2.17% |
| 1861 | 566 | +2.47% |
| 1866 | 603 | +1.27% |
| 1872 | 650 | +1.26% |
| 1876 | 566 | −3.40% |
| 1881 | 515 | −1.87% |
| 1886 | 511 | −0.16% |
| 1891 | 534 | +0.88% |
| 1896 | 632 | +3.43% |
| 1901 | 667 | +1.08% |

| Year | Pop. | ±% p.a. |
|---|---|---|
| 1906 | 641 | −0.79% |
| 1911 | 609 | −1.02% |
| 1921 | 642 | +0.53% |
| 1926 | 632 | −0.31% |
| 1931 | 552 | −2.67% |
| 1936 | 547 | −0.18% |
| 1946 | 548 | +0.02% |
| 1954 | 505 | −1.02% |
| 1962 | 528 | +0.56% |
| 1968 | 907 | +9.44% |
| 1975 | 2,055 | +12.39% |
| 1982 | 3,714 | +8.82% |
| 1990 | 5,936 | +6.04% |
| 1999 | 7,625 | +2.82% |
| 2007 | 8,337 | +1.12% |
| 2012 | 9,222 | +2.04% |
| 2017 | 9,795 | +1.21% |
| 2023 | 10,472 | +1.12% |

Source: EHESS and INSEE (1968-2023)

== Personalities ==
Georges Brassens died in this city, in 1981.

== Places and monuments ==
- Archeological site of the "Vautes", of "Rouergas", and of the "Colline de l'Homme Mort" (dead men hill), who left traces from the Neolithic. (4000 years B-C).
- Church of Saint-Gilles; on top of the steeple, the iron bell tower contains a bell classified "MH", dating from 1759.
- Coulondres-Philippe-Eldridge parc, an 18 hectares site where one can observe several Mediterranean species, as well as a botanical path.

== See also ==
- Communes of the Hérault department
