= Saint-Vincent-de-Barbeyrargues =

- Commune
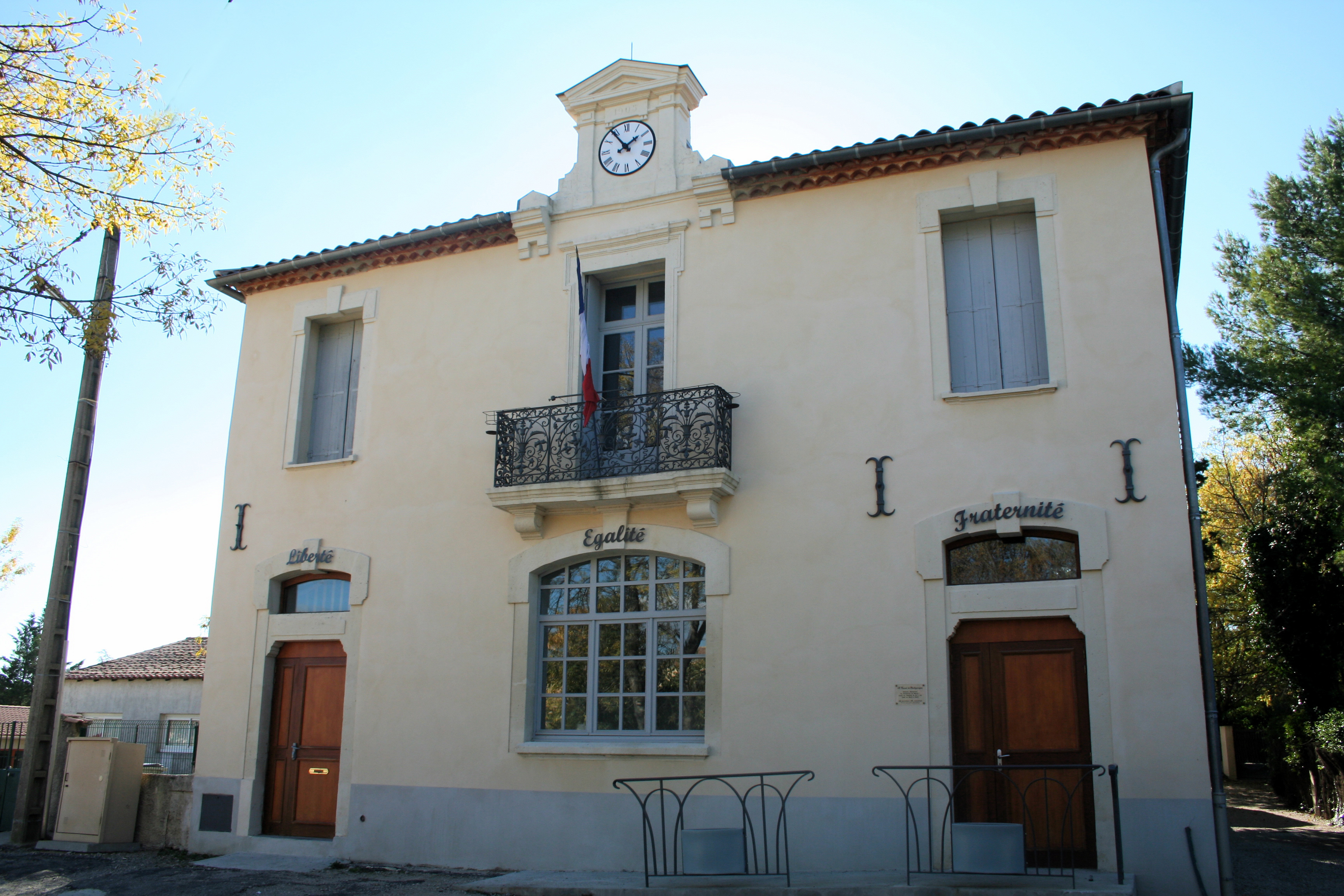
- The town hall in Saint-Vincent-de-Barbeyrargues

- Coat of arms
- Location of Saint-Vincent-de-Barbeyrargues
- Location within France Location within Occitanie
- Coordinates: 43°42′25″N 3°52′41″E
- Country: France
- Region: Occitania
- Department: Hérault
- Arrondissement: Lodève
- Canton: Saint-Gély-du-Fesc
- Intercommunality: Grand Pic Saint Loup

Government
  - Mayor (2020–2026): Frédéric Caussil
- Area^{1}: 2.24 km^{2} (0.86 sq mi)
- Elevation: 125 m (410 ft)
- Highest elevation: 161 m (528 ft)
- Lowest elevation: 65 m (213 ft)
- Population (2023): 775
  - Density: 346/km^{2} (896/sq mi)
- Time zone: UTC+01:00 (CET)
  - Summer (DST): UTC+02:00 (CEST)
- INSEE/Postal code: 34290 /34730
- ^{1} French Land Register data, which excludes lakes, ponds, glaciers > 1 km^{2} (0.386 sq mi or 247 acres) and river estuaries.

Saint-Vincent-de-Barbeyrargues (French pronunciation: [sɛ̃ vɛ̃sɑ̃ də baʁbeʁaʁɡ]; Languedocien: Sant Vincenç de Barbairargues) is a commune in the Hérault department in the Occitanie region in southern France.

== Population ==
Historical population
Year	Pop.	±% p.a.
1968	164	—
1975	261	+6.86%
1982	368	+5.03%
1990	457	+2.74%
1999	567	+2.43%
2007	645	+1.62%
2012	679	+1.03%
2017	666	−0.39%
2023	775	+2.56%
Source: INSEE

== See also ==
- Communes of the Hérault department
