= Les Matelles =

- Commune
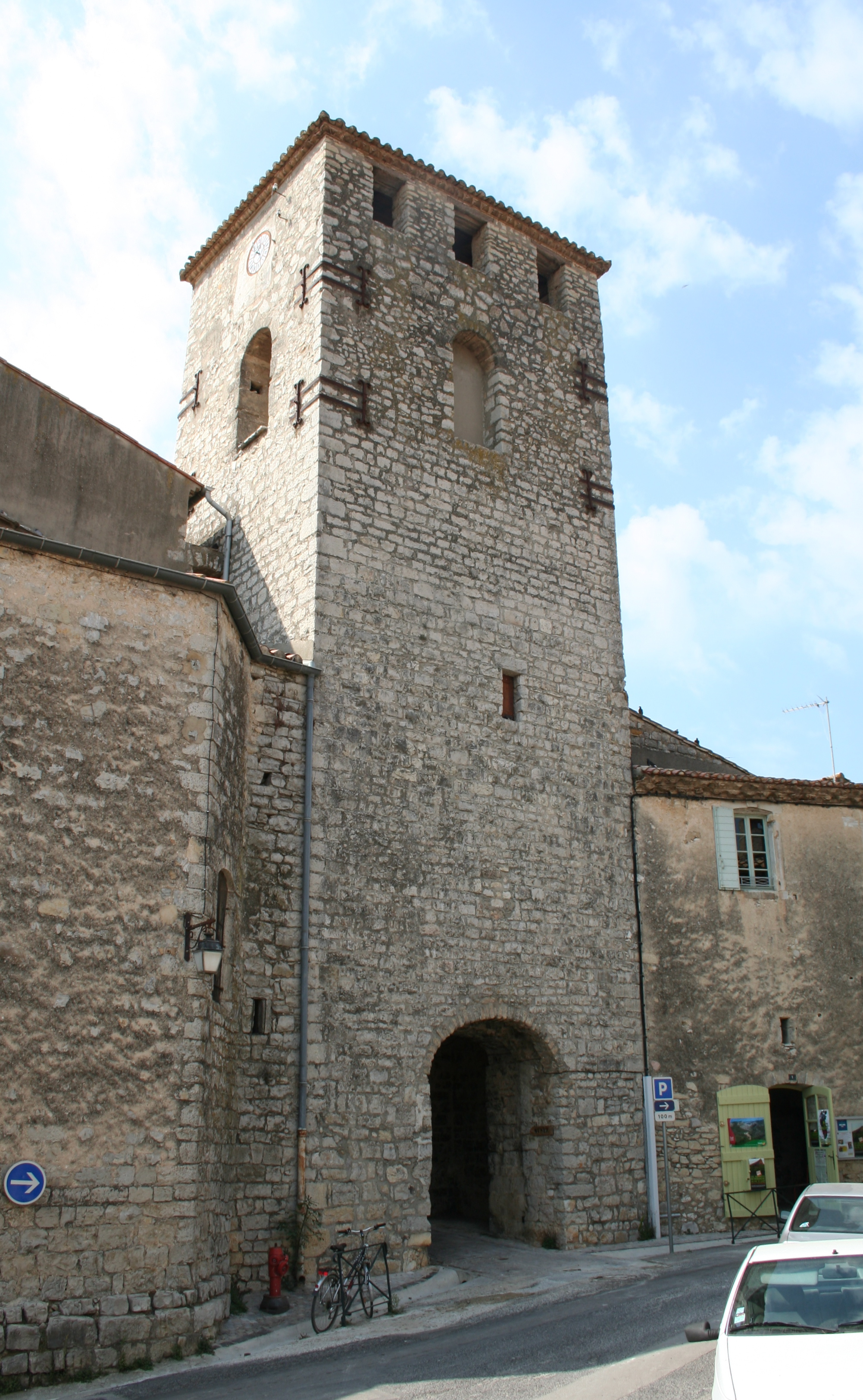
- Tower

- Coat of arms
- Location of Les Matelles
- Location within France Location within Occitanie
- Coordinates: 43°43′53″N 3°48′34″E
- Country: France
- Region: Occitania
- Department: Hérault
- Arrondissement: Lodève
- Canton: Saint-Gély-du-Fesc

Government
  - Mayor (2021–2026): Alain Barbe
- Area^{1}: 16.81 km^{2} (6.49 sq mi)
- Elevation: 100 m (330 ft)
- Highest elevation: 300 m (980 ft)
- Lowest elevation: 60 m (200 ft)
- Population (2023): 2,068
  - Density: 123.0/km^{2} (318.6/sq mi)
- Time zone: UTC+01:00 (CET)
  - Summer (DST): UTC+02:00 (CEST)
- INSEE/Postal code: 34153 /34270
- ^{1} French Land Register data, which excludes lakes, ponds, glaciers > 1 km^{2} (0.386 sq mi or 247 acres) and river estuaries.

Les Matelles (French pronunciation: [le matɛl]; Occitan: Las Matèlas) is a commune in the Hérault department in southern France.

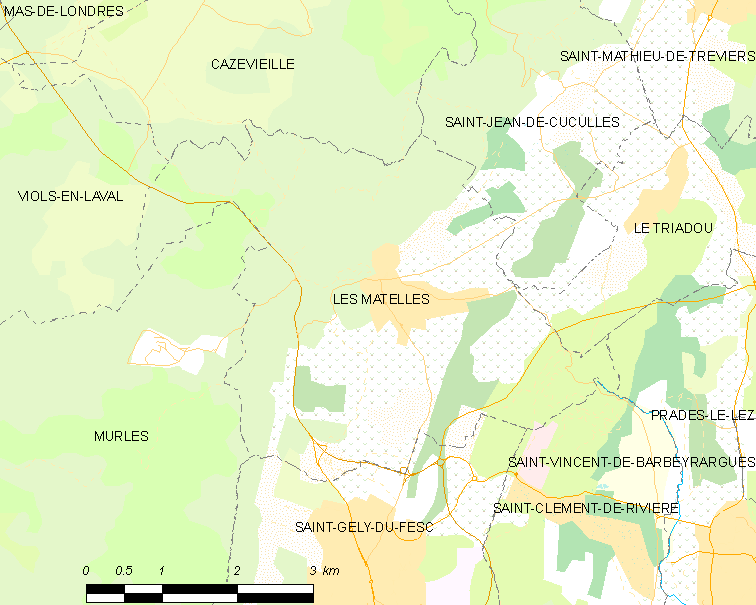
Map

== Population ==
Historical population
| Year | Pop. | ±% p.a. |
|---|---|---|
| 1968 | 328 | — |
| 1975 | 434 | +4.08% |
| 1982 | 780 | +8.74% |
| 1990 | 1,150 | +4.97% |
| 1999 | 1,429 | +2.44% |
| 2007 | 1,538 | +0.92% |
| 2012 | 1,808 | +3.29% |
| 2017 | 2,003 | +2.07% |
| 2023 | 2,068 | +0.53% |
Source: INSEE

== See also ==
- Communes of the Hérault department
