= Prades-le-Lez =

- Commune
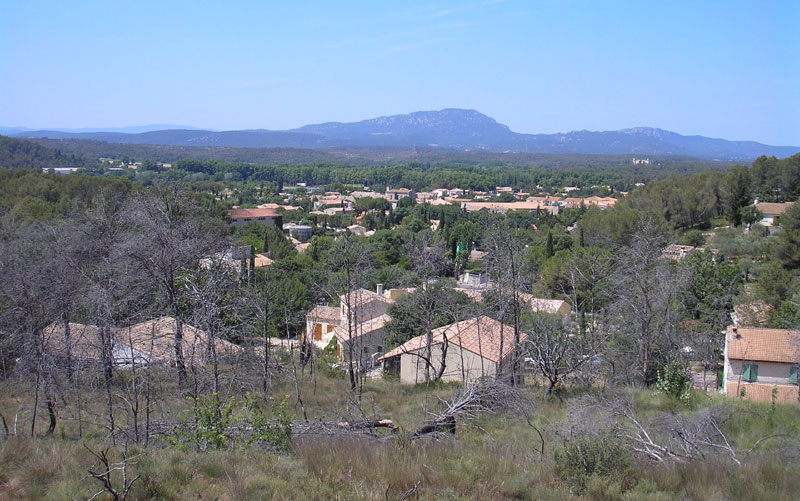
- A general view of Prades-le-Lez

- Coat of arms
- Location of Prades-le-Lez
- Location within France Location within Occitanie
- Coordinates: 43°42′00″N 3°51′56″E
- Country: France
- Region: Occitania
- Department: Hérault
- Arrondissement: Montpellier
- Canton: Saint-Gély-du-Fesc
- Intercommunality: Montpellier Méditerranée Métropole

Government
  - Mayor (2020–2026): Florence Brau
- Area^{1}: 8.88 km^{2} (3.43 sq mi)
- Elevation: 65 m (213 ft)
- Highest elevation: 134 m (440 ft)
- Lowest elevation: 53 m (174 ft)
- Population (2023): 6,184
  - Density: 696/km^{2} (1,800/sq mi)
- Time zone: UTC+01:00 (CET)
  - Summer (DST): UTC+02:00 (CEST)
- INSEE/Postal code: 34217 /34730
- ^{1} French Land Register data, which excludes lakes, ponds, glaciers > 1 km^{2} (0.386 sq mi or 247 acres) and river estuaries.

Prades-le-Lez (French pronunciation: [pʁad lə lɛz]; Occitan: Pradas de Les) is a commune in the Hérault department in the Occitanie region in southern France.

== Geography ==
=== Climate ===
Prades-le-Lez has a mediterranean climate (Köppen climate classification Csa). The average annual temperature in Prades-le-Lez is 14.3 °C (57.7 °F). The average annual rainfall is 852.2 mm (33.55 in) with October as the wettest month. The temperatures are highest on average in July, at around 23.7 °C (74.7 °F), and lowest in January, at around 6.2 °C (43.2 °F). The highest temperature ever recorded in Prades-le-Lez was 44.4 °C (111.9 °F) on 28 June 2019; the coldest temperature ever recorded was −14.6 °C (5.7 °F) on 12 February 2012.

Climate data for Prades-le-Lez (1981–2010 averages, extremes 1980−present)
Month	Jan	Feb	Mar	Apr	May	Jun	Jul	Aug	Sep	Oct	Nov	Dec	Year
Record high °C (°F)	22.0 (71.6)	25.0 (77.0)	28.3 (82.9)	32.3 (90.1)	34.7 (94.5)	44.4 (111.9)	39.5 (103.1)	42.0 (107.6)	38.0 (100.4)	34.3 (93.7)	25.6 (78.1)	21.9 (71.4)	44.4 (111.9)
Mean daily maximum °C (°F)	11.6 (52.9)	12.9 (55.2)	16.3 (61.3)	18.8 (65.8)	23.1 (73.6)	27.9 (82.2)	31.1 (88.0)	30.6 (87.1)	26.0 (78.8)	20.5 (68.9)	15.1 (59.2)	12.1 (53.8)	20.5 (68.9)
Daily mean °C (°F)	6.2 (43.2)	7.1 (44.8)	9.9 (49.8)	12.6 (54.7)	16.5 (61.7)	20.7 (69.3)	23.7 (74.7)	23.3 (73.9)	19.2 (66.6)	15.1 (59.2)	9.9 (49.8)	7.0 (44.6)	14.3 (57.7)
Mean daily minimum °C (°F)	0.9 (33.6)	1.2 (34.2)	3.4 (38.1)	6.5 (43.7)	10.0 (50.0)	13.5 (56.3)	16.3 (61.3)	15.9 (60.6)	12.5 (54.5)	9.8 (49.6)	4.7 (40.5)	1.9 (35.4)	8.1 (46.6)
Record low °C (°F)	−14.6 (5.7)	−14.6 (5.7)	−12.0 (10.4)	−5.5 (22.1)	0.5 (32.9)	4.9 (40.8)	6.8 (44.2)	5.7 (42.3)	2.4 (36.3)	−4.5 (23.9)	−9.6 (14.7)	−10.3 (13.5)	−14.6 (5.7)
Average precipitation mm (inches)	78.2 (3.08)	68.3 (2.69)	43.6 (1.72)	70.1 (2.76)	61.1 (2.41)	46.0 (1.81)	24.1 (0.95)	40.3 (1.59)	106.0 (4.17)	117.7 (4.63)	99.7 (3.93)	97.1 (3.82)	852.2 (33.55)
Average precipitation days (≥ 1.0 mm)	6.5	5.2	4.9	6.8	6.7	4.4	3.0	4.3	5.3	7.5	7.1	6.3	67.8
Source: Meteociel

== Population ==
Historical population

Year	Pop.	±% p.a.
1793	207	—
1851	390	+1.10%
1891	442	+0.31%
1911	511	+0.73%
1926	492	−0.25%
1936	502	+0.20%
1946	419	−1.79%
1954	476	+1.61%
1968	704	+2.83%

Year	Pop.	±% p.a.
1975	917	+3.85%
1982	1,538	+7.67%
1990	3,604	+11.23%
1999	4,361	+2.14%
2007	4,509	+0.42%
2012	4,548	+0.17%
2017	5,467	+3.75%
2023	6,184	+2.08%

Source: EHESS and INSEE (1968-2023)

== See also ==
- Communes of the Hérault department
