= Montoulieu =

Montoulieu may refer to the following places in France:

- Montoulieu, Ariège, a commune in the Ariège department
- Montoulieu, Hérault, a commune in the Hérault department
