= Cazilhac =

Cazilhac may refer to the following places in France:

- Cazilhac, Aude, a commune in the Aude department
- Cazilhac, Hérault, a commune in the Hérault department
