= Les Plans =

Les Plans is the name or part of the name of several communes in France:

- Les Plans, in the Gard department
- Les Plans, in the Hérault department
