= Sorbs, Hérault =

Sorbs
- Commune
- Coat of arms
- Location of Sorbs
- Location within France Location within Occitanie
- Coordinates: 43°53′36″N 3°24′04″E
- Country: France
- Region: Occitania
- Department: Hérault
- Arrondissement: Lodève
- Canton: Lodève
- Intercommunality: Lodévois-Larzac

Government
  - Mayor (2020–2026): Éric Ollier
- Area^{1}: 20.2 km^{2} (7.8 sq mi)
- Elevation: 750 m (2,460 ft)
- Highest elevation: 860 m (2,820 ft)
- Lowest elevation: 480 m (1,570 ft)
- Population (2023): 40
  - Density: 2.0/km^{2} (5.1/sq mi)
- Time zone: UTC+01:00 (CET)
  - Summer (DST): UTC+02:00 (CEST)
- INSEE/Postal code: 34303 /34520
- ^{1} French Land Register data, which excludes lakes, ponds, glaciers > 1 km^{2} (0.386 sq mi or 247 acres) and river estuaries.

Sorbs is a commune in the Hérault department in the Occitanie region in southern France.

== Population ==
Historical population
Year	Pop.	±% p.a.
1968	46	—
1975	42	−1.29%
1982	39	−1.05%
1990	39	+0.00%
1999	52	+3.25%
2007	31	−6.26%
2012	37	+3.60%
2017	35	−1.11%
2023	40	+2.25%
Source: INSEE

== See also ==
- Communes of the Hérault department
