= Saint-Jean-de-Buèges =

- Commune
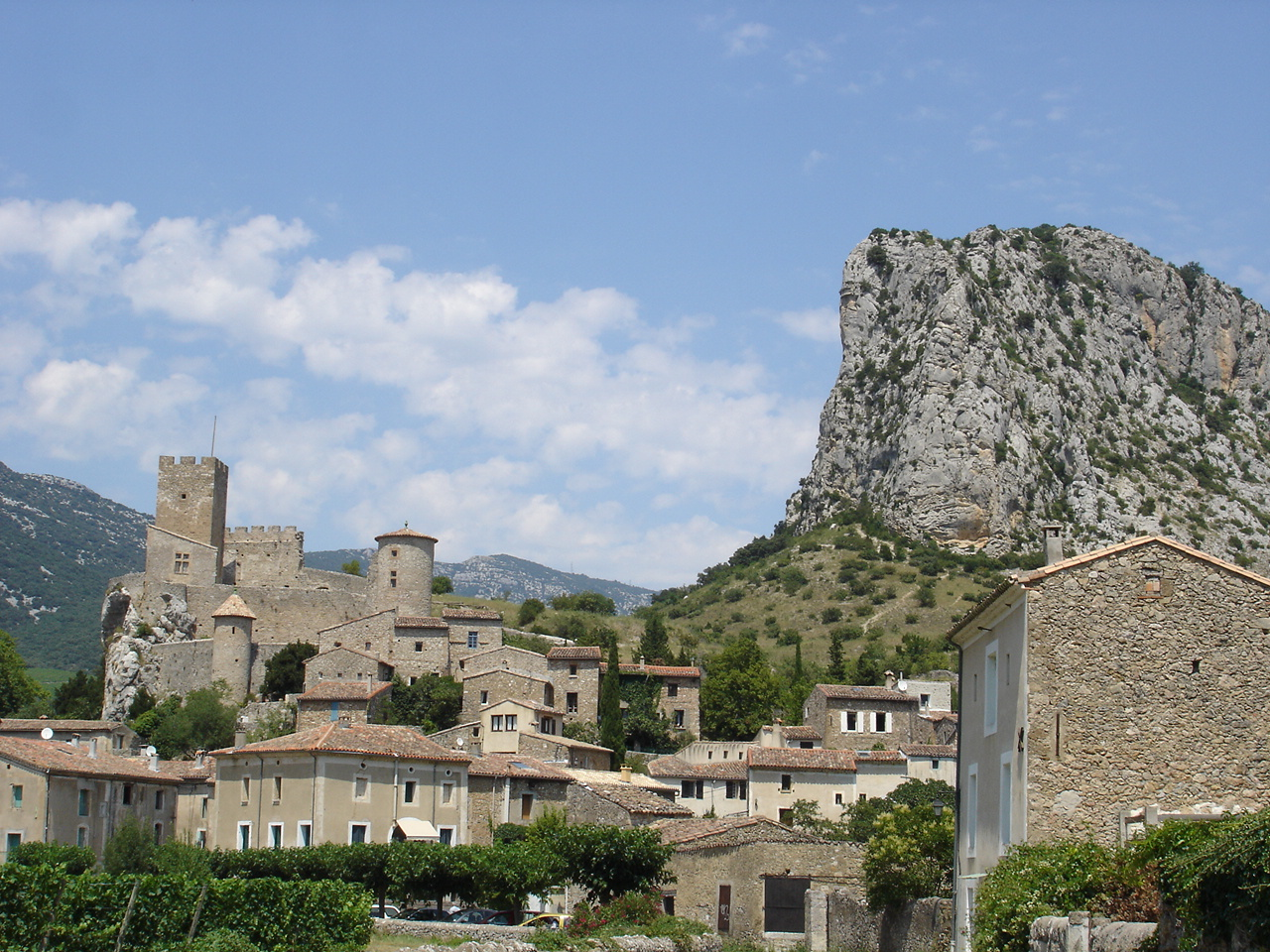
- A general view of Saint-Jean-de-Buèges

- Coat of arms
- Location of Saint-Jean-de-Buèges
- Location within France Location within Occitanie
- Coordinates: 43°49′46″N 3°37′06″E
- Country: France
- Region: Occitania
- Department: Hérault
- Arrondissement: Lodève
- Canton: Lodève

Government
  - Mayor (2020–2026): Laurent Senet
- Area^{1}: 16.9 km^{2} (6.5 sq mi)
- Elevation: 140 m (460 ft)
- Highest elevation: 806 m (2,644 ft)
- Lowest elevation: 144 m (472 ft)
- Population (2023): 208
  - Density: 12.3/km^{2} (31.9/sq mi)
- Time zone: UTC+01:00 (CET)
  - Summer (DST): UTC+02:00 (CEST)
- INSEE/Postal code: 34264 /34380
- ^{1} French Land Register data, which excludes lakes, ponds, glaciers > 1 km^{2} (0.386 sq mi or 247 acres) and river estuaries.

Saint-Jean-de-Buèges (French pronunciation: [sɛ̃ ʒɑ̃ də bɥɛʒ]; Occitan: Sant Joan de Buòja) is a commune in the Hérault department in the Occitanie region in southern France.

== Population ==
Historical population
Year	Pop.	±% p.a.
1968	115	—
1975	123	+0.97%
1982	125	+0.23%
1990	124	−0.10%
1999	184	+4.48%
2007	179	−0.34%
2012	205	+2.75%
2017	197	−0.79%
2023	208	+0.91%
Source: INSEE

== See also ==
- Communes of the Hérault department
