= Saint-Michel, Hérault =

Saint-Michel-d'Alajou
- Commune
- Location of Saint-Michel-d'Alajou
- Location within France Location within Occitanie
- Coordinates: 43°51′24″N 3°23′14″E
- Country: France
- Region: Occitania
- Department: Hérault
- Arrondissement: Lodève
- Canton: Lodève

Government
  - Mayor (2020–2026): Sophie Pradel
- Area^{1}: 25.40 km^{2} (9.81 sq mi)
- Elevation: 792 m (2,598 ft)
- Highest elevation: 861 m (2,825 ft)
- Lowest elevation: 647 m (2,123 ft)
- Population (2023): 60
  - Density: 2.4/km^{2} (6.1/sq mi)
- Time zone: UTC+01:00 (CET)
  - Summer (DST): UTC+02:00 (CEST)
- INSEE/Postal code: 34278 /34520
- ^{1} French Land Register data, which excludes lakes, ponds, glaciers > 1 km^{2} (0.386 sq mi or 247 acres) and river estuaries.

Saint-Michel (French pronunciation: [sɛ̃ miʃɛl]; Occitan: Sant Miquèl), also referred to as Saint-Michel-d'Alajou (French pronunciation: [sɛ̃ miʃɛl dalaʒu]), is a commune in the Hérault department in the Occitanie region in southern France.

== Population ==
Historical population
Year	Pop.	±% p.a.
1968	72	—
1975	50	−5.08%
1982	43	−2.13%
1990	35	−2.54%
1999	44	+2.58%
2007	57	+3.29%
2012	53	−1.44%
2017	48	−1.96%
2023	60	+3.79%
Source: INSEE

== See also ==
- Communes of the Hérault department
