= Viols-en-Laval =

- Commune
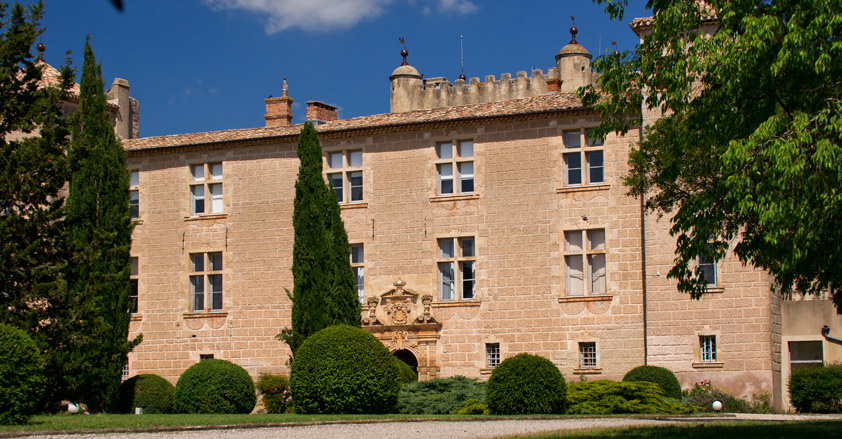
- Chateau of Cambous

- Coat of arms
- Location of Viols-en-Laval
- Location within France Location within Occitanie
- Coordinates: 43°45′15″N 3°43′32″E
- Country: France
- Region: Occitania
- Department: Hérault
- Arrondissement: Lodève
- Canton: Lodève

Government
  - Mayor (2020–2026): Luc Gros
- Area^{1}: 16.03 km^{2} (6.19 sq mi)
- Elevation: 256 m (840 ft)
- Highest elevation: 320 m (1,050 ft)
- Lowest elevation: 186 m (610 ft)
- Population (2023): 231
  - Density: 14.4/km^{2} (37.3/sq mi)
- Time zone: UTC+01:00 (CET)
  - Summer (DST): UTC+02:00 (CEST)
- INSEE/Postal code: 34342 /34380
- ^{1} French Land Register data, which excludes lakes, ponds, glaciers > 1 km^{2} (0.386 sq mi or 247 acres) and river estuaries.

Viols-en-Laval (French pronunciation: [vjɔl(s) ɑ̃ laval]; Occitan: Viòus en la Val) is a commune in the Hérault department in the Occitanie region in southern France.

== Population ==
Historical population
Year	Pop.	±% p.a.
1968	23	—
1975	26	+1.77%
1982	32	+3.01%
1990	82	+12.48%
1999	177	+8.93%
2007	203	+1.73%
2012	207	+0.39%
2017	199	−0.79%
2023	231	+2.52%
Source: INSEE

== See also ==
- Communes of the Hérault department
