= Lauret, Hérault =

Lauret
- Commune
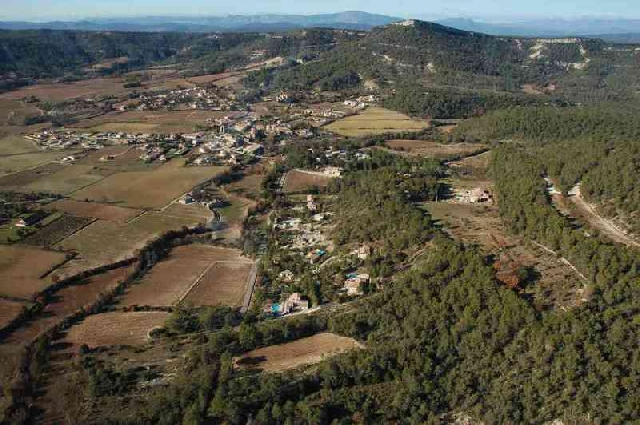
- Lauret

- Coat of arms
- Location of Lauret
- Location within France Location within Occitanie
- Coordinates: 43°50′11″N 3°53′14″E
- Country: France
- Region: Occitania
- Department: Hérault
- Arrondissement: Lodève
- Canton: Lodève

Government
  - Mayor (2020–2026): Stéphane Catania
- Area^{1}: 6.67 km^{2} (2.58 sq mi)
- Elevation: 160 m (520 ft)
- Highest elevation: 400 m (1,300 ft)
- Lowest elevation: 125 m (410 ft)
- Population (2023): 626
  - Density: 93.9/km^{2} (243/sq mi)
- Time zone: UTC+01:00 (CET)
  - Summer (DST): UTC+02:00 (CEST)
- INSEE/Postal code: 34131 /34270
- ^{1} French Land Register data, which excludes lakes, ponds, glaciers > 1 km^{2} (0.386 sq mi or 247 acres) and river estuaries.

Lauret (French pronunciation: [loʁɛt]) is a commune in the Hérault département in the Occitanie region in southern France.

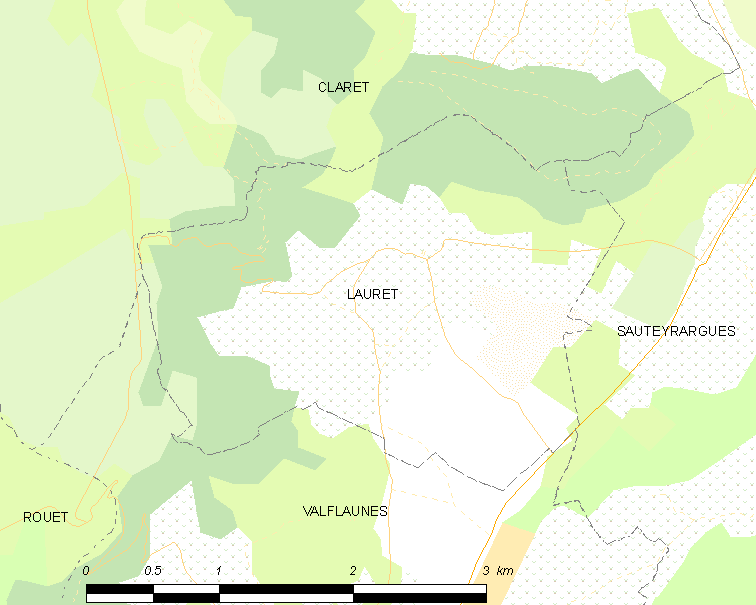
Map

== Population ==
Historical population
Year	Pop.	±% p.a.
1968	166	—
1975	147	−1.72%
1982	169	+2.01%
1990	224	+3.58%
1999	426	+7.40%
2007	561	+3.50%
2012	575	+0.49%
2017	599	+0.82%
2023	626	+0.74%
Source: INSEE

== See also ==
- Communes of the Hérault department
