= Viols-le-Fort =

- Commune
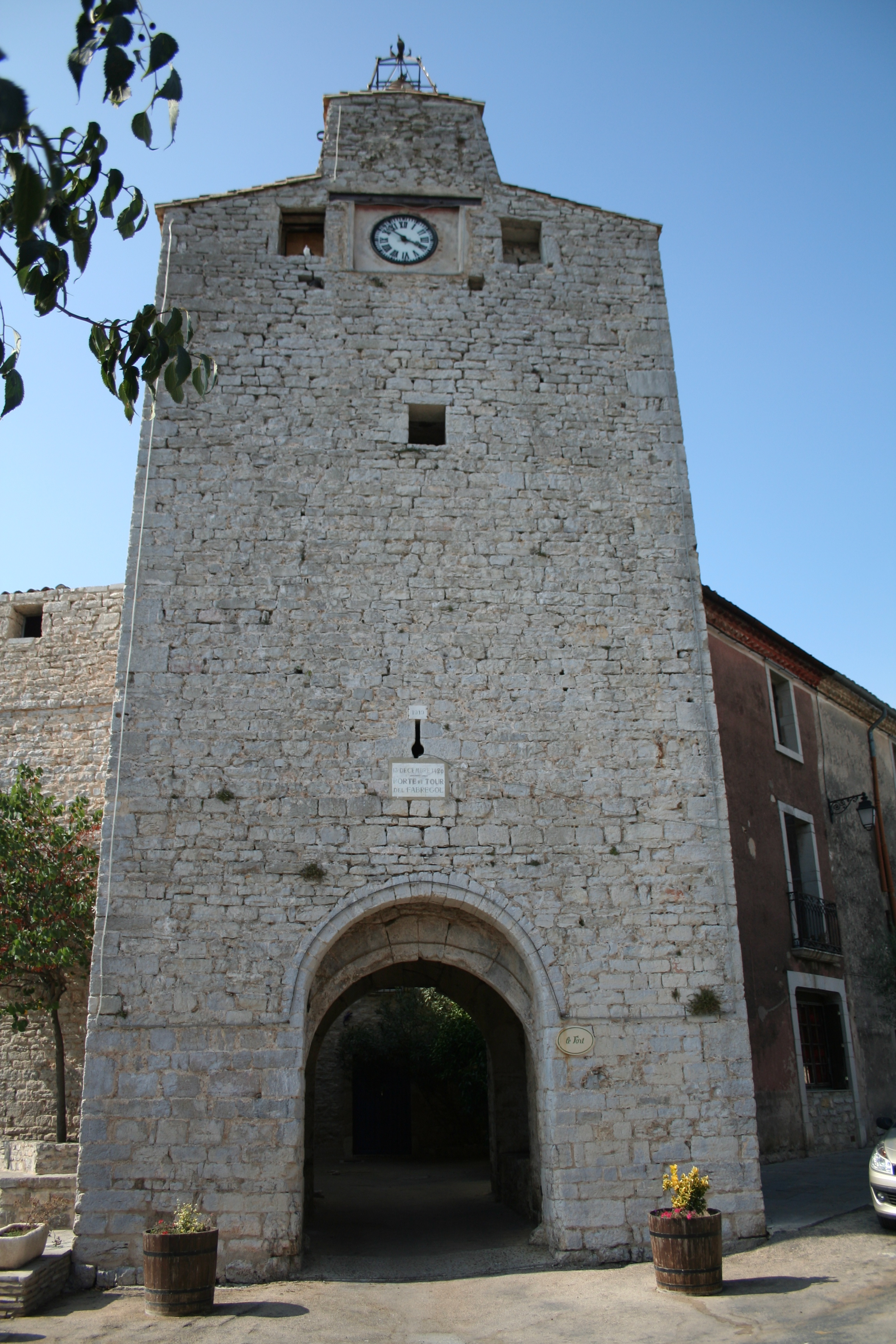
- Gate

- Coat of arms
- Location of Viols-le-Fort
- Location within France Location within Occitanie
- Coordinates: 43°44′39″N 3°42′18″E
- Country: France
- Region: Occitania
- Department: Hérault
- Arrondissement: Lodève
- Canton: Lodève
- Intercommunality: Grand Pic Saint-Loup

Government
  - Mayor (2020–2026): Anne Durand
- Area^{1}: 16.73 km^{2} (6.46 sq mi)
- Elevation: 257 m (843 ft)
- Highest elevation: 535 m (1,755 ft)
- Lowest elevation: 157 m (515 ft)
- Population (2023): 1,229
  - Density: 73.46/km^{2} (190.3/sq mi)
- Time zone: UTC+01:00 (CET)
  - Summer (DST): UTC+02:00 (CEST)
- INSEE/Postal code: 34343 /34380
- ^{1} French Land Register data, which excludes lakes, ponds, glaciers > 1 km^{2} (0.386 sq mi or 247 acres) and river estuaries.

Viols-le-Fort (French pronunciation: [vjɔl(s) lə fɔʁ]; Occitan: Viòus lo Fòrt) is a commune in the Hérault department in the Occitanie region in southern France.

== Population ==
Historical population
Year	Pop.	±% p.a.
1968	358	—
1975	412	+2.03%
1982	493	+2.60%
1990	670	+3.91%
1999	852	+2.71%
2007	1,032	+2.42%
2012	1,174	+2.61%
2017	1,211	+0.62%
2023	1,229	+0.25%
Source: INSEE

== See also ==
- Communes of the Hérault department
