= Mas-de-Londres =

- Commune
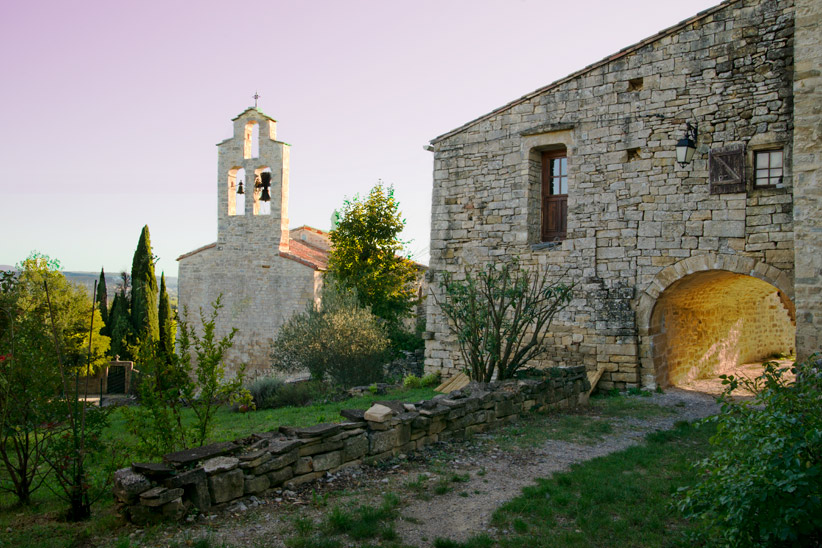
- The church of Saint-Gérard
- Location of Mas-de-Londres
- Location within France Location within Occitanie
- Coordinates: 43°46′56″N 3°45′12″E
- Country: France
- Region: Occitania
- Department: Hérault
- Arrondissement: Lodève
- Canton: Lodève

Government
  - Mayor (2020–2026): Robert Arnal
- Area^{1}: 19.06 km^{2} (7.36 sq mi)
- Elevation: 201 m (659 ft)
- Highest elevation: 400 m (1,300 ft)
- Lowest elevation: 167 m (548 ft)
- Population (2023): 674
  - Density: 35.4/km^{2} (91.6/sq mi)
- Time zone: UTC+01:00 (CET)
  - Summer (DST): UTC+02:00 (CEST)
- INSEE/Postal code: 34152 /34380
- ^{1} French Land Register data, which excludes lakes, ponds, glaciers > 1 km^{2} (0.386 sq mi or 247 acres) and river estuaries.

Mas-de-Londres (French pronunciation: [ma(s) də lɔ̃dʁ]; Occitan: Lo Castèl) is a commune in the Hérault department in southern France.

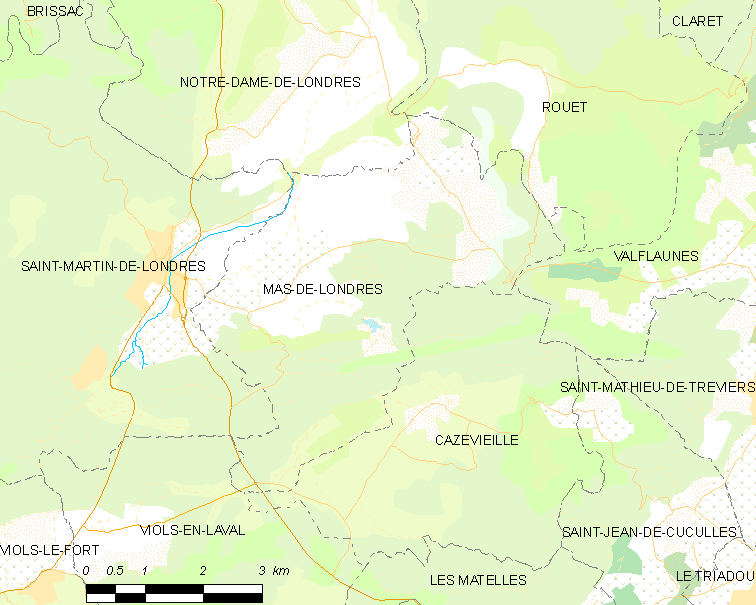
Map

== Population ==
Historical population
Year	Pop.	±% p.a.
1968	129	—
1975	120	−1.03%
1982	183	+6.21%
1990	204	+1.37%
1999	275	+3.37%
2007	329	+2.27%
2012	555	+11.02%
2017	671	+3.87%
2023	674	+0.07%
Source: INSEE

== See also ==
- Communes of the Hérault department
