= Pégairolles-de-Buèges =

Pégairolles-de-Buèges Pegairòlas de Buòja
- Commune
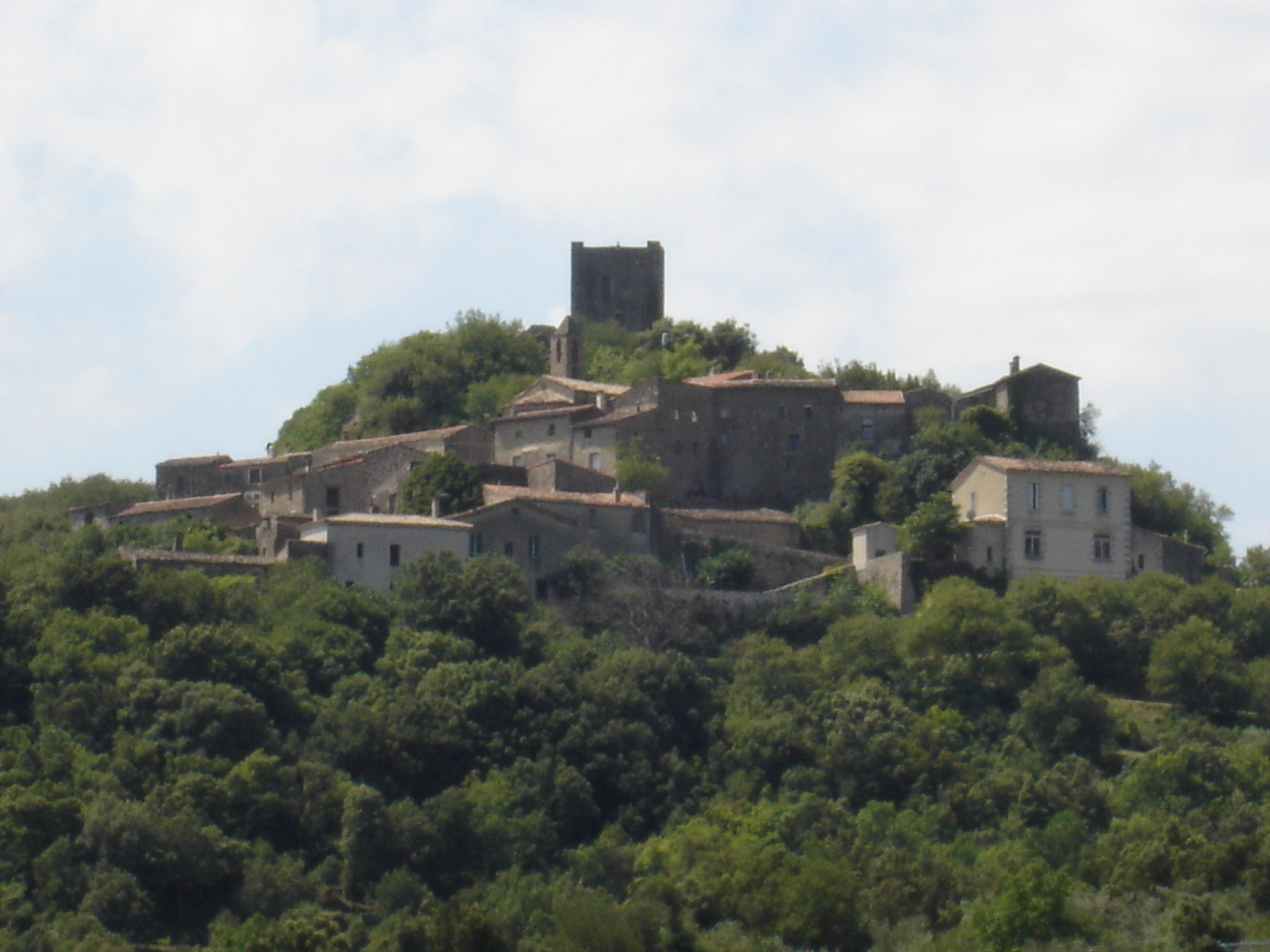
- A general view of Pégairolles-de-Buèges
- Location of Pégairolles-de-Buèges
- Location within France Location within Occitanie
- Coordinates: 43°48′23″N 3°35′15″E
- Country: France
- Region: Occitania
- Department: Hérault
- Arrondissement: Lodève
- Canton: Lodève

Government
  - Mayor (2020–2026): Georges Capus
- Area^{1}: 13.35 km^{2} (5.15 sq mi)
- Elevation: 167 m (548 ft)
- Highest elevation: 780 m (2,560 ft)
- Lowest elevation: 160 m (520 ft)
- Population (2023): 54
  - Density: 4.0/km^{2} (10/sq mi)
- Time zone: UTC+01:00 (CET)
  - Summer (DST): UTC+02:00 (CEST)
- INSEE/Postal code: 34195 /34380
- ^{1} French Land Register data, which excludes lakes, ponds, glaciers > 1 km^{2} (0.386 sq mi or 247 acres) and river estuaries.

Pégairolles-de-Buèges (French pronunciation: [peɡɛʁɔl də bɥɛʒ]; Occitan: Pegairòlas de Buòja) is a commune in the Hérault department in the Occitanie region in southern France.

== Population ==
Historical population
Year	Pop.	±% p.a.
1968	33	—
1975	32	−0.44%
1982	50	+6.58%
1990	42	−2.16%
1999	54	+2.83%
2007	50	−0.96%
2012	43	−2.97%
2017	50	+3.06%
2023	54	+1.29%
Source: INSEE

== See also ==
- Communes of the Hérault department
