= Fozières =

- Commune
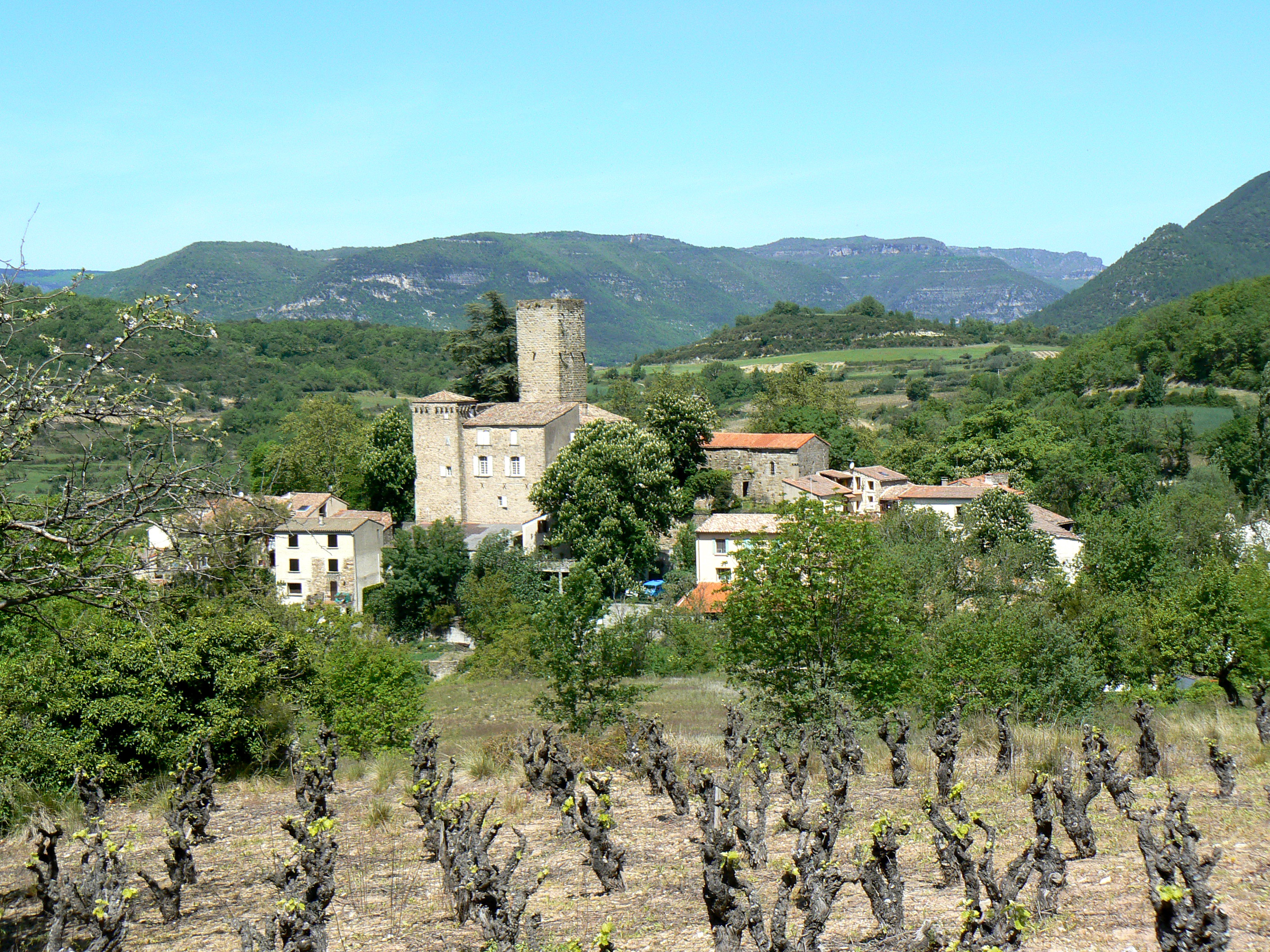
- A general view of Fozières
- Location of Fozières
- Location within France Location within Occitanie
- Coordinates: 43°45′09″N 3°21′28″E
- Country: France
- Region: Occitania
- Department: Hérault
- Arrondissement: Lodève
- Canton: Lodève
- Intercommunality: Lodévois - Larzac

Government
  - Mayor (2020–2026): Michel Combes
- Area^{1}: 5.43 km^{2} (2.10 sq mi)
- Elevation: 420 m (1,380 ft)
- Highest elevation: 680 m (2,230 ft)
- Lowest elevation: 171 m (561 ft)
- Population (2023): 194
  - Density: 35.7/km^{2} (92.5/sq mi)
- Time zone: UTC+01:00 (CET)
  - Summer (DST): UTC+02:00 (CEST)
- INSEE/Postal code: 34106 /34700
- ^{1} French Land Register data, which excludes lakes, ponds, glaciers > 1 km^{2} (0.386 sq mi or 247 acres) and river estuaries.

Fozières (French pronunciation: [fɔzjɛʁ]; Occitan: Fosièiras) is a commune in the Hérault department in southern France.

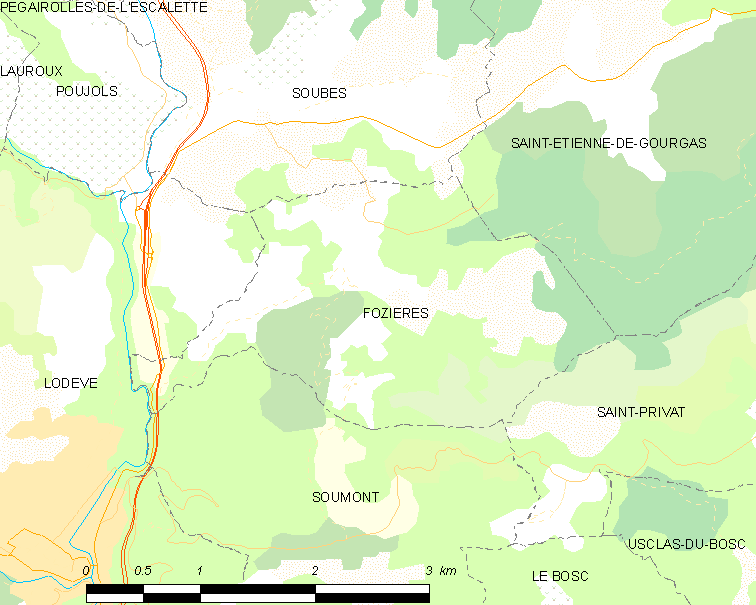
Map

== Population ==
Historical population
Year	Pop.	±% p.a.
1968	65	—
1975	88	+4.42%
1982	119	+4.41%
1990	137	+1.78%
1999	166	+2.16%
2007	152	−1.10%
2012	182	+3.67%
2017	167	−1.71%
2023	194	+2.53%
Source: INSEE

== See also ==
- Communes of the Hérault department
