= Valflaunès =

- Commune
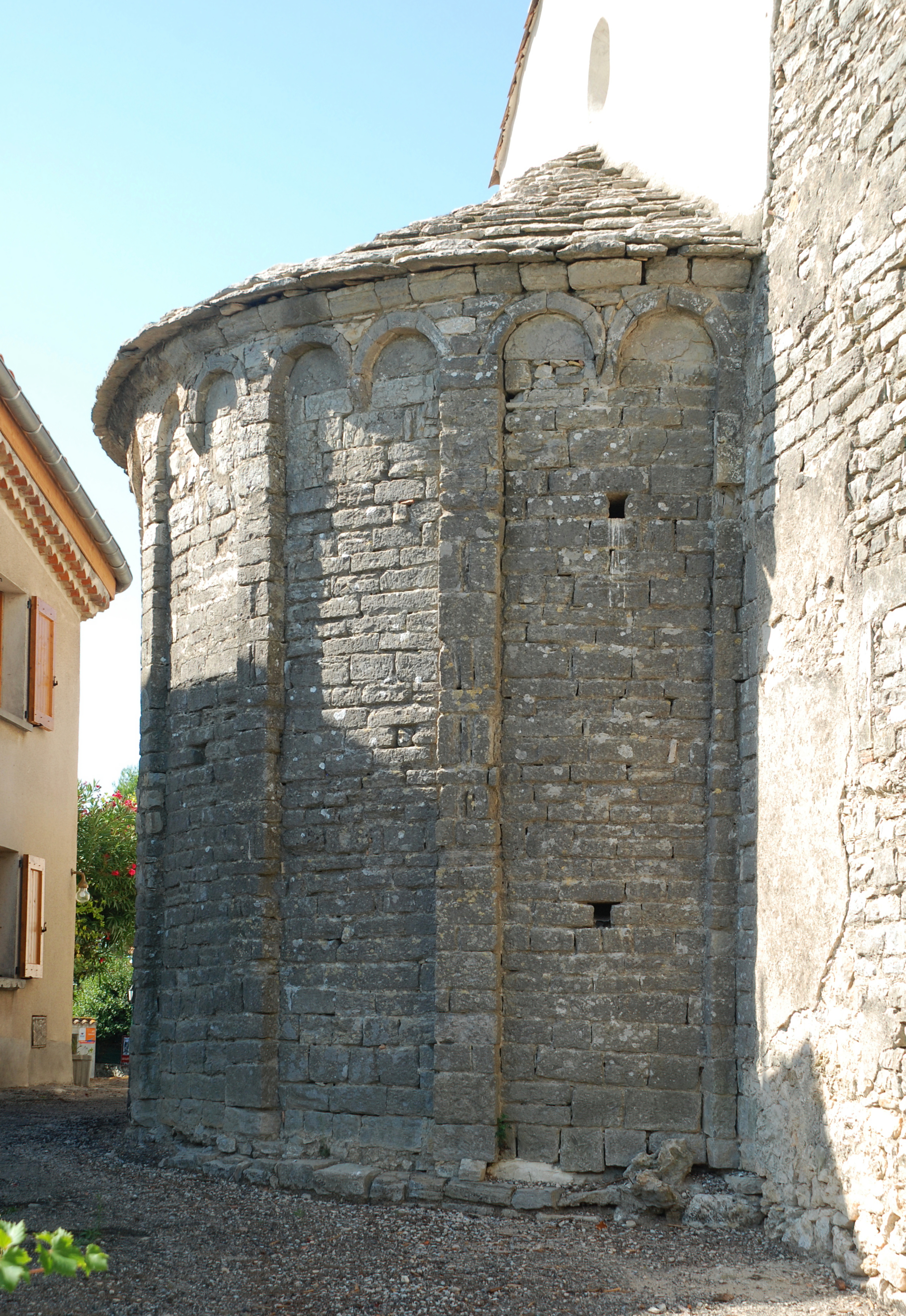
- The church of Valflaunès

- Coat of arms
- Location of Valflaunès
- Location within France Location within Occitanie
- Coordinates: 43°48′05″N 3°52′21″E
- Country: France
- Region: Occitania
- Department: Hérault
- Arrondissement: Lodève
- Canton: Lodève

Government
  - Mayor (2020–2026): Gérard Fabre
- Area^{1}: 21.04 km^{2} (8.12 sq mi)
- Elevation: 87 m (285 ft)
- Highest elevation: 640 m (2,100 ft)
- Lowest elevation: 109 m (358 ft)
- Population (2023): 795
  - Density: 37.8/km^{2} (97.9/sq mi)
- Time zone: UTC+01:00 (CET)
  - Summer (DST): UTC+02:00 (CEST)
- INSEE/Postal code: 34322 /34270
- ^{1} French Land Register data, which excludes lakes, ponds, glaciers > 1 km^{2} (0.386 sq mi or 247 acres) and river estuaries.

Valflaunès (French pronunciation: [valflonɛs]; Occitan: Valfaunés) is a commune in the Hérault department in the Occitanie region southern France.

== Geography ==
=== Climate ===
Valflaunès has a mediterranean climate (Köppen climate classification Csa). The average annual temperature in Valflaunès is 14.5 °C (58.1 °F). The average annual rainfall is 984.5 mm (38.76 in) with October as the wettest month. The temperatures are highest on average in July, at around 23.9 °C (75.0 °F), and lowest in January, at around 6.3 °C (43.3 °F). The highest temperature ever recorded in Valflaunès was 42.4 °C (108.3 °F) on 12 August 2003; the coldest temperature ever recorded was −14.4 °C (6.1 °F) on 5 February 2012.

Climate data for Valflaunès (1981–2010 averages, extremes 1990−2012)
Month	Jan	Feb	Mar	Apr	May	Jun	Jul	Aug	Sep	Oct	Nov	Dec	Year
Record high °C (°F)	22.0 (71.6)	23.4 (74.1)	28.5 (83.3)	33.1 (91.6)	35.3 (95.5)	39.6 (103.3)	38.8 (101.8)	42.4 (108.3)	35.5 (95.9)	33.2 (91.8)	24.0 (75.2)	21.4 (70.5)	42.4 (108.3)
Mean daily maximum °C (°F)	11.6 (52.9)	13.1 (55.6)	16.8 (62.2)	19.3 (66.7)	23.6 (74.5)	28.3 (82.9)	31.4 (88.5)	31.2 (88.2)	25.8 (78.4)	20.4 (68.7)	15.2 (59.4)	11.7 (53.1)	20.7 (69.3)
Daily mean °C (°F)	6.3 (43.3)	7.1 (44.8)	10.3 (50.5)	13.0 (55.4)	17.1 (62.8)	21.1 (70.0)	23.9 (75.0)	23.8 (74.8)	19.2 (66.6)	15.0 (59.0)	9.9 (49.8)	6.6 (43.9)	14.5 (58.1)
Mean daily minimum °C (°F)	0.9 (33.6)	1.0 (33.8)	3.8 (38.8)	6.7 (44.1)	10.5 (50.9)	13.9 (57.0)	16.4 (61.5)	16.5 (61.7)	12.5 (54.5)	9.7 (49.5)	4.7 (40.5)	1.5 (34.7)	8.2 (46.8)
Record low °C (°F)	−10.5 (13.1)	−14.4 (6.1)	−11.0 (12.2)	−2.5 (27.5)	2.3 (36.1)	6.0 (42.8)	7.4 (45.3)	8.0 (46.4)	2.8 (37.0)	−3.0 (26.6)	−7.0 (19.4)	−10.0 (14.0)	−14.4 (6.1)
Average precipitation mm (inches)	85.7 (3.37)	62.0 (2.44)	51.0 (2.01)	79.6 (3.13)	83.4 (3.28)	42.8 (1.69)	27.8 (1.09)	43.3 (1.70)	134.2 (5.28)	159.2 (6.27)	100.0 (3.94)	115.5 (4.55)	984.5 (38.76)
Average precipitation days (≥ 1.0 mm)	6.8	4.6	5.3	6.6	6.8	4.7	3.0	4.1	5.9	8.6	7.9	6.5	70.6
Source: Meteociel

== Population ==
Historical population
Year	Pop.	±% p.a.
1968	251	—
1975	250	−0.06%
1982	398	+6.87%
1990	604	+5.35%
1999	655	+0.90%
2007	704	+0.91%
2012	707	+0.09%
2017	763	+1.54%
2023	795	+0.69%
Source: INSEE

== See also ==
- Communes of the Hérault department
