= Romiguières =

- Commune
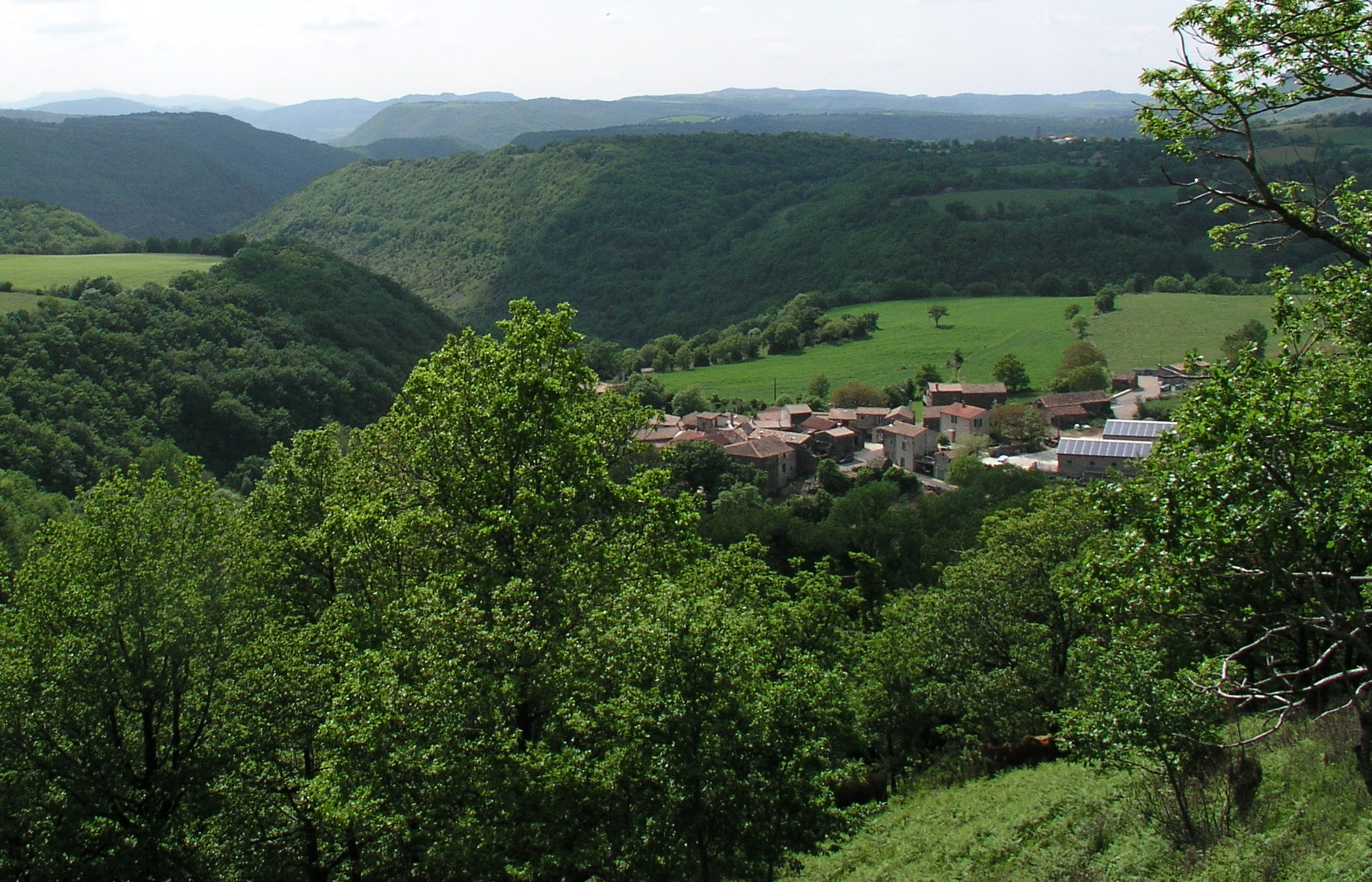

- Coat of arms
- Location of Romiguières
- Location within France Location within Occitanie
- Coordinates: 43°49′09″N 3°13′52″E
- Country: France
- Region: Occitania
- Department: Hérault
- Arrondissement: Lodève
- Canton: Lodève

Government
  - Mayor (2020–2026): Valérie Rouveirol
- Area^{1}: 3.45 km^{2} (1.33 sq mi)
- Elevation: 680 m (2,230 ft)
- Highest elevation: 877 m (2,877 ft)
- Lowest elevation: 554 m (1,818 ft)
- Population (2023): 24
  - Density: 7.0/km^{2} (18/sq mi)
- Time zone: UTC+01:00 (CET)
  - Summer (DST): UTC+02:00 (CEST)
- INSEE/Postal code: 34231 /34650
- ^{1} French Land Register data, which excludes lakes, ponds, glaciers > 1 km^{2} (0.386 sq mi or 247 acres) and river estuaries.

Romiguières (French pronunciation: [ʁɔmiɡjɛʁ]; Occitan: Romiguièiras) is a commune in the Hérault department in the Occitanie region in southern France.

== Population ==
Historical population
Year	Pop.	±% p.a.
1968	14	—
1975	11	−3.39%
1982	9	−2.83%
1990	16	+7.46%
1999	15	−0.71%
2007	22	+4.90%
2012	24	+1.76%
2017	23	−0.85%
2023	24	+0.71%
Source: INSEE

== See also ==
- Communes of the Hérault department
