= Les Rives =

- Commune
- Coat of arms
- Location of Les Rives
- Location within France Location within Occitanie
- Coordinates: 43°50′35″N 3°16′10″E
- Country: France
- Region: Occitania
- Department: Hérault
- Arrondissement: Lodève
- Canton: Lodève
- Intercommunality: Lodévois et Larzac

Government
  - Mayor (2024–2026): Christian Bellas
- Area^{1}: 23.79 km^{2} (9.19 sq mi)
- Elevation: 750 m (2,460 ft)
- Highest elevation: 853 m (2,799 ft)
- Lowest elevation: 640 m (2,100 ft)
- Population (2023): 150
  - Density: 6.3/km^{2} (16/sq mi)
- Time zone: UTC+01:00 (CET)
  - Summer (DST): UTC+02:00 (CEST)
- INSEE/Postal code: 34230 /34520
- ^{1} French Land Register data, which excludes lakes, ponds, glaciers > 1 km^{2} (0.386 sq mi or 247 acres) and river estuaries.

Les Rives (French pronunciation: [le ʁiv]; Occitan: Las Ribas) is a commune in the Hérault department in the Occitanie region in southern France.

== Population ==
Historical population
Year	Pop.	±% p.a.
1968	92	—
1975	72	−3.44%
1982	78	+1.15%
1990	102	+3.41%
1999	127	+2.47%
2007	124	−0.30%
2012	136	+1.86%
2017	144	+1.15%
2023	150	+0.68%
Source: INSEE

== See also ==
- Communes of the Hérault department
