= Moulès-et-Baucels =

- Commune
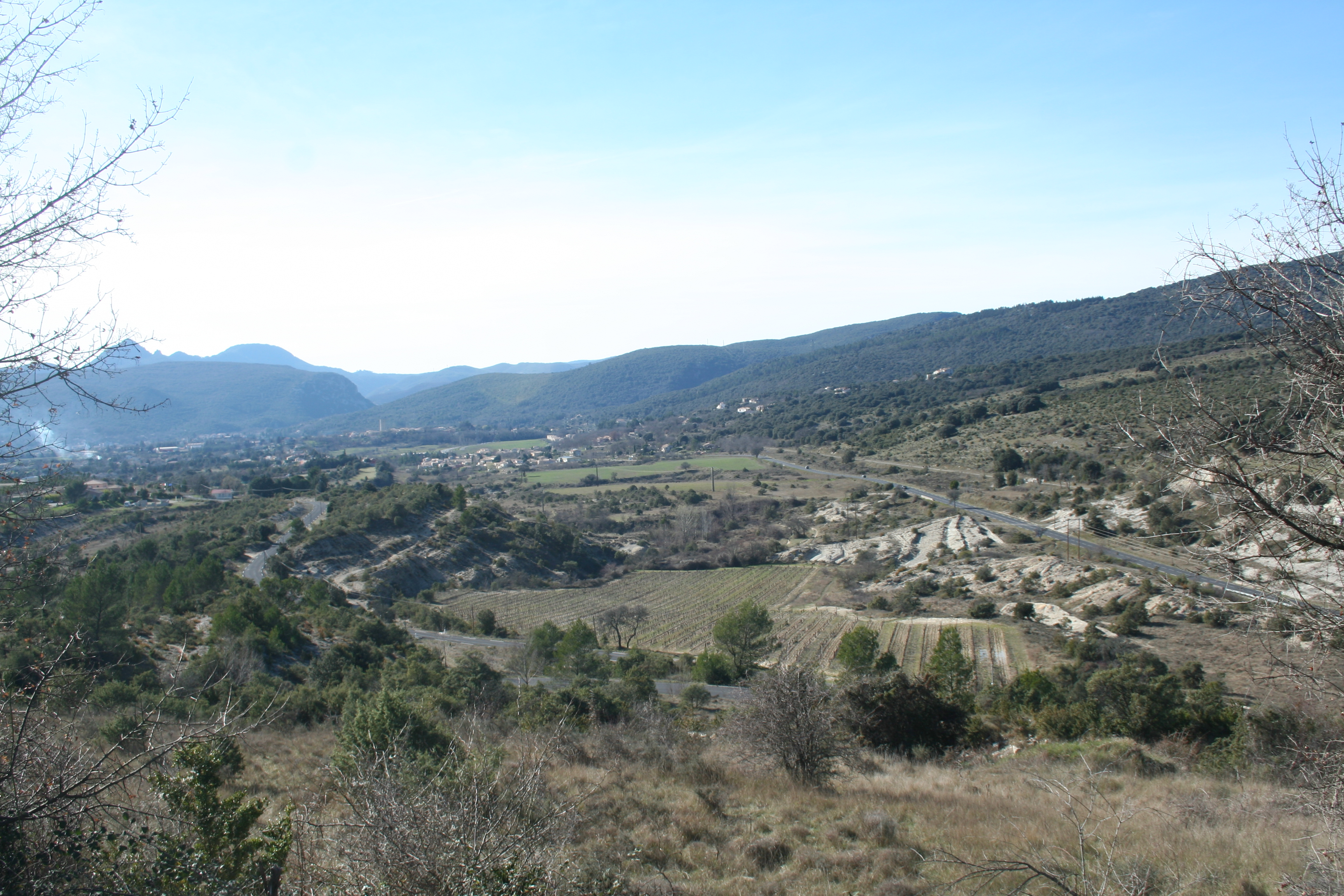
- A general view of Moulès-et-Baucels

- Coat of arms
- Location of Moulès-et-Baucels
- Location within France Location within Occitanie
- Coordinates: 43°56′55″N 3°44′00″E
- Country: France
- Region: Occitania
- Department: Hérault
- Arrondissement: Lodève
- Canton: Lodève
- Intercommunality: Cévennes Gangeoises et Suménoises

Government
  - Mayor (2020–2026): Daniel Célérier
- Area^{1}: 22.78 km^{2} (8.80 sq mi)
- Elevation: 122 m (400 ft)
- Highest elevation: 727 m (2,385 ft)
- Lowest elevation: 156 m (512 ft)
- Population (2023): 875
  - Density: 38.4/km^{2} (99.5/sq mi)
- Time zone: UTC+01:00 (CET)
  - Summer (DST): UTC+02:00 (CEST)
- INSEE/Postal code: 34174 /34190
- ^{1} French Land Register data, which excludes lakes, ponds, glaciers > 1 km^{2} (0.386 sq mi or 247 acres) and river estuaries.

Moulès-et-Baucels (French pronunciation: [mulɛs e bosɛl]; Occitan: Molés e Baucèls) is a commune in the Hérault department in the Occitanie region in southern France.

== Climate ==
Moulès-et-Baucels has a mediterranean climate (Köppen climate classification Csa). The average annual temperature is 14.1 °C (57.4 °F). The average annual rainfall is 1,113.8 mm (43.85 in) with October as the wettest month. The temperatures are highest on average in July, at around 23.6 °C (74.5 °F), and lowest in January, at around 6.1 °C (43.0 °F). The highest temperature ever recorded was 44.3 °C (111.7 °F) on 28 June 2019 and the coldest was −13.5 °C (7.7 °F) on 17 January 1987.

Climate data for Moulès-et-Baucels (1981–2010 averages, extremes 1985−present)
Month	Jan	Feb	Mar	Apr	May	Jun	Jul	Aug	Sep	Oct	Nov	Dec	Year
Record high °C (°F)	22.6 (72.7)	25.7 (78.3)	29.0 (84.2)	30.4 (86.7)	36.5 (97.7)	44.3 (111.7)	40.3 (104.5)	42.6 (108.7)	36.6 (97.9)	32.9 (91.2)	24.7 (76.5)	21.0 (69.8)	44.3 (111.7)
Mean daily maximum °C (°F)	10.9 (51.6)	12.3 (54.1)	15.9 (60.6)	18.3 (64.9)	23.1 (73.6)	27.7 (81.9)	31.3 (88.3)	31.0 (87.8)	25.8 (78.4)	19.5 (67.1)	14.3 (57.7)	11.2 (52.2)	20.2 (68.4)
Daily mean °C (°F)	6.1 (43.0)	6.9 (44.4)	9.9 (49.8)	12.4 (54.3)	16.6 (61.9)	20.5 (68.9)	23.6 (74.5)	23.4 (74.1)	19.1 (66.4)	14.7 (58.5)	9.5 (49.1)	6.6 (43.9)	14.1 (57.4)
Mean daily minimum °C (°F)	1.3 (34.3)	1.6 (34.9)	3.9 (39.0)	6.6 (43.9)	10.1 (50.2)	13.3 (55.9)	16.0 (60.8)	15.8 (60.4)	12.4 (54.3)	9.8 (49.6)	4.8 (40.6)	2.1 (35.8)	8.2 (46.8)
Record low °C (°F)	−13.5 (7.7)	−12.5 (9.5)	−9.1 (15.6)	−3.1 (26.4)	0.5 (32.9)	3.5 (38.3)	8.6 (47.5)	5.5 (41.9)	3.0 (37.4)	−2.9 (26.8)	−9.0 (15.8)	−9.4 (15.1)	−13.5 (7.7)
Average precipitation mm (inches)	104.8 (4.13)	69.5 (2.74)	52.5 (2.07)	97.2 (3.83)	92.5 (3.64)	56.2 (2.21)	30.7 (1.21)	48.7 (1.92)	142.7 (5.62)	185.0 (7.28)	119.3 (4.70)	114.7 (4.52)	1,113.8 (43.85)
Average precipitation days (≥ 1.0 mm)	7.5	6.5	5.0	7.7	8.0	4.9	3.9	4.5	5.8	10.1	7.9	7.0	78.8
Source: Meteociel

== Population ==
Historical population
Year	Pop.	±% p.a.
1968	77	—
1975	128	+7.53%
1982	190	+5.81%
1990	297	+5.74%
1999	598	+8.09%
2007	762	+3.08%
2012	867	+2.62%
2017	877	+0.23%
2023	875	−0.04%
Source: INSEE

== Gallery ==
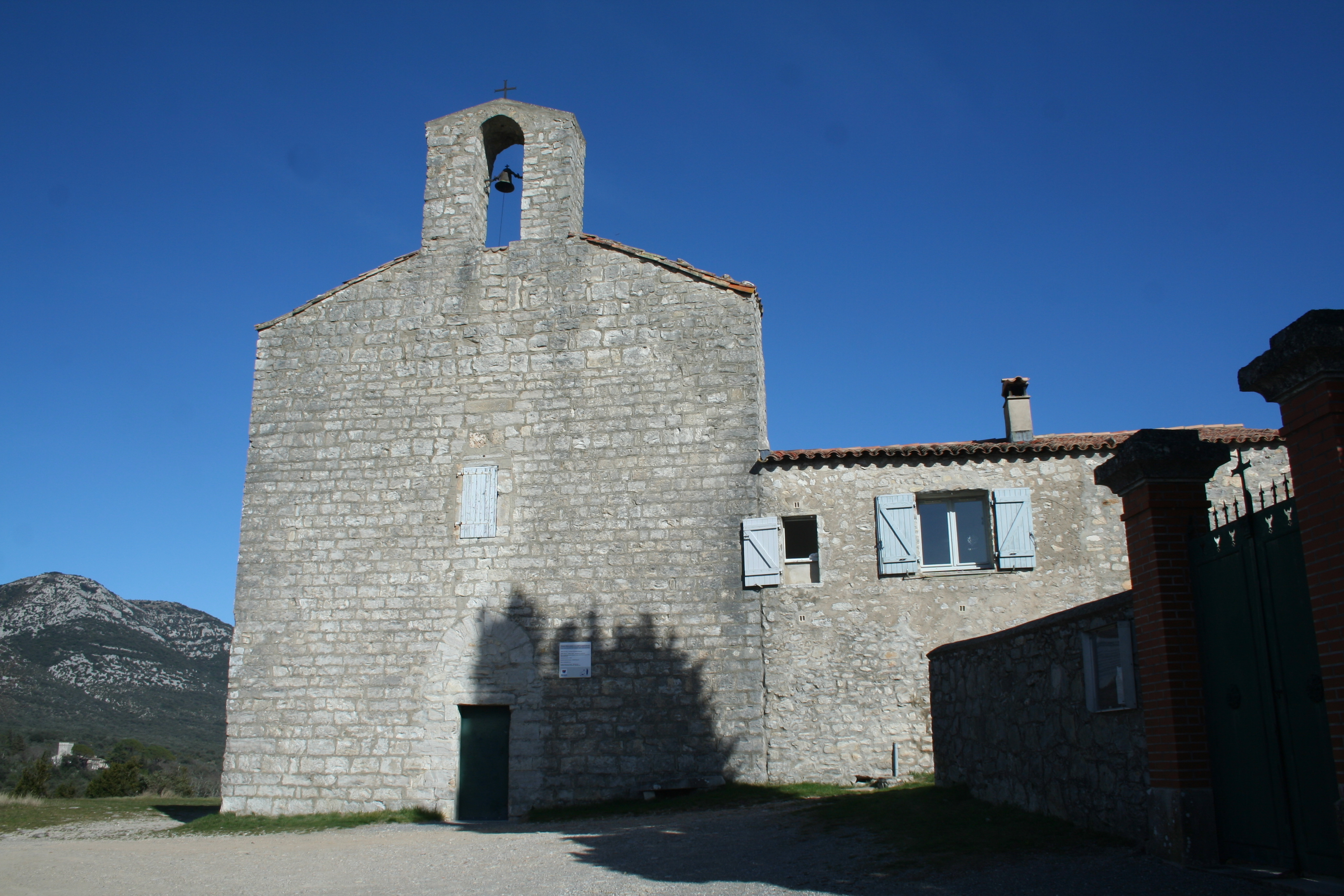
View of the outside of the commune.

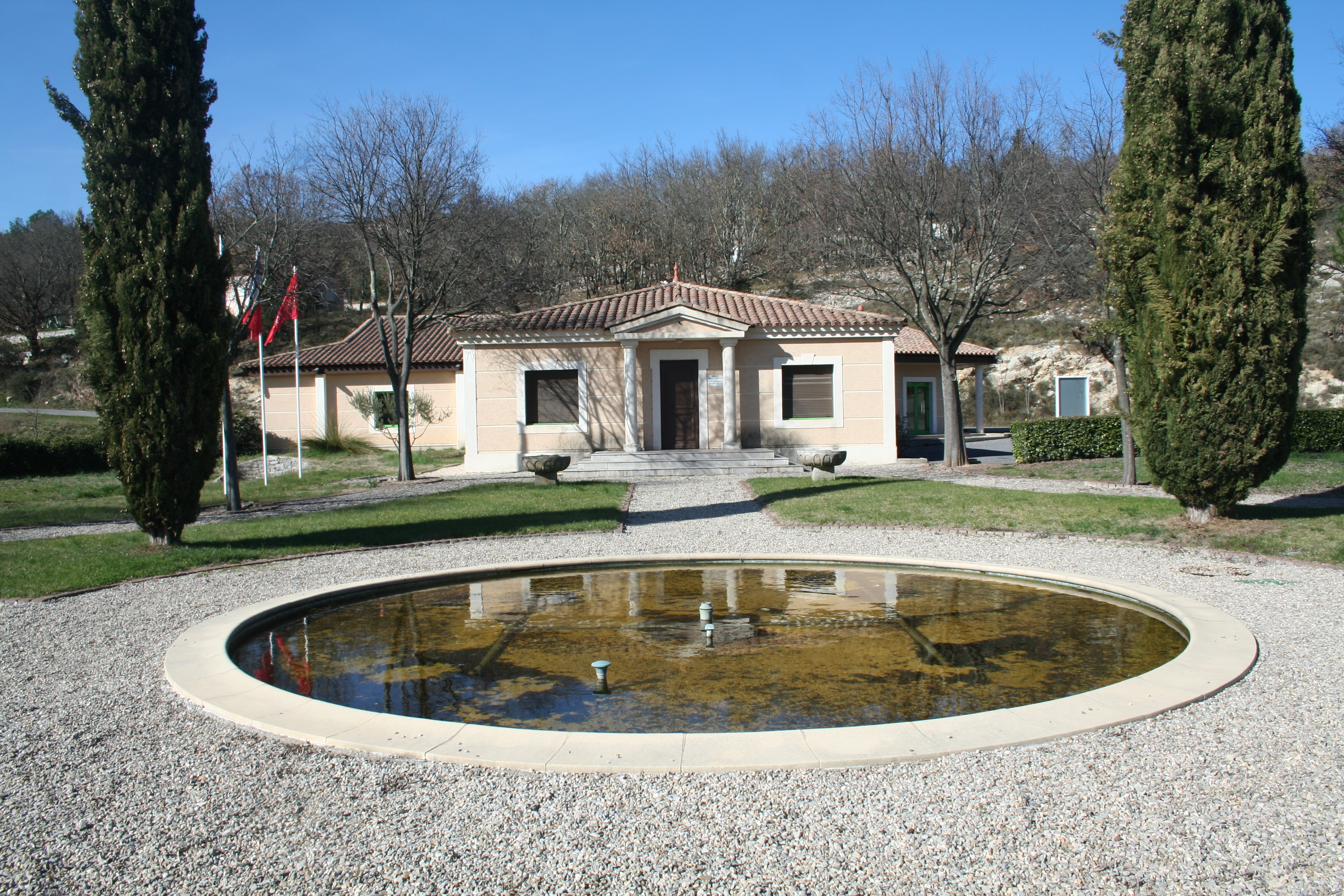
The front of the commune.

== See also ==
- Communes of the Hérault department
