= Rouet, Hérault =

Rouet
- Commune
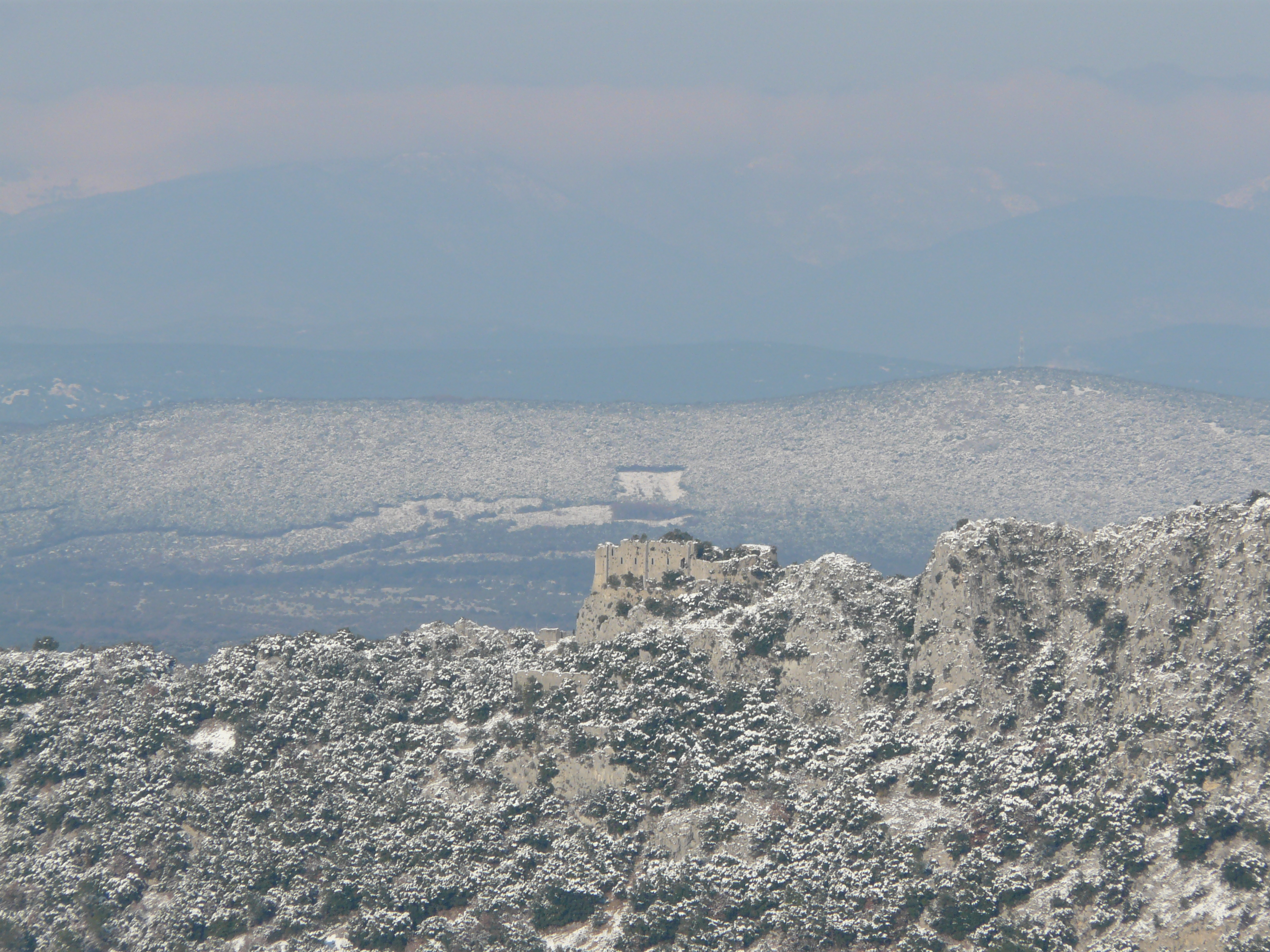
- Château de la Roquette

- Coat of arms
- Location of Rouet
- Location within France Location within Occitanie
- Coordinates: 43°48′46″N 3°48′50″E
- Country: France
- Region: Occitania
- Department: Hérault
- Arrondissement: Lodève
- Canton: Lodève

Government
  - Mayor (2020–2026): Myriam Sabatier
- Area^{1}: 24.77 km^{2} (9.56 sq mi)
- Elevation: 261 m (856 ft)
- Highest elevation: 500 m (1,600 ft)
- Lowest elevation: 179 m (587 ft)
- Population (2023): 71
  - Density: 2.9/km^{2} (7.4/sq mi)
- Time zone: UTC+01:00 (CET)
  - Summer (DST): UTC+02:00 (CEST)
- INSEE/Postal code: 34236 /34380
- ^{1} French Land Register data, which excludes lakes, ponds, glaciers > 1 km^{2} (0.386 sq mi or 247 acres) and river estuaries.

Rouet (Occitan: Lo Roet) is a commune in the Hérault department in the Occitanie region in southern France.

== Population ==
Historical population
Year	Pop.	±% p.a.
1968	46	—
1975	49	+0.91%
1982	53	+1.13%
1990	45	−2.02%
1999	46	+0.24%
2007	60	+3.38%
2012	52	−2.82%
2017	65	+4.56%
2023	71	+1.48%
Source: INSEE

== See also ==
- Communes of the Hérault department
