= Soumont =

- Commune
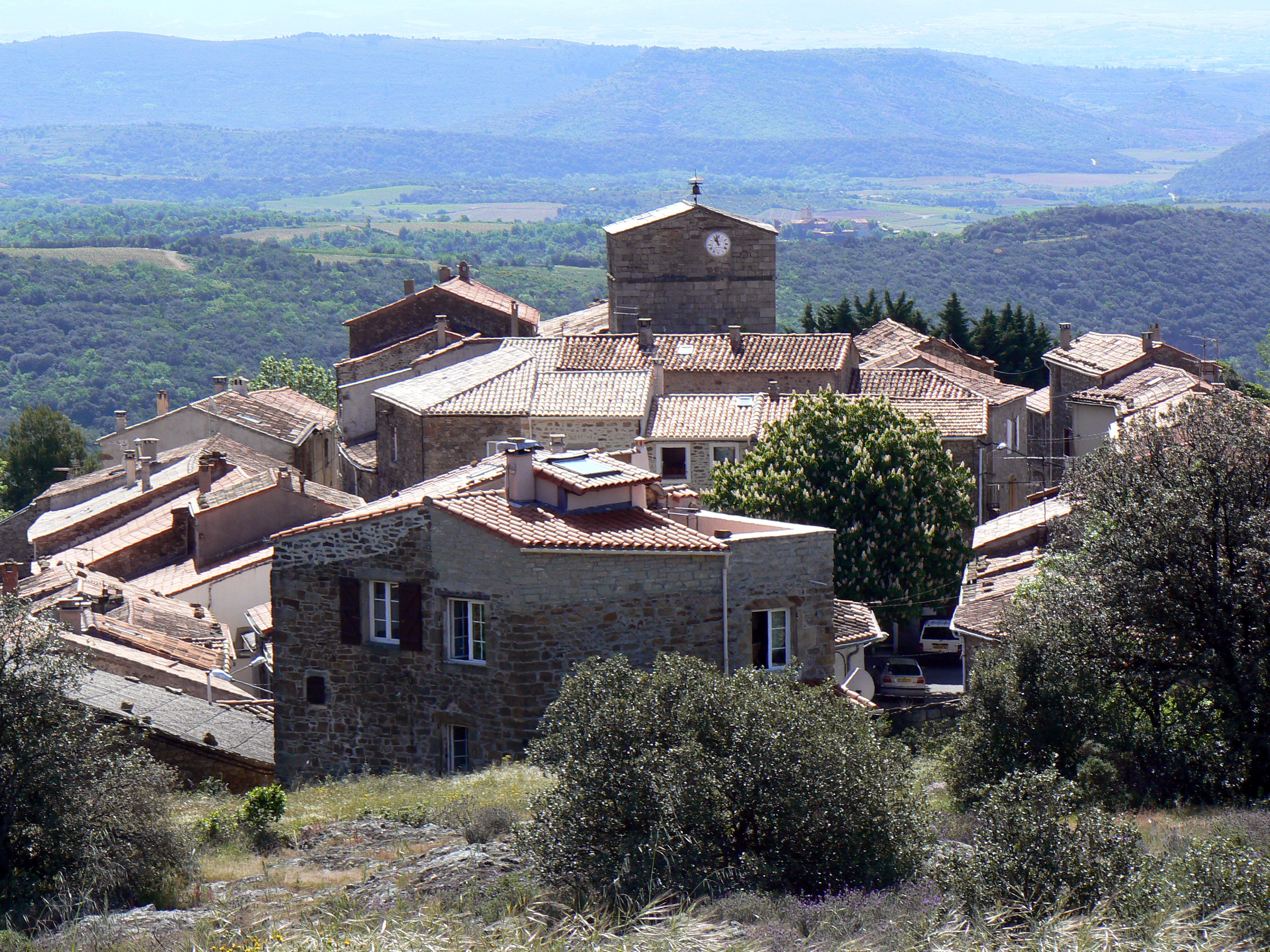
- A general view of Soumont
- Location of Soumont
- Location within France Location within Occitanie
- Coordinates: 43°43′43″N 3°21′18″E
- Country: France
- Region: Occitania
- Department: Hérault
- Arrondissement: Lodève
- Canton: Lodève
- Intercommunality: Lodévois - Larzac

Government
  - Mayor (2020–2026): Daniel Valette
- Area^{1}: 11.04 km^{2} (4.26 sq mi)
- Elevation: 410 m (1,350 ft)
- Highest elevation: 542 m (1,778 ft)
- Lowest elevation: 130 m (430 ft)
- Population (2023): 246
  - Density: 22.3/km^{2} (57.7/sq mi)
- Time zone: UTC+01:00 (CET)
  - Summer (DST): UTC+02:00 (CEST)
- INSEE/Postal code: 34306 /34700
- ^{1} French Land Register data, which excludes lakes, ponds, glaciers > 1 km^{2} (0.386 sq mi or 247 acres) and river estuaries.

Soumont (French pronunciation: [sumɔ̃]; Occitan: Somont) is a commune in the Hérault department in the Occitanie region in southern France.

== Geography ==
=== Climate ===
Soumont has a mediterranean climate (Köppen climate classification Csa). The average annual temperature in Soumont is 14.6 °C (58.3 °F). The average annual rainfall is 981.6 mm (38.65 in) with October as the wettest month. The temperatures are highest on average in July, at around 23.3 °C (73.9 °F), and lowest in January, at around 7.3 °C (45.1 °F). The highest temperature ever recorded in Soumont was 42.6 °C (108.7 °F) on 28 June 2019; the coldest temperature ever recorded was −8.0 °C (17.6 °F) on 5 February 2012.

Climate data for Soumont (1981–2010 averages, extremes 1991−present)
Month	Jan	Feb	Mar	Apr	May	Jun	Jul	Aug	Sep	Oct	Nov	Dec	Year
Record high °C (°F)	20.9 (69.6)	23.7 (74.7)	27.9 (82.2)	30.9 (87.6)	34.3 (93.7)	42.6 (108.7)	41.5 (106.7)	40.8 (105.4)	36.2 (97.2)	31.5 (88.7)	24.9 (76.8)	20.6 (69.1)	42.6 (108.7)
Mean daily maximum °C (°F)	10.4 (50.7)	11.4 (52.5)	14.9 (58.8)	17.3 (63.1)	21.7 (71.1)	26.0 (78.8)	29.0 (84.2)	28.8 (83.8)	23.7 (74.7)	18.9 (66.0)	13.7 (56.7)	10.6 (51.1)	18.9 (66.0)
Daily mean °C (°F)	7.3 (45.1)	7.8 (46.0)	10.6 (51.1)	12.8 (55.0)	16.9 (62.4)	20.7 (69.3)	23.3 (73.9)	23.3 (73.9)	18.9 (66.0)	15.4 (59.7)	10.5 (50.9)	7.7 (45.9)	14.6 (58.3)
Mean daily minimum °C (°F)	4.2 (39.6)	4.2 (39.6)	6.4 (43.5)	8.4 (47.1)	12.1 (53.8)	15.4 (59.7)	17.7 (63.9)	17.8 (64.0)	14.2 (57.6)	11.9 (53.4)	7.3 (45.1)	4.7 (40.5)	10.4 (50.7)
Record low °C (°F)	−6.6 (20.1)	−8.0 (17.6)	−6.2 (20.8)	−0.2 (31.6)	3.7 (38.7)	7.8 (46.0)	10.9 (51.6)	11.9 (53.4)	6.8 (44.2)	−3.0 (26.6)	−4.6 (23.7)	−6.5 (20.3)	−8.0 (17.6)
Average precipitation mm (inches)	103.1 (4.06)	66.4 (2.61)	52.2 (2.06)	90.1 (3.55)	76.7 (3.02)	48.9 (1.93)	29.8 (1.17)	40.7 (1.60)	102.4 (4.03)	142.8 (5.62)	103.4 (4.07)	125.1 (4.93)	981.6 (38.65)
Average precipitation days (≥ 1.0 mm)	8.4	6.2	5.8	8.0	8.0	5.0	3.7	4.9	6.1	9.4	7.7	7.7	80.7
Source: Meteociel

== Population ==
Historical population
Year	Pop.	±% p.a.
1968	144	—
1975	164	+1.88%
1982	130	−3.26%
1990	126	−0.39%
1999	134	+0.69%
2007	115	−1.89%
2012	188	+10.33%
2017	184	−0.43%
2023	246	+4.96%
Source: INSEE

== See also ==
- Communes of the Hérault department
