= Sauteyrargues =

- Commune
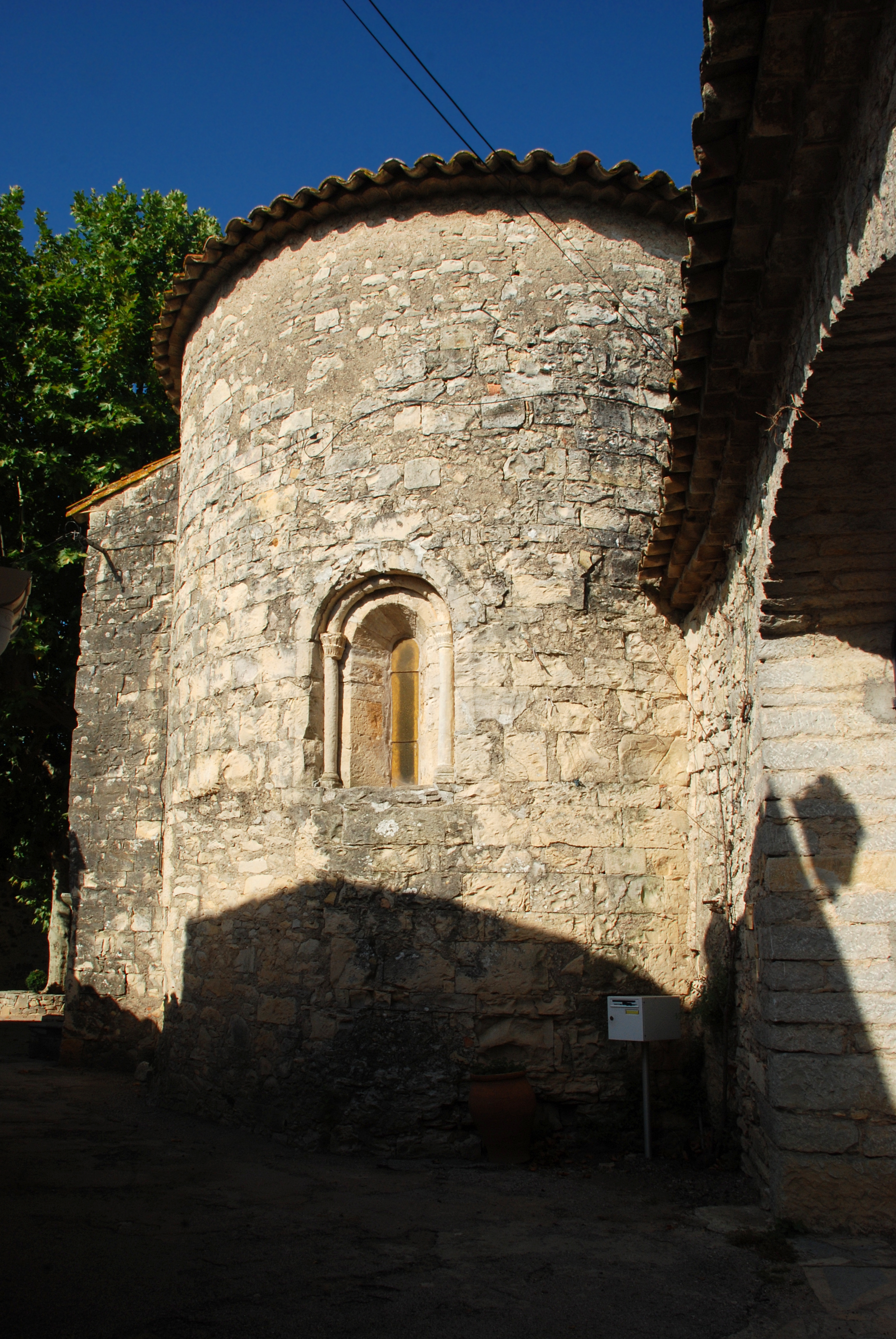
- The church of Sauteyrargues

- Coat of arms
- Location of Sauteyrargues
- Location within France Location within Occitanie
- Coordinates: 43°50′23″N 3°55′11″E
- Country: France
- Region: Occitania
- Department: Hérault
- Arrondissement: Lodève
- Canton: Lodève

Government
  - Mayor (2020–2026): Gilles Berger
- Area^{1}: 12.76 km^{2} (4.93 sq mi)
- Elevation: 70 m (230 ft)
- Highest elevation: 290 m (950 ft)
- Lowest elevation: 104 m (341 ft)
- Population (2023): 441
  - Density: 34.6/km^{2} (89.5/sq mi)
- Time zone: UTC+01:00 (CET)
  - Summer (DST): UTC+02:00 (CEST)
- INSEE/Postal code: 34297 /34270
- ^{1} French Land Register data, which excludes lakes, ponds, glaciers > 1 km^{2} (0.386 sq mi or 247 acres) and river estuaries.

Sauteyrargues (French pronunciation: [soteʁaʁɡ]; Occitan: Sautairargues) is a commune in the Hérault department in the Occitanie region in southern France.

== Population ==
Historical population
Year	Pop.	±% p.a.
1968	87	—
1975	86	−0.17%
1982	133	+6.43%
1990	187	+4.35%
1999	300	+5.39%
2007	319	+0.77%
2012	380	+3.56%
2017	410	+1.53%
2023	441	+1.22%
Source: INSEE

== See also ==
- Communes of the Hérault department
