= Laroque, Hérault =

Laroque
- Commune
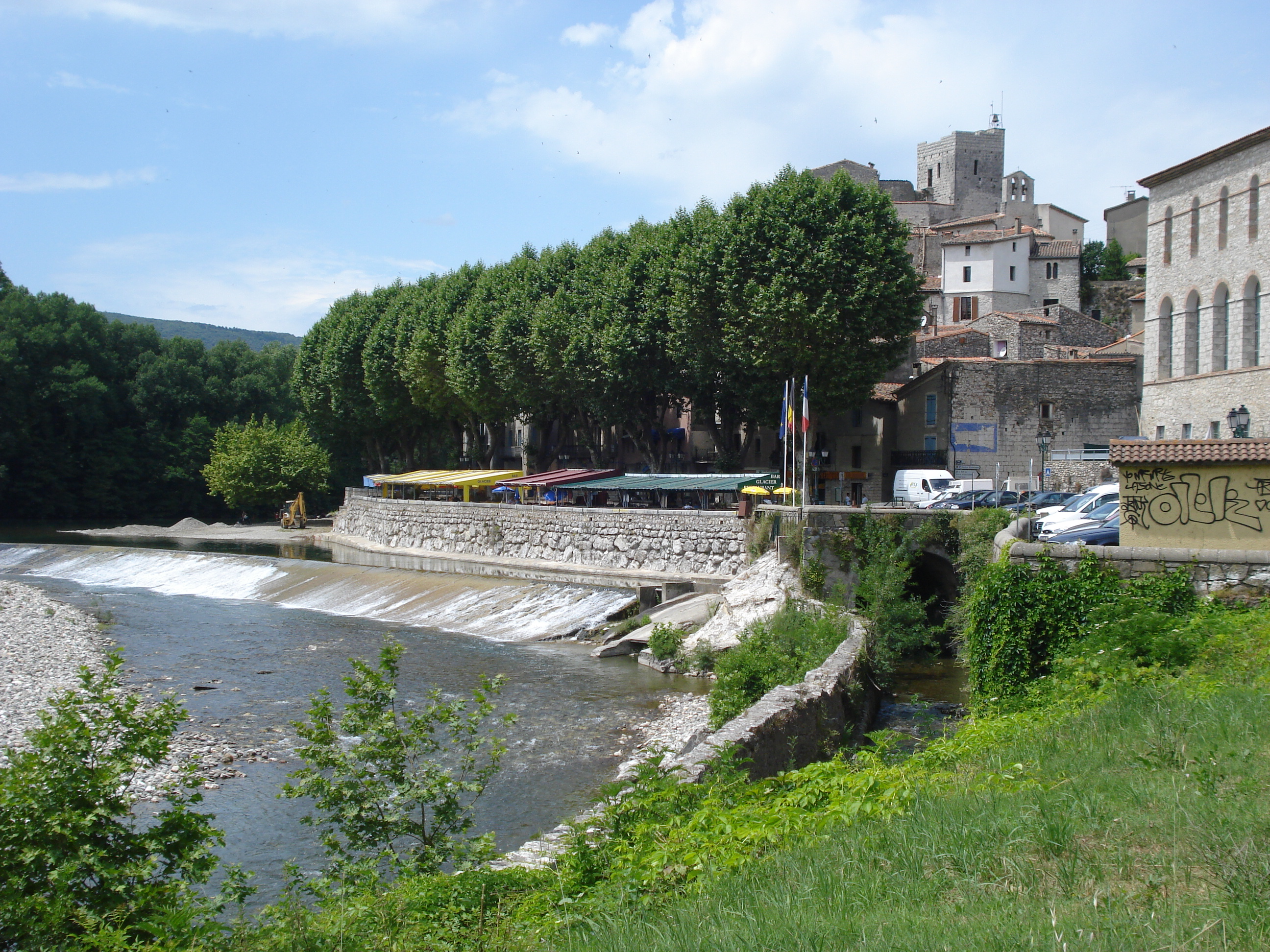
- Laroque

- Coat of arms
- Location of Laroque
- Location within France Location within Occitanie
- Coordinates: 43°55′25″N 3°43′31″E
- Country: France
- Region: Occitania
- Department: Hérault
- Arrondissement: Lodève
- Canton: Lodève
- Intercommunality: Cévennes Gangeoises et Suménoises

Government
  - Mayor (2020–2026): Pierrick Ciribino
- Area^{1}: 6.63 km^{2} (2.56 sq mi)
- Elevation: 132 m (433 ft)
- Highest elevation: 490 m (1,610 ft)
- Lowest elevation: 124 m (407 ft)
- Population (2023): 1,668
  - Density: 252/km^{2} (652/sq mi)
- Time zone: UTC+01:00 (CET)
  - Summer (DST): UTC+02:00 (CEST)
- INSEE/Postal code: 34128 /34190
- ^{1} French Land Register data, which excludes lakes, ponds, glaciers > 1 km^{2} (0.386 sq mi or 247 acres) and river estuaries.

Laroque (French pronunciation: [laʁɔk]; Occitan: La Ròca) is a commune in the Hérault département in the Occitanie region in southern France.

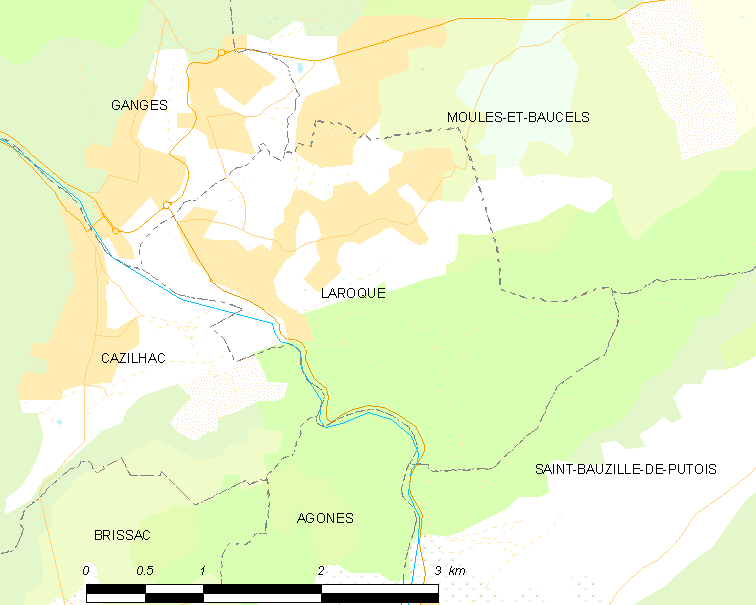
Map

== Population ==
Historical population
Year	Pop.	±% p.a.
1968	535	—
1975	649	+2.80%
1982	794	+2.92%
1990	1,028	+3.28%
1999	1,126	+1.02%
2007	1,377	+2.55%
2012	1,543	+2.30%
2017	1,624	+1.03%
2023	1,668	+0.45%
Source: INSEE

== See also ==
- Communes of the Hérault department
