= Fontanès, Hérault =

Fontanès
- Commune
- Coat of arms
- Location of Fontanès
- Location within France Location within Occitanie
- Coordinates: 43°47′43″N 3°54′54″E
- Country: France
- Region: Occitania
- Department: Hérault
- Arrondissement: Lodève
- Canton: Lodève
- Intercommunality: Grand Pic Saint-Loup

Government
  - Mayor (2020–2026): Geneviève Castanié
- Area^{1}: 8.18 km^{2} (3.16 sq mi)
- Elevation: 80 m (260 ft)
- Highest elevation: 241 m (791 ft)
- Lowest elevation: 88 m (289 ft)
- Population (2023): 358
  - Density: 43.8/km^{2} (113/sq mi)
- Time zone: UTC+01:00 (CET)
  - Summer (DST): UTC+02:00 (CEST)
- INSEE/Postal code: 34102 /34270
- ^{1} French Land Register data, which excludes lakes, ponds, glaciers > 1 km^{2} (0.386 sq mi or 247 acres) and river estuaries.

Fontanès (French pronunciation: [fɔ̃tanɛs]; Occitan: Fontanés) is a commune in the Hérault department in southern France.

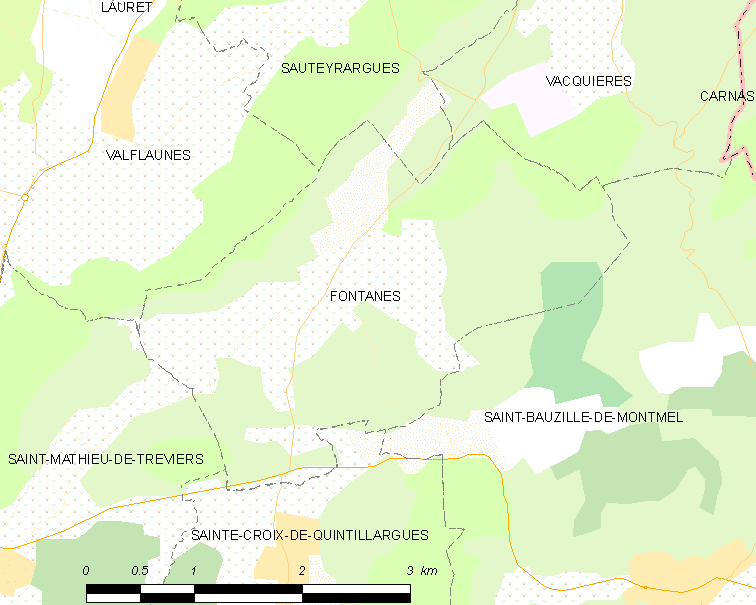
Map

== Population ==
Historical population
Year	Pop.	±% p.a.
1968	107	—
1975	72	−5.50%
1982	144	+10.41%
1990	187	+3.32%
1999	202	+0.86%
2007	239	+2.12%
2012	329	+6.60%
2017	348	+1.13%
2023	358	+0.47%
Source: INSEE

== See also ==
- Communes of the Hérault department
