= Le Cros =

- Commune
- Location of Le Cros
- Location within France Location within Occitanie
- Coordinates: 43°52′10″N 3°21′55″E
- Country: France
- Region: Occitania
- Department: Hérault
- Arrondissement: Lodève
- Canton: Lodève
- Intercommunality: Lodévois - Larzac

Government
  - Mayor (2020–2026): Alain Viala
- Area^{1}: 22.45 km^{2} (8.67 sq mi)
- Elevation: 760 m (2,490 ft)
- Highest elevation: 865 m (2,838 ft)
- Lowest elevation: 596 m (1,955 ft)
- Population (2023): 60
  - Density: 2.7/km^{2} (6.9/sq mi)
- Time zone: UTC+01:00 (CET)
  - Summer (DST): UTC+02:00 (CEST)
- INSEE/Postal code: 34091 /34520
- ^{1} French Land Register data, which excludes lakes, ponds, glaciers > 1 km^{2} (0.386 sq mi or 247 acres) and river estuaries.

Le Cros is a commune in the Hérault department in southern France.

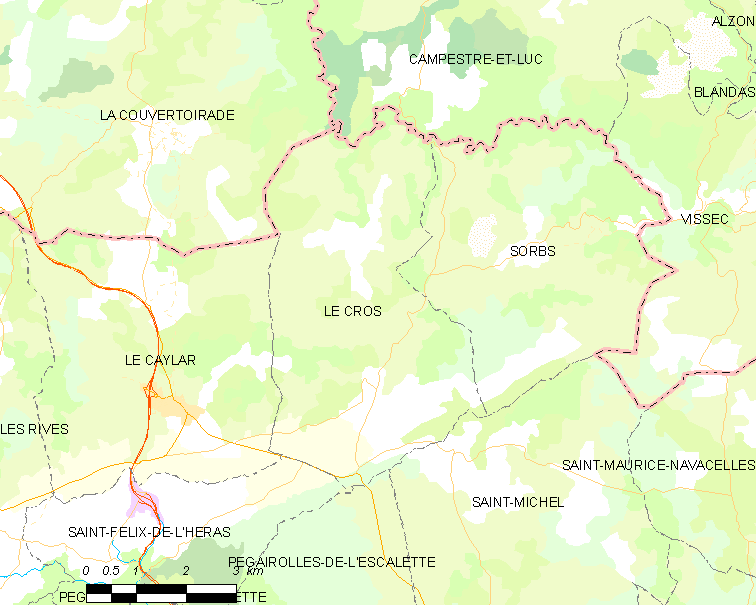
Map

== Population ==
Historical population
| Year | Pop. | ±% p.a. |
|---|---|---|
| 1968 | 49 | — |
| 1975 | 38 | −3.57% |
| 1982 | 34 | −1.58% |
| 1990 | 32 | −0.75% |
| 1999 | 38 | +1.93% |
| 2007 | 39 | +0.33% |
| 2012 | 49 | +4.67% |
| 2017 | 55 | +2.34% |
| 2023 | 60 | +1.46% |
Source: INSEE

== See also ==
- Communes of the Hérault department
