= Saint-André-de-Buèges =

- Commune
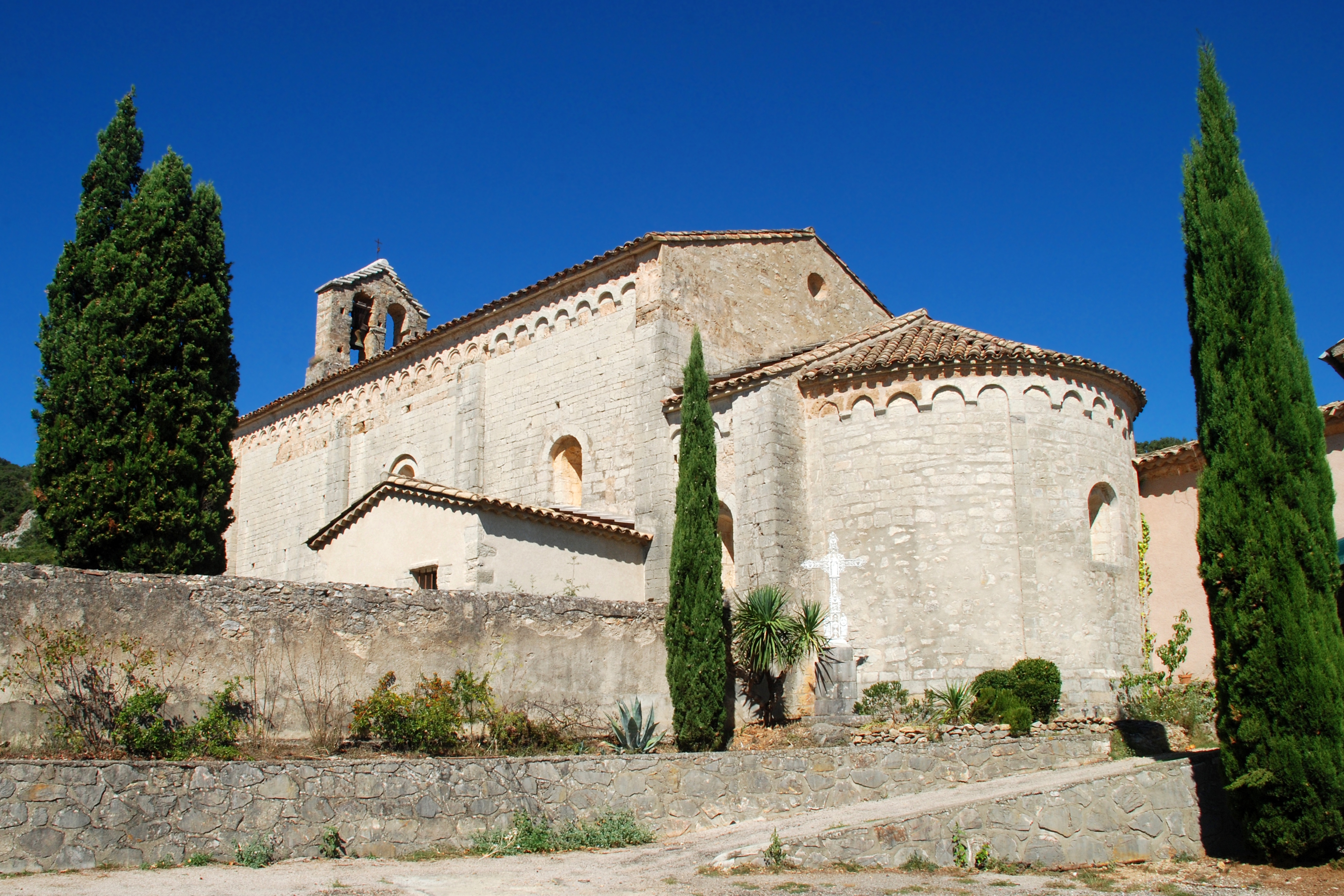
- The church of Saint-André-de-Buèges

- Coat of arms
- Location of Saint-André-de-Buèges
- Location within France Location within Occitanie
- Coordinates: 43°50′58″N 3°39′50″E
- Country: France
- Region: Occitania
- Department: Hérault
- Arrondissement: Lodève
- Canton: Lodève

Government
  - Mayor (2020–2026): René Albe
- Area^{1}: 15.26 km^{2} (5.89 sq mi)
- Elevation: 130 m (430 ft)
- Highest elevation: 940 m (3,080 ft)
- Lowest elevation: 119 m (390 ft)
- Population (2023): 47
  - Density: 3.1/km^{2} (8.0/sq mi)
- Time zone: UTC+01:00 (CET)
  - Summer (DST): UTC+02:00 (CEST)
- INSEE/Postal code: 34238 /34190
- ^{1} French Land Register data, which excludes lakes, ponds, glaciers > 1 km^{2} (0.386 sq mi or 247 acres) and river estuaries.

Saint-André-de-Buèges (French pronunciation: [sɛ̃.t‿ɑ̃dʁe də bɥɛʒ]; Occitan: Sant Andrieu de Buòja) is a commune in the Hérault department in the Occitanie region in southern France.

== Population ==
Historical population
Year	Pop.	±% p.a.
1968	60	—
1975	50	−2.57%
1982	52	+0.56%
1990	54	+0.47%
1999	58	+0.80%
2007	52	−1.36%
2012	59	+2.56%
2017	39	−7.95%
2023	47	+3.16%
Source: INSEE

== See also ==
- Communes of the Hérault department
