= Ferrières-les-Verreries =

- Commune
- Coat of arms
- Location of Ferrières-les-Verreries
- Location within France Location within Occitanie
- Coordinates: 43°52′44″N 3°47′52″E
- Country: France
- Region: Occitania
- Department: Hérault
- Arrondissement: Lodève
- Canton: Lodève

Government
  - Mayor (2020–2026): Christian Bourriague
- Area^{1}: 17.42 km^{2} (6.73 sq mi)
- Elevation: 320 m (1,050 ft)
- Highest elevation: 421 m (1,381 ft)
- Lowest elevation: 206 m (676 ft)
- Population (2023): 47
  - Density: 2.7/km^{2} (7.0/sq mi)
- Time zone: UTC+01:00 (CET)
  - Summer (DST): UTC+02:00 (CEST)
- INSEE/Postal code: 34099 /34190
- ^{1} French Land Register data, which excludes lakes, ponds, glaciers > 1 km^{2} (0.386 sq mi or 247 acres) and river estuaries.

Ferrières-les-Verreries (French pronunciation: [fɛʁjɛʁ le vɛʁ.ʁi]; Occitan: Ferrièiras de las Veirièiras) is a commune in the Hérault department in southern France.

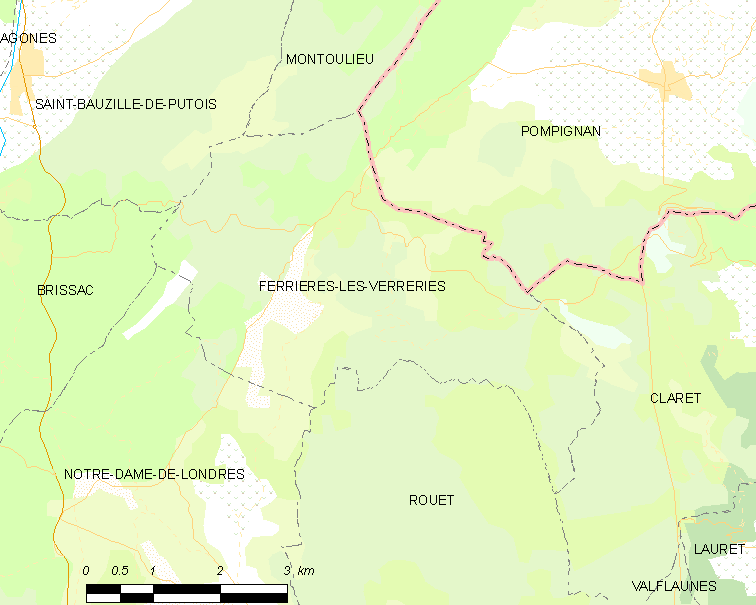
Map

== Population ==
Historical population
Year	Pop.	±% p.a.
1968	11	—
1975	14	+3.51%
1982	26	+9.25%
1990	23	−1.52%
1999	38	+5.74%
2007	60	+5.88%
2012	75	+4.56%
2017	50	−7.79%
2023	47	−1.03%
Source: INSEE

== See also ==
- Communes of the Hérault department
