= Notre-Dame-de-Londres =

- Commune
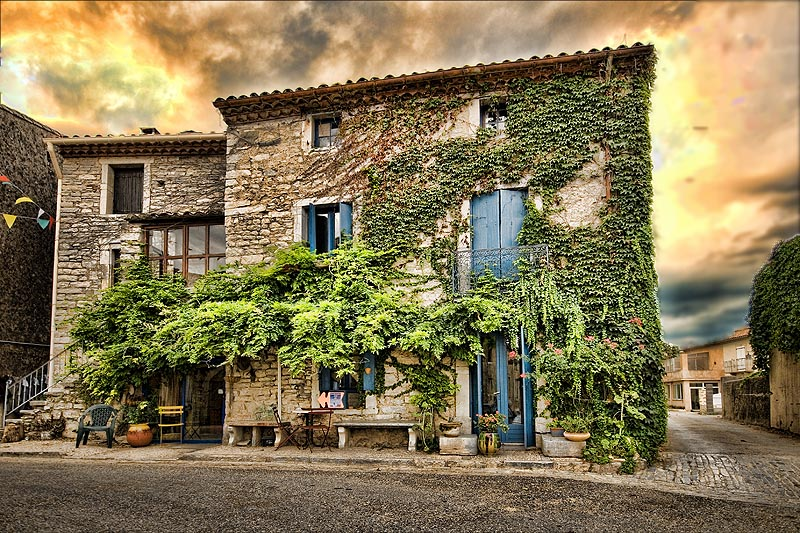
- A roadside cottage

- Coat of arms
- Location of Notre-Dame-de-Londres
- Location within France Location within Occitanie
- Coordinates: 43°49′40″N 3°46′40″E
- Country: France
- Region: Occitania
- Department: Hérault
- Arrondissement: Lodève
- Canton: Lodève

Government
  - Mayor (2020–2026): Romain Kusosky
- Area^{1}: 28.15 km^{2} (10.87 sq mi)
- Elevation: 402 m (1,319 ft)
- Highest elevation: 426 m (1,398 ft)
- Lowest elevation: 126 m (413 ft)
- Population (2023): 520
  - Density: 18/km^{2} (48/sq mi)
- Time zone: UTC+01:00 (CET)
  - Summer (DST): UTC+02:00 (CEST)
- INSEE/Postal code: 34185 /34380
- ^{1} French Land Register data, which excludes lakes, ponds, glaciers > 1 km^{2} (0.386 sq mi or 247 acres) and river estuaries.

Notre-Dame-de-Londres (French pronunciation: [nɔtʁə dam də lɔ̃dʁ]; Occitan: Nostre Dama de Londras) is a commune in the Hérault department in the Occitanie region in southern France.

== Population ==
Historical population
Year	Pop.	±% p.a.
1968	235	—
1975	193	−2.77%
1982	205	+0.87%
1990	313	+5.43%
1999	398	+2.71%
2007	496	+2.79%
2012	477	−0.78%
2017	480	+0.13%
2023	520	+1.34%
Source: INSEE

== See also ==
- Communes of the Hérault department
