= Usclas-du-Bosc =

- Commune
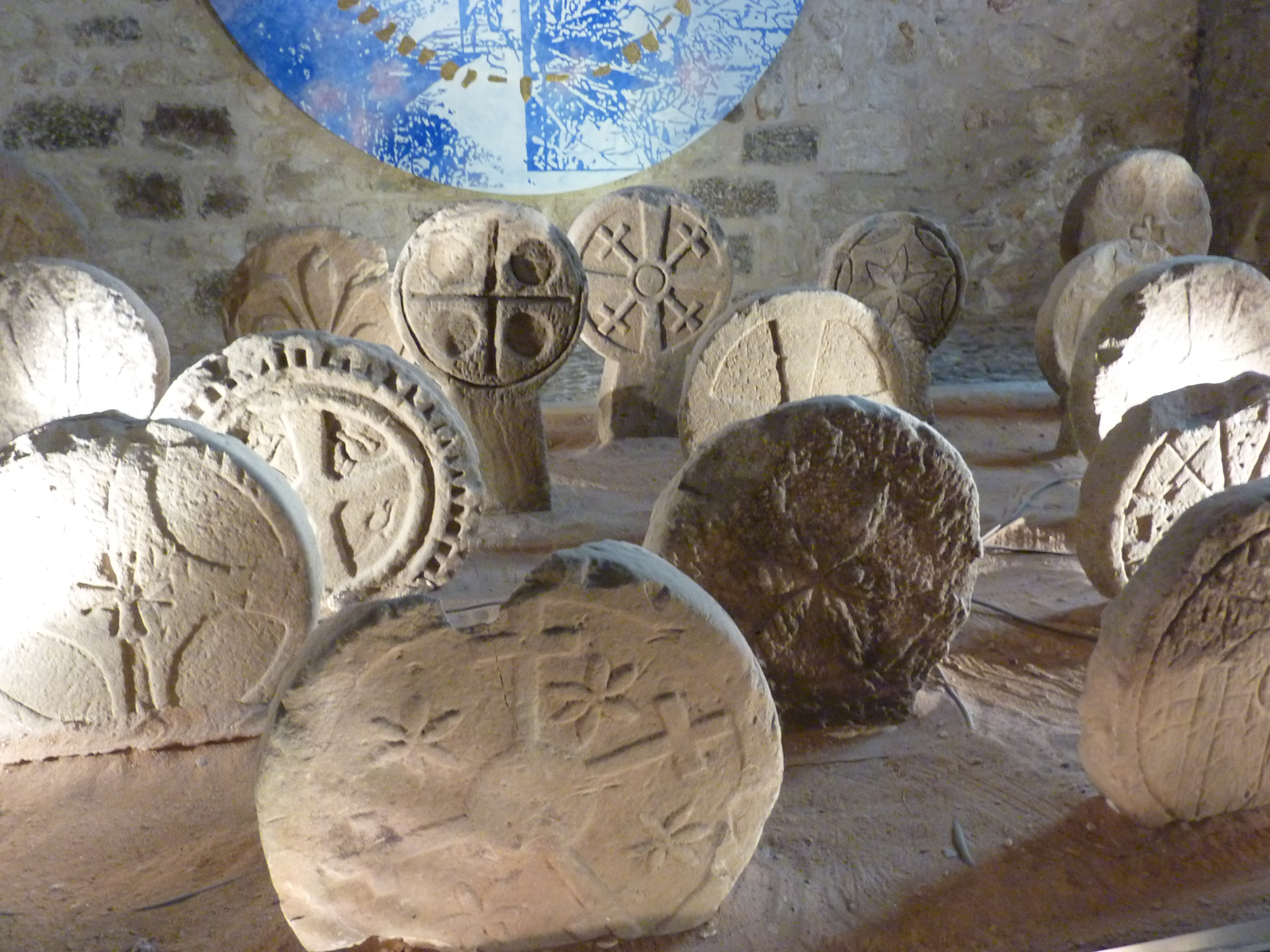
- Disc-shaped steles of Usclas-du-Bosc, at the Museum of Lodève

- Coat of arms
- Location of Usclas-du-Bosc
- Location within France Location within Occitanie
- Coordinates: 43°43′26″N 3°24′12″E
- Country: France
- Region: Occitania
- Department: Hérault
- Arrondissement: Lodève
- Canton: Lodève
- Intercommunality: Lodévois et Larzac

Government
  - Mayor (2020–2026): Caroline Desmaretz
- Area^{1}: 4.51 km^{2} (1.74 sq mi)
- Elevation: 200 m (660 ft)
- Highest elevation: 445 m (1,460 ft)
- Lowest elevation: 160 m (520 ft)
- Population (2023): 250
  - Density: 55/km^{2} (140/sq mi)
- Time zone: UTC+01:00 (CET)
  - Summer (DST): UTC+02:00 (CEST)
- INSEE/Postal code: 34316 /34700
- ^{1} French Land Register data, which excludes lakes, ponds, glaciers > 1 km^{2} (0.386 sq mi or 247 acres) and river estuaries.

Usclas-du-Bosc (French pronunciation: [ysklas dy bɔsk]; Occitan: Usclats del Bòsc) is a commune in the Hérault department in the Occitanie region in southern France.

== Population ==
Historical population
Year	Pop.	±% p.a.
1968	75	—
1975	59	−3.37%
1982	69	+2.26%
1990	57	−2.36%
1999	67	+1.81%
2007	110	+6.39%
2012	146	+5.83%
2017	218	+8.35%
2023	250	+2.31%
Source: INSEE

== See also ==
- Communes of the Hérault department
