= Lavalette, Hérault =

Lavalette
- Commune
- Location of Lavalette
- Location within France Location within Occitanie
- Coordinates: 43°41′29″N 3°16′21″E
- Country: France
- Region: Occitania
- Department: Hérault
- Arrondissement: Lodève
- Canton: Lodève
- Intercommunality: Lodévois et Larzac

Government
  - Mayor (2020–2026): Claire Van Der Horst
- Area^{1}: 8.54 km^{2} (3.30 sq mi)
- Elevation: 180 m (590 ft)
- Highest elevation: 685 m (2,247 ft)
- Lowest elevation: 201 m (659 ft)
- Population (2023): 53
  - Density: 6.2/km^{2} (16/sq mi)
- Time zone: UTC+01:00 (CET)
  - Summer (DST): UTC+02:00 (CEST)
- INSEE/Postal code: 34133 /34700
- ^{1} French Land Register data, which excludes lakes, ponds, glaciers > 1 km^{2} (0.386 sq mi or 247 acres) and river estuaries.

Lavalette (French pronunciation: [lavalɛt]; Occitan: La Valeta) is a commune in the Hérault département in the Occitanie region in southern France.

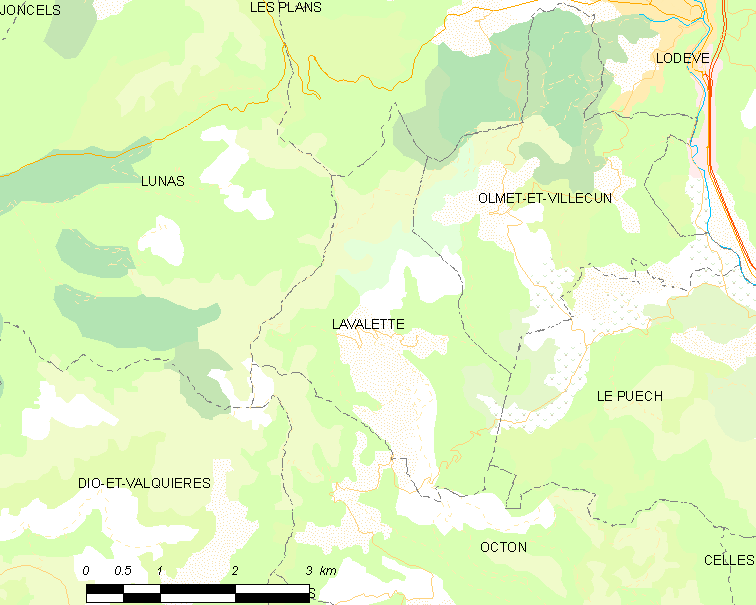
Map

== Population ==
Historical population
Year	Pop.	±% p.a.
1968	24	—
1975	18	−4.03%
1982	40	+12.08%
1990	34	−2.01%
1999	37	+0.94%
2007	46	+2.76%
2012	61	+5.81%
2017	62	+0.33%
2023	53	−2.58%
Source: INSEE

== See also ==
- Communes of the Hérault department
