= Olmet-et-Villecun =

- Commune
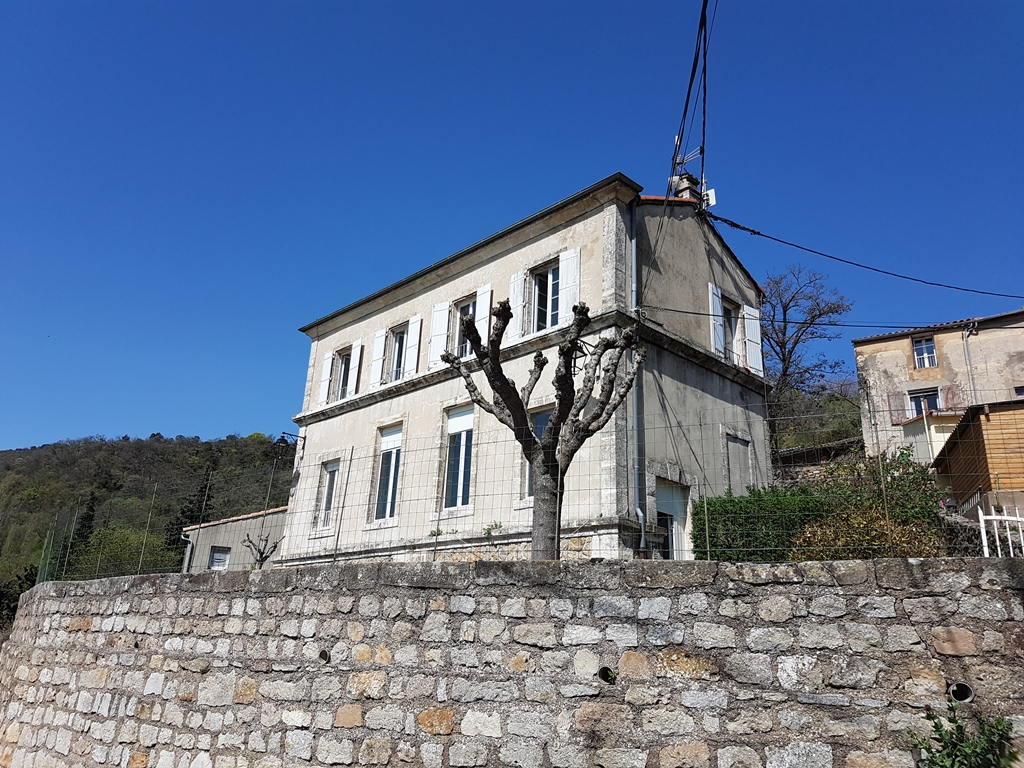
- Town hall

- Coat of arms
- Location of Olmet-et-Villecun
- Location within France Location within Occitanie
- Coordinates: 43°42′29″N 3°17′22″E
- Country: France
- Region: Occitania
- Department: Hérault
- Arrondissement: Lodève
- Canton: Lodève
- Intercommunality: Lodévois - Larzac

Government
  - Mayor (2020–2026): Christophe Romo
- Area^{1}: 9.55 km^{2} (3.69 sq mi)
- Elevation: 300 m (980 ft)
- Highest elevation: 600 m (2,000 ft)
- Lowest elevation: 120 m (390 ft)
- Population (2023): 163
  - Density: 17.1/km^{2} (44.2/sq mi)
- Time zone: UTC+01:00 (CET)
  - Summer (DST): UTC+02:00 (CEST)
- INSEE/Postal code: 34188 /34700
- ^{1} French Land Register data, which excludes lakes, ponds, glaciers > 1 km^{2} (0.386 sq mi or 247 acres) and river estuaries.

Olmet-et-Villecun (French pronunciation: [ɔlmɛ e vilkœ̃]; Occitan: Alaumet e Vilacun) is a commune in the Hérault department in the Occitanie region in southern France.

== Population ==
Historical population
Year	Pop.	±% p.a.
1968	62	—
1975	68	+1.33%
1982	73	+1.02%
1990	92	+2.93%
1999	114	+2.41%
2007	146	+3.14%
2012	144	−0.28%
2017	180	+4.56%
2023	163	−1.64%
Source: INSEE

== See also ==
- Communes of the Hérault department
