= Canton of Lodève =

Coordinates: 43.73°N 3.32°E

Lodève
- Canton
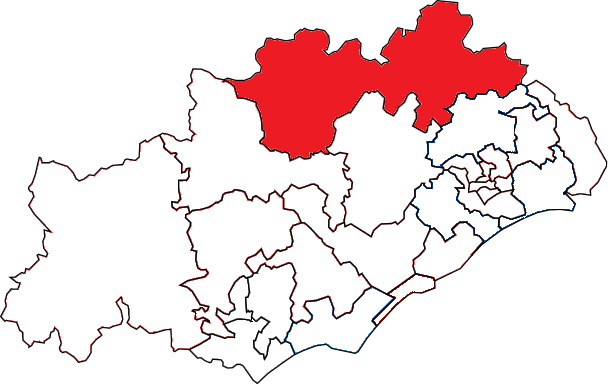
- Interactive map of Lodève
- Country: France
- Region: Occitania
- Department: Hérault
- No. of communes: {{{nbcomm}}}

Government
  - Representatives (2021–2028): Jacques Rigaud; Gaëlle Lévêque
- Area: 1,055.31 km^{2} (407.46 sq mi)
- Population (2023): 36,761
  - Density: 34.834/km^{2} (90.220/sq mi)
- INSEE code: 34 11

The canton of Lodève is an administrative division of the Hérault department, southern France. Its borders were modified at the French canton reorganisation which came into effect in March 2015. Its seat is in Lodève.

== Composition ==
It consists of the following communes:

1. Agonès
2. Le Bosc
3. Brissac
4. Causse-de-la-Selle
5. Le Caylar
6. Cazilhac
7. Celles
8. Claret
9. Le Cros
10. Ferrières-les-Verreries
11. Fontanès
12. Fozières
13. Ganges
14. Gorniès
15. Laroque
16. Lauret
17. Lauroux
18. Lavalette
19. Lodève
20. Mas-de-Londres
21. Montoulieu
22. Moulès-et-Baucels
23. Notre-Dame-de-Londres
24. Olmet-et-Villecun
25. Pégairolles-de-Buèges
26. Pégairolles-de-l'Escalette
27. Les Plans
28. Poujols
29. Le Puech
30. Les Rives
31. Romiguières
32. Roqueredonde
33. Rouet
34. Saint-André-de-Buèges
35. Saint-Bauzille-de-Putois
36. Saint-Étienne-de-Gourgas
37. Saint-Félix-de-l'Héras
38. Saint-Jean-de-Buèges
39. Saint-Jean-de-la-Blaquière
40. Saint-Martin-de-Londres
41. Saint-Maurice-Navacelles
42. Saint-Michel
43. Saint-Pierre-de-la-Fage
44. Saint-Privat
45. Sauteyrargues
46. Sorbs
47. Soubès
48. Soumont
49. Usclas-du-Bosc
50. La Vacquerie-et-Saint-Martin-de-Castries
51. Vacquières
52. Valflaunès
53. Viols-en-Laval
54. Viols-le-Fort

== Councillors ==
Election	Councillors	Party	Occupation
2015	Marie-Christine Bousquet	PS	Mayor of Lodève
2015	Jacques Rigaud	PS	Councillor of Ganges
2017	Irène Tolleret	LREM	Mayor of Fontanès
2019	Gaëlle Lévêque	PS	Councillor of Lodève

- Following the death of Marie-Christine Bousquet, his substitute, Irène Tolleret, replaces her in Departmental council of Hérault.
- Following Irène Tolleret's election as a Member of the European Parliament in 2019, a cantonal by-election is organized. Gaëlle Lévêque is elected with 70.85% of the votes.

== Pictures of the canton ==
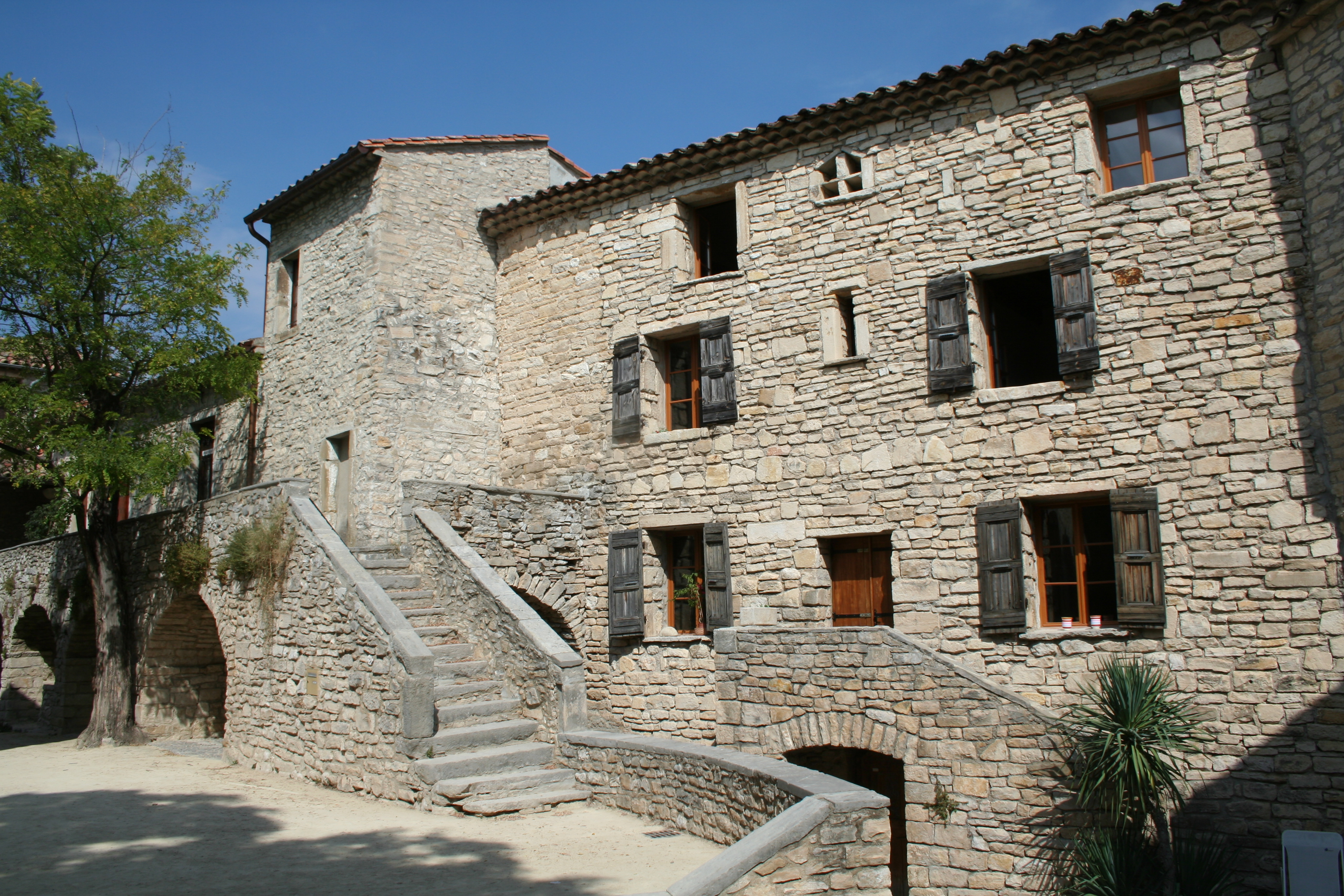
Houses in Saint-Martin-de-Londres

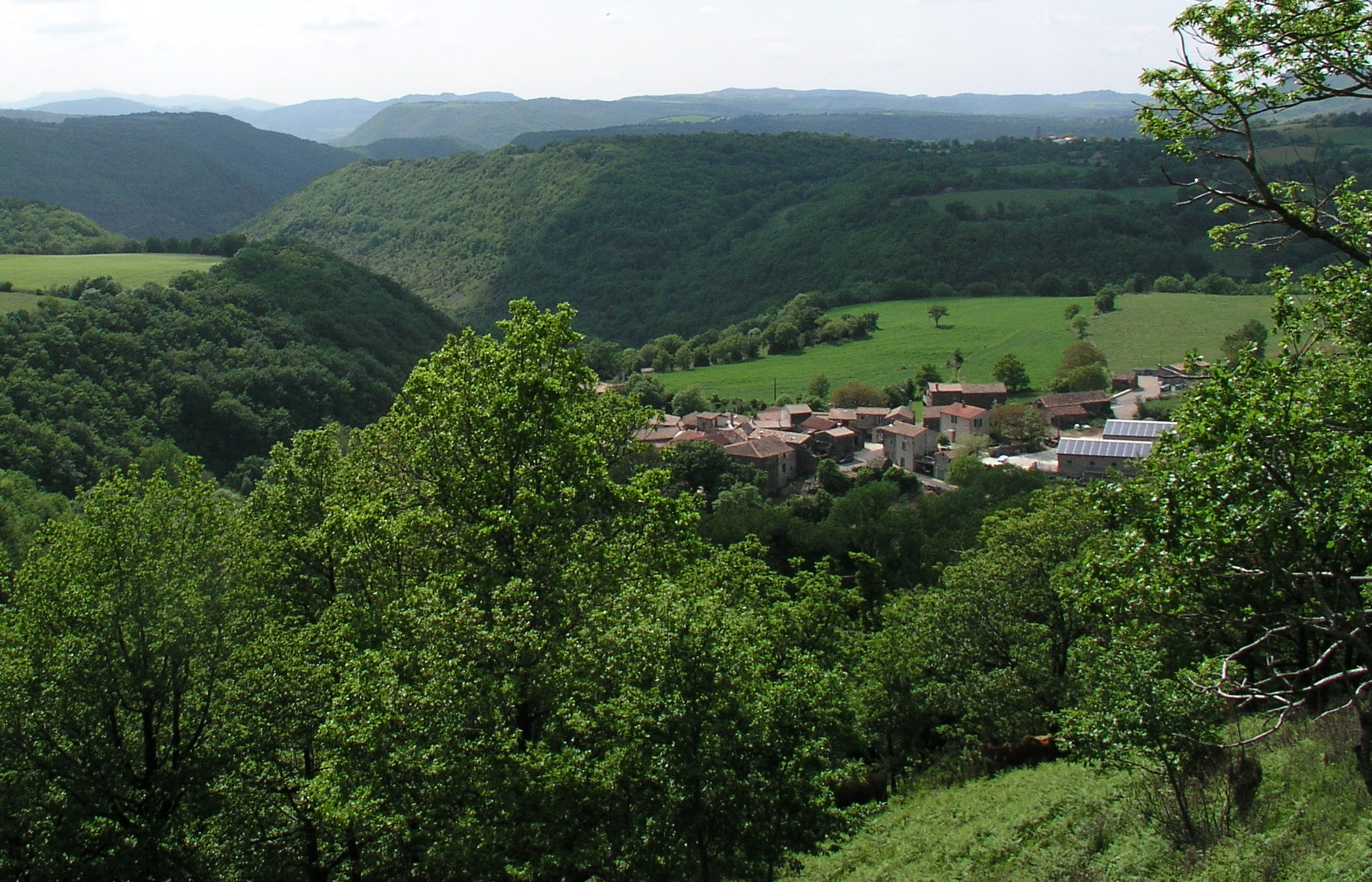
View of Romiguières

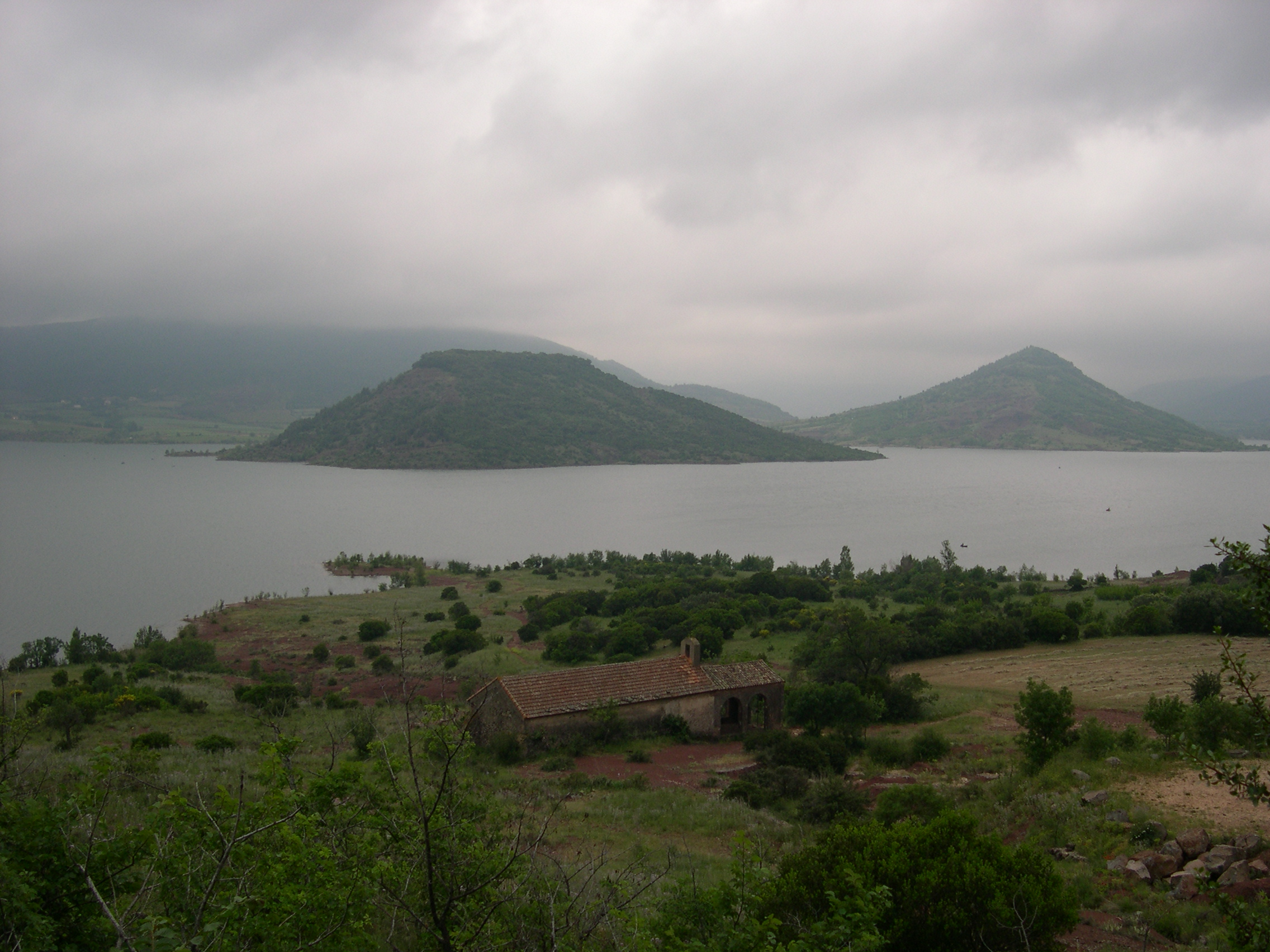
View of the "Lac du Salagou" in Celles
