= Les Plans, Hérault =

Les Plans
- Commune
- Location of Les Plans
- Location within France Location within Occitanie
- Coordinates: 43°45′15″N 3°16′37″E
- Country: France
- Region: Occitania
- Department: Hérault
- Arrondissement: Lodève
- Canton: Lodève
- Intercommunality: Lodévois et Larzac

Government
  - Mayor (2020–2026): Daniel Fabre
- Area^{1}: 18.12 km^{2} (7.00 sq mi)
- Elevation: 300 m (980 ft)
- Highest elevation: 845 m (2,772 ft)
- Lowest elevation: 186 m (610 ft)
- Population (2023): 315
  - Density: 17.4/km^{2} (45.0/sq mi)
- Time zone: UTC+01:00 (CET)
  - Summer (DST): UTC+02:00 (CEST)
- INSEE/Postal code: 34205 /34700
- ^{1} French Land Register data, which excludes lakes, ponds, glaciers > 1 km^{2} (0.386 sq mi or 247 acres) and river estuaries.

Les Plans (French pronunciation: [le plɑ̃]; Occitan: Los Plans) is a commune in the Hérault department in the Occitanie region in southern France.

== Geography ==
=== Climate ===
Les Plans has a warm-summer mediterranean climate (Köppen climate classification Csb). The average annual temperature in Les Plans is 10.3 °C (50.5 °F). The average annual rainfall is 1,611.3 mm (63.44 in) with October as the wettest month. The temperatures are highest on average in July, at around 19.1 °C (66.4 °F), and lowest in January, at around 2.8 °C (37.0 °F). The highest temperature ever recorded in Les Plans was 37.6 °C (99.7 °F) on 12 August 2003; the coldest temperature ever recorded was −14.6 °C (5.7 °F) on 8 February 2012.

Climate data for Les Plans (1981–2010 averages, extremes 1994−present)
Month	Jan	Feb	Mar	Apr	May	Jun	Jul	Aug	Sep	Oct	Nov	Dec	Year
Record high °C (°F)	18.1 (64.6)	20.6 (69.1)	22.1 (71.8)	25.0 (77.0)	28.3 (82.9)	34.4 (93.9)	33.1 (91.6)	37.6 (99.7)	29.2 (84.6)	26.0 (78.8)	22.2 (72.0)	18.3 (64.9)	37.6 (99.7)
Mean daily maximum °C (°F)	5.2 (41.4)	6.3 (43.3)	9.7 (49.5)	12.6 (54.7)	16.3 (61.3)	20.9 (69.6)	23.9 (75.0)	23.5 (74.3)	18.7 (65.7)	14.1 (57.4)	8.6 (47.5)	5.8 (42.4)	13.8 (56.8)
Daily mean °C (°F)	2.8 (37.0)	3.4 (38.1)	6.0 (42.8)	8.7 (47.7)	12.4 (54.3)	16.5 (61.7)	19.1 (66.4)	18.9 (66.0)	14.8 (58.6)	11.3 (52.3)	6.0 (42.8)	3.3 (37.9)	10.3 (50.5)
Mean daily minimum °C (°F)	0.4 (32.7)	0.4 (32.7)	2.4 (36.3)	4.7 (40.5)	8.6 (47.5)	12.1 (53.8)	14.2 (57.6)	14.3 (57.7)	10.9 (51.6)	8.4 (47.1)	3.4 (38.1)	0.8 (33.4)	6.8 (44.2)
Record low °C (°F)	−10.3 (13.5)	−14.6 (5.7)	−11.3 (11.7)	−4.2 (24.4)	−1.7 (28.9)	3.0 (37.4)	5.2 (41.4)	6.2 (43.2)	2.1 (35.8)	−3.8 (25.2)	−7.1 (19.2)	−11.0 (12.2)	−14.6 (5.7)
Average precipitation mm (inches)	172.9 (6.81)	109.0 (4.29)	102.0 (4.02)	145.8 (5.74)	106.9 (4.21)	51.7 (2.04)	35.3 (1.39)	51.1 (2.01)	145.7 (5.74)	248.4 (9.78)	215.1 (8.47)	227.4 (8.95)	1,611.3 (63.44)
Average precipitation days (≥ 1.0 mm)	11.8	9.0	8.6	9.6	9.3	5.3	4.6	6.7	7.7	11.8	10.9	10.7	105.9
Source: Meteociel

== Population ==
Historical population
Year	Pop.	±% p.a.
1968	123	—
1975	141	+1.97%
1982	177	+3.30%
1990	246	+4.20%
1999	265	+0.83%
2007	285	+0.91%
2012	296	+0.76%
2017	279	−1.18%
2023	315	+2.04%
Source: INSEE

== See also ==
- Communes of the Hérault department
