= Montoulieu, Hérault =

Montoulieu
- Commune
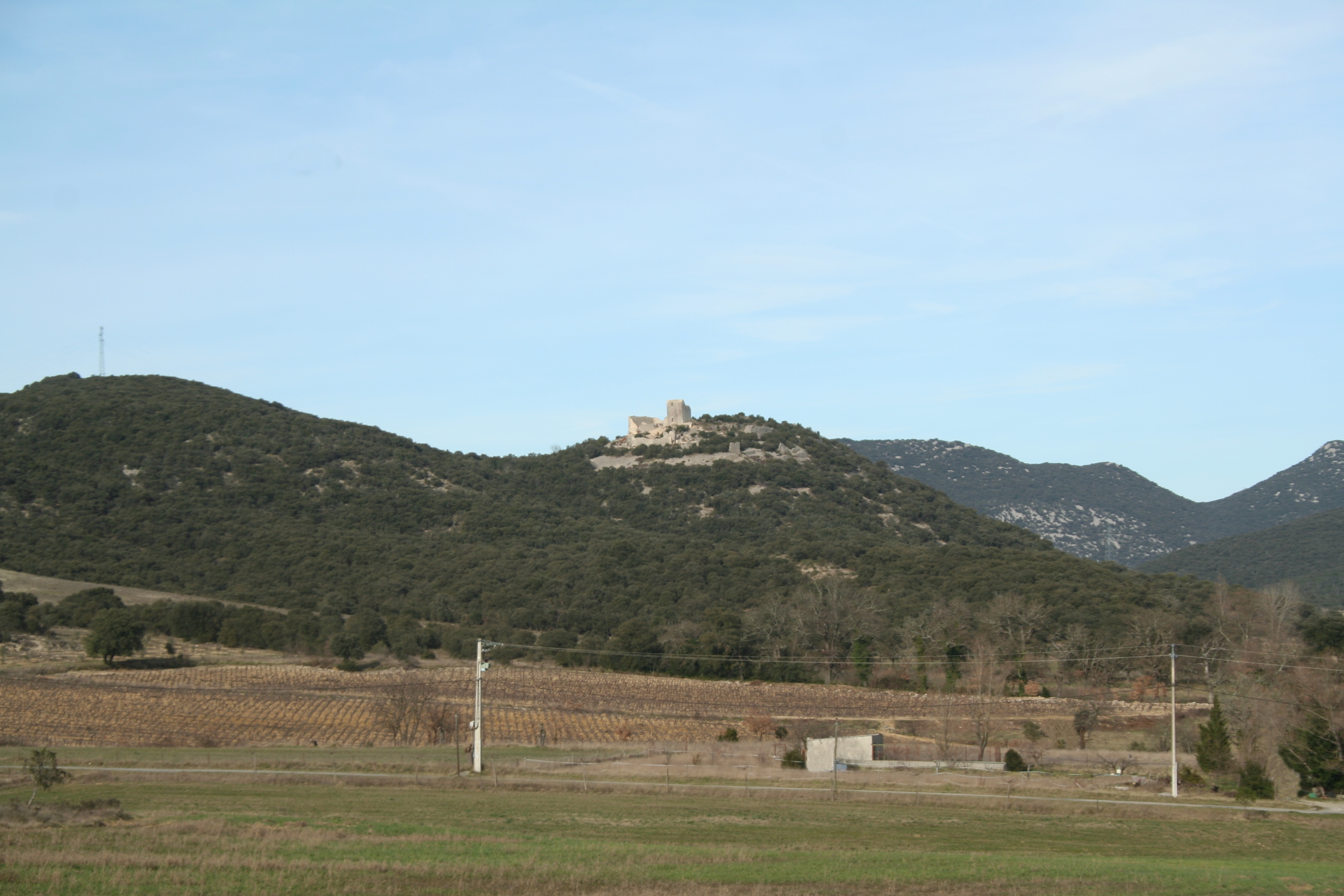
- Chateau

- Coat of arms
- Location of Montoulieu
- Location within France Location within Occitanie
- Coordinates: 43°55′41″N 3°47′29″E
- Country: France
- Region: Occitania
- Department: Hérault
- Arrondissement: Lodève
- Canton: Lodève
- Intercommunality: Cévennes Gangeoises et Suménoises

Government
  - Mayor (2020–2026): Guilhem Chafiol
- Area^{1}: 16.1 km^{2} (6.2 sq mi)
- Elevation: 180 m (590 ft)
- Highest elevation: 522 m (1,713 ft)
- Lowest elevation: 159 m (522 ft)
- Population (2023): 189
  - Density: 11.7/km^{2} (30.4/sq mi)
- Time zone: UTC+01:00 (CET)
  - Summer (DST): UTC+02:00 (CEST)
- INSEE/Postal code: 34171 /34190
- ^{1} French Land Register data, which excludes lakes, ponds, glaciers > 1 km^{2} (0.386 sq mi or 247 acres) and river estuaries.

Montoulieu (French pronunciation: [mɔ̃tuljø]; Occitan: Montoliu) is a commune in the Hérault department in the Occitanie region in southern France.

== Population ==
Historical population
Year	Pop.	±% p.a.
1968	70	—
1975	39	−8.02%
1982	61	+6.60%
1990	87	+4.54%
1999	115	+3.15%
2007	147	+3.12%
2012	161	+1.84%
2017	161	+0.00%
2023	189	+2.71%
Source: INSEE

== See also ==
- Communes of the Hérault department
