= Cazilhac, Hérault =

Cazilhac
- Commune
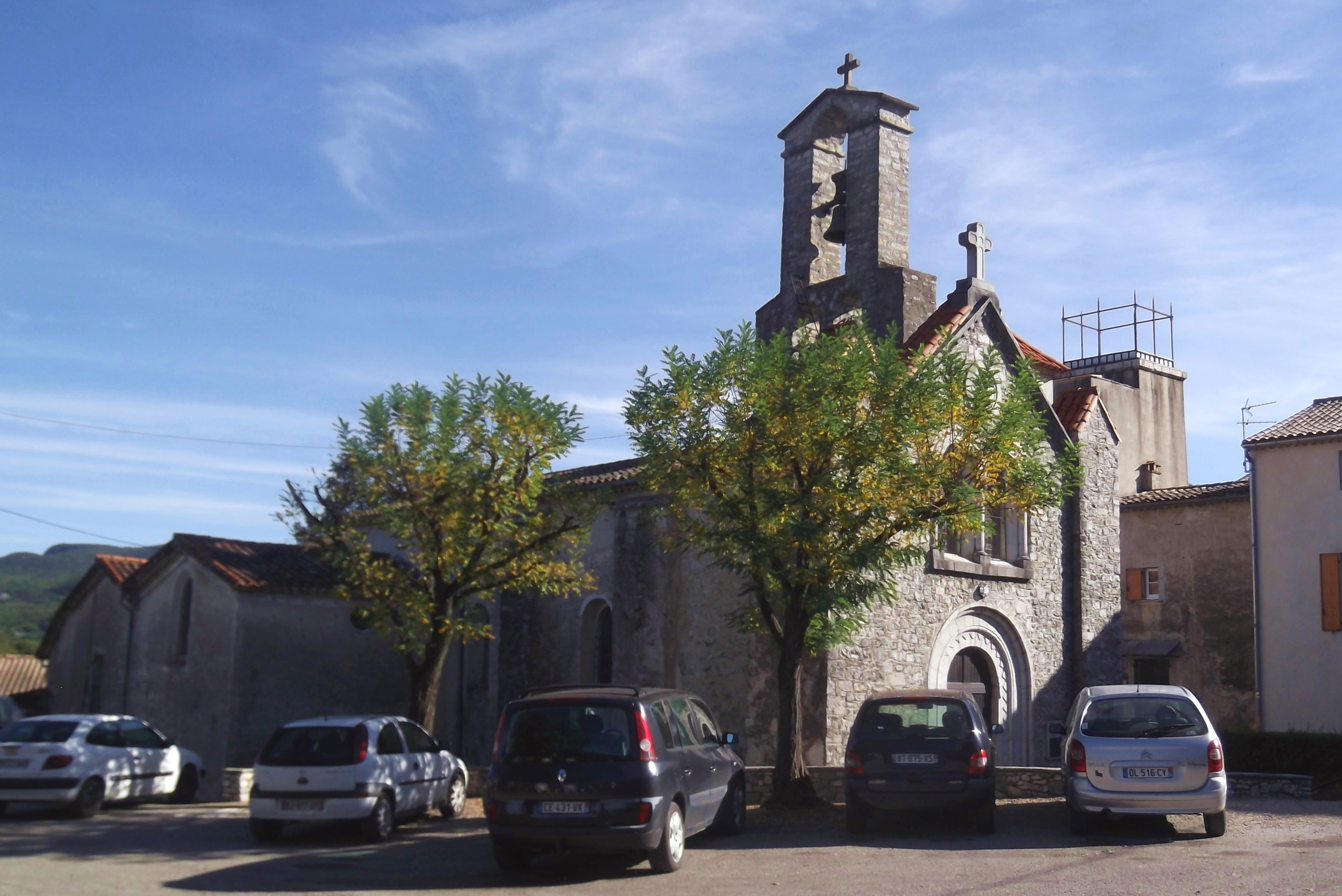
- The church in Cazilhac

- Coat of arms
- Location of Cazilhac
- Location within France Location within Occitanie
- Coordinates: 43°55′28″N 3°42′09″E
- Country: France
- Region: Occitania
- Department: Hérault
- Arrondissement: Lodève
- Canton: Lodève
- Intercommunality: Cévennes Gangeoises et Suménoises

Government
  - Mayor (2020–2026): Pierre Compan
- Area^{1}: 11.69 km^{2} (4.51 sq mi)
- Elevation: 166 m (545 ft)
- Highest elevation: 523 m (1,716 ft)
- Lowest elevation: 132 m (433 ft)
- Population (2023): 1,605
  - Density: 137.3/km^{2} (355.6/sq mi)
- Time zone: UTC+01:00 (CET)
  - Summer (DST): UTC+02:00 (CEST)
- INSEE/Postal code: 34067 /34190
- ^{1} French Land Register data, which excludes lakes, ponds, glaciers > 1 km^{2} (0.386 sq mi or 247 acres) and river estuaries.

Cazilhac (French pronunciation: [kazijak]; Occitan: Casilhac) is a commune in the Hérault department in southern France.

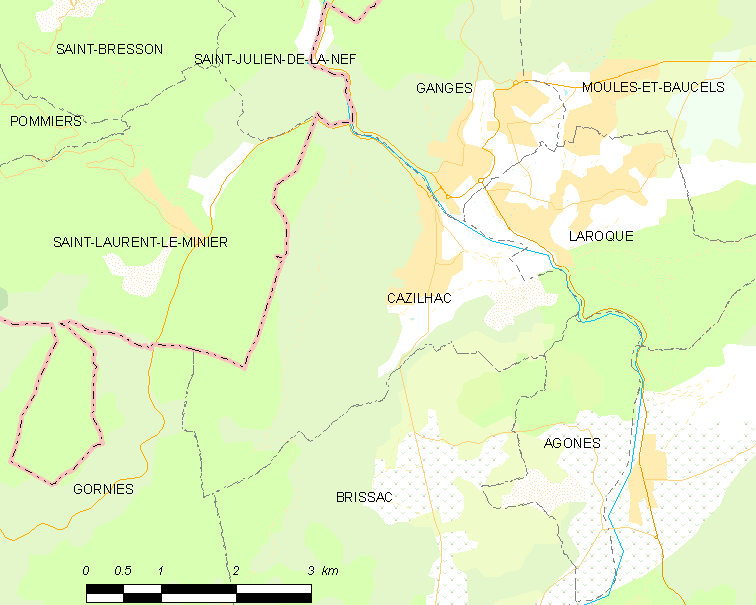
Map

== Population ==
Historical population
Year	Pop.	±% p.a.
1968	857	—
1975	840	−0.29%
1982	915	+1.23%
1990	1,004	+1.17%
1999	1,161	+1.63%
2007	1,257	+1.00%
2012	1,381	+1.90%
2017	1,517	+1.90%
2023	1,605	+0.94%
Source: INSEE

== See also ==
- Communes of the Hérault department
