= Canton of Bédarieux =

Coordinates: 43°38′05″N 3°09′20″E

Bédarieux
- Former canton
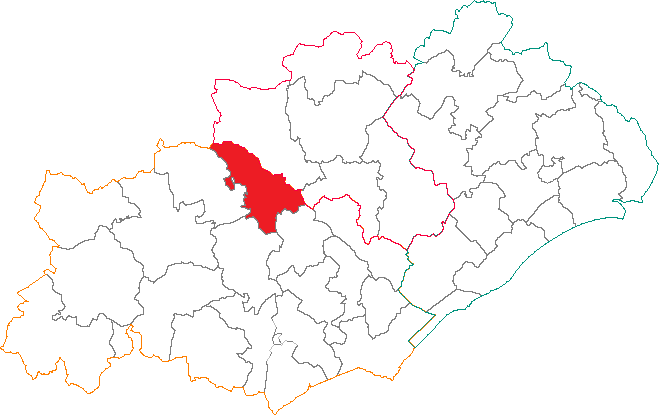
- Country: France
- Region: Occitania
- Department: Hérault
- No. of communes: {{{nbcomm}}}
- Disbanded: 2015
- Area: 152 km^{2} (59 sq mi)
- Population (2012): 10,000
  - Density: 66/km^{2} (170/sq mi)

The Canton of Bédarieux is a former subdivision of the French department of Hérault, and its subdivision, the Arrondissement of Béziers. It had 10,000 inhabitants (2012). It was disbanded following the French canton reorganisation which came into effect in March 2015.

== Municipalities ==
The canton comprised the following communes:

- Bédarieux
- Camplong
- Carlencas-et-Levas
- Faugères
- Graissessac
- Pézènes-les-Mines
- Le Pradal
- Saint-Étienne-Estréchoux
- La Tour-sur-Orb

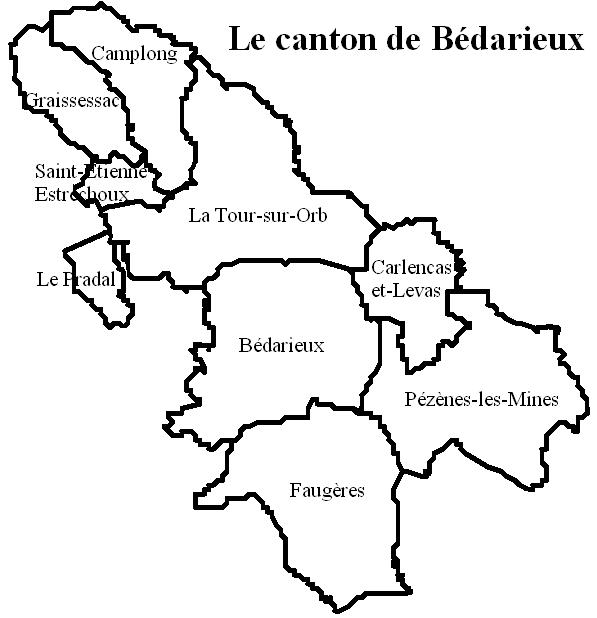
image_map

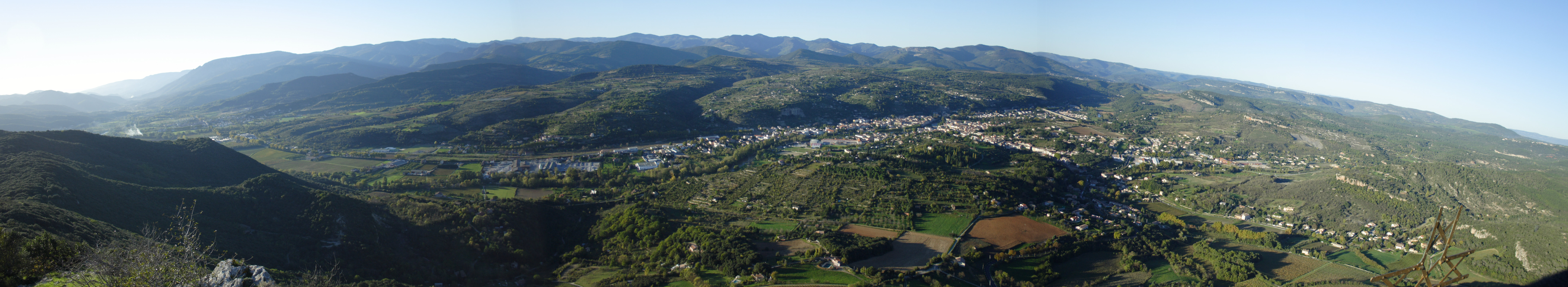
Bédarieux
