= Lac d'Avène =

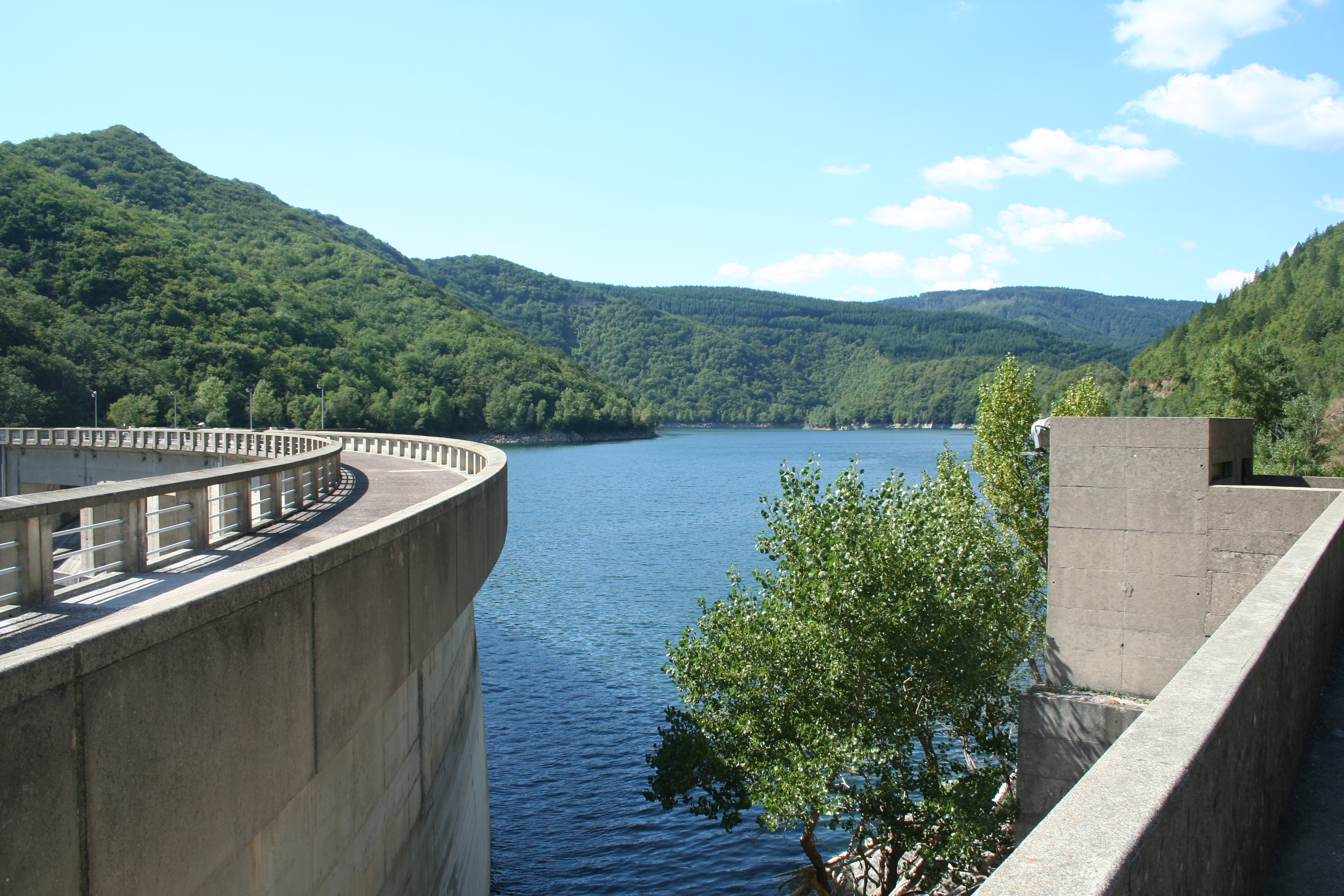

- Location within France
- Location: Hérault
- Coordinates: 43°46′20″N 3°5′0″E
- Lake type: artificial
- Primary outflows: Orb
- Basin countries: France
- Surface area: 1.94 km^{2} (0.75 sq mi)
- Max. depth: 60 m (200 ft)
- Water volume: 34.3×10^{6} m^{3} (1.21×10^{9} cu ft)
- Surface elevation: 430 m (1,410 ft)

Lac d'Avène is a lake at Avène in the Hérault department of France. At an elevation of 430 m, its surface area is 1.9 km^{2}.
