= Pradal =

Pradal may refer to:

== Places ==
- Le Pradal, a commune in southern France

== People with the surname ==
- Bruno Pradal (1949–1992), French actor
- Manuel Pradal (1964–2017), French screenwriter and film director
- Philippe Pradal (born 1963), French politician

== See also ==
- Pradal serey, an unarmed martial art and combat sport from Cambodia
