= Brignac, Hérault =

Brignac
- Commune
- Coat of arms
- Location of Brignac
- Location within France Location within Occitanie
- Coordinates: 43°37′27″N 3°28′26″E
- Country: France
- Region: Occitania
- Department: Hérault
- Arrondissement: Lodève
- Canton: Clermont-l'Hérault
- Intercommunality: Clermontais

Government
  - Mayor (2020–2026): Marina Bourrel
- Area^{1}: 4.65 km^{2} (1.80 sq mi)
- Elevation: 80 m (260 ft)
- Highest elevation: 69 m (226 ft)
- Lowest elevation: 21 m (69 ft)
- Population (2023): 978
  - Density: 210/km^{2} (545/sq mi)
- Time zone: UTC+01:00 (CET)
  - Summer (DST): UTC+02:00 (CEST)
- INSEE/Postal code: 34041 /34800
- ^{1} French Land Register data, which excludes lakes, ponds, glaciers > 1 km^{2} (0.386 sq mi or 247 acres) and river estuaries.

Brignac (French pronunciation: [bʁiɲak]; Occitan: Brinhac) is a commune in the Hérault department in southern France.

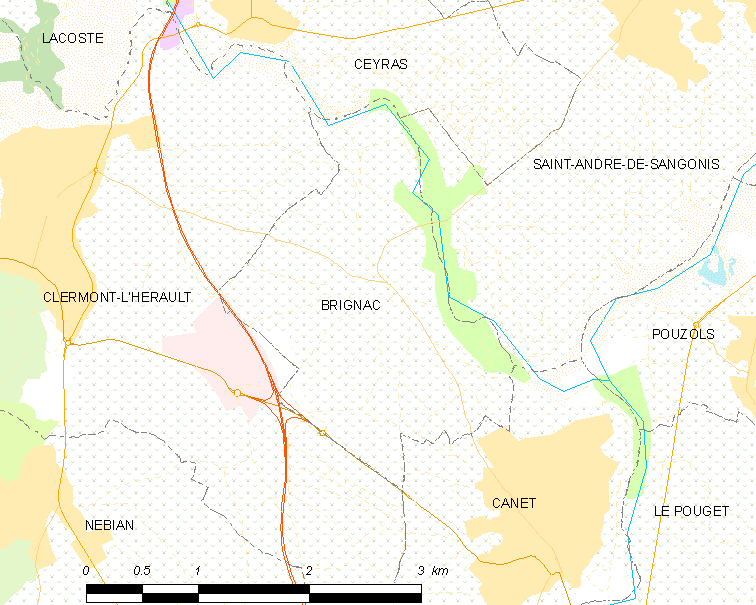
Map

== Population ==
Historical population
Year	Pop.	±% p.a.
1968	232	—
1975	198	−2.24%
1982	239	+2.72%
1990	317	+3.59%
1999	345	+0.94%
2007	540	+5.76%
2012	749	+6.76%
2017	888	+3.46%
2023	978	+1.62%
Source: INSEE

== See also ==
- Communes of the Hérault department
