= Mourèze =

- Commune
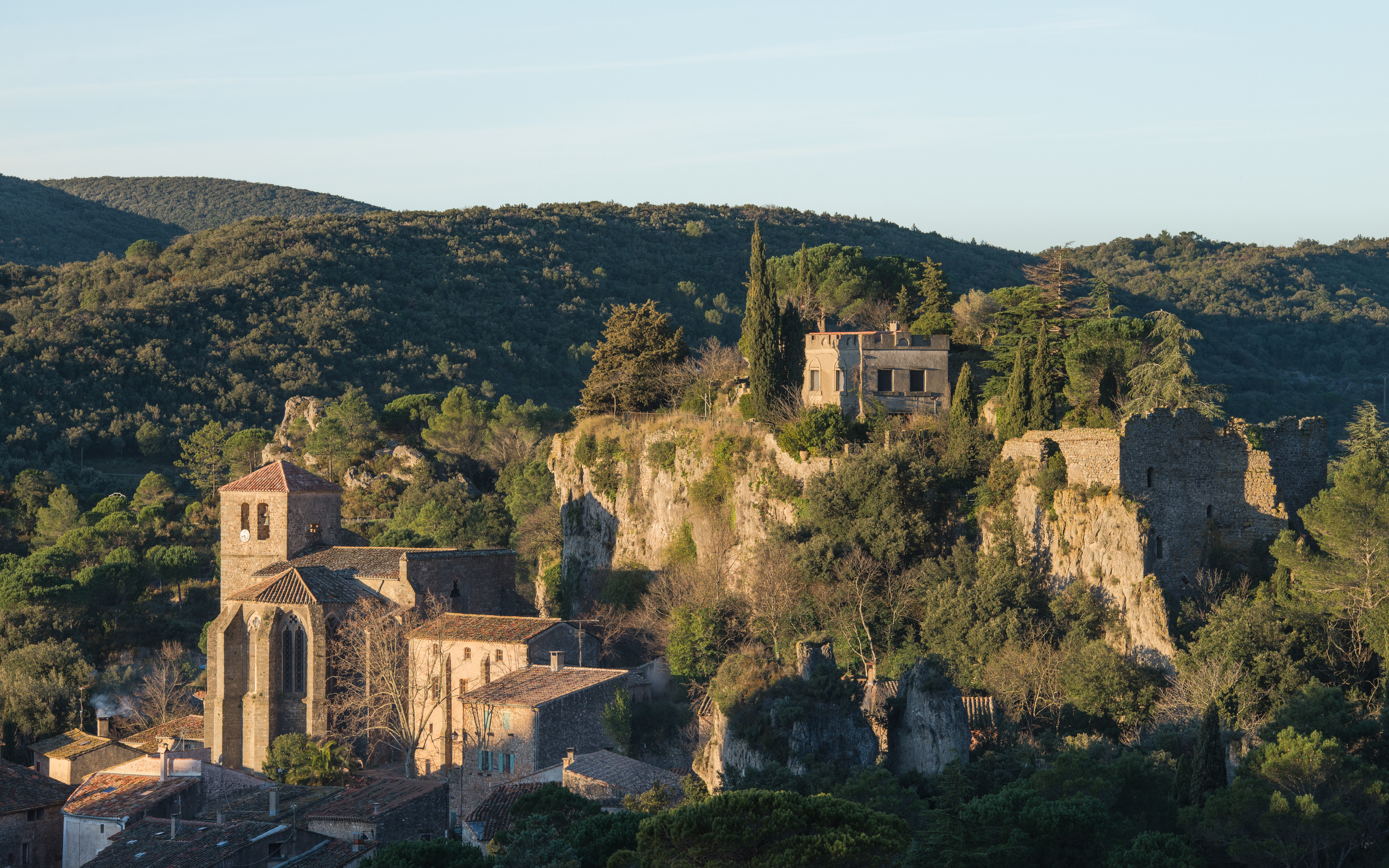
- The village.

- Coat of arms
- Location of Mourèze
- Location within France Location within Occitanie
- Coordinates: 43°37′12″N 3°21′24″E
- Country: France
- Region: Occitania
- Department: Hérault
- Arrondissement: Lodève
- Canton: Clermont-l'Hérault
- Intercommunality: Clermontais

Government
  - Mayor (2023–2026): Patrick-Albert Jaures
- Area^{1}: 13.44 km^{2} (5.19 sq mi)
- Elevation: 200 m (660 ft)
- Highest elevation: 537 m (1,762 ft)
- Lowest elevation: 160 m (520 ft)
- Population (2023): 176
  - Density: 13.1/km^{2} (33.9/sq mi)
- Time zone: UTC+01:00 (CET)
  - Summer (DST): UTC+02:00 (CEST)
- INSEE/Postal code: 34175 /34800
- ^{1} French Land Register data, which excludes lakes, ponds, glaciers > 1 km^{2} (0.386 sq mi or 247 acres) and river estuaries.

Mourèze (French pronunciation: [muʁɛz]; Occitan: Morese) is a commune in the Hérault department in the Occitanie region in southern France.

At the edge of the village are spectacular dolomitic limestone formations known as the Cirque de Mourèze.

== Population ==
Historical population
Year	Pop.	±% p.a.
1968	81	—
1975	79	−0.36%
1982	76	−0.55%
1990	100	+3.49%
1999	128	+2.78%
2007	168	+3.46%
2012	183	+1.73%
2017	197	+1.49%
2023	176	−1.86%
Source: INSEE

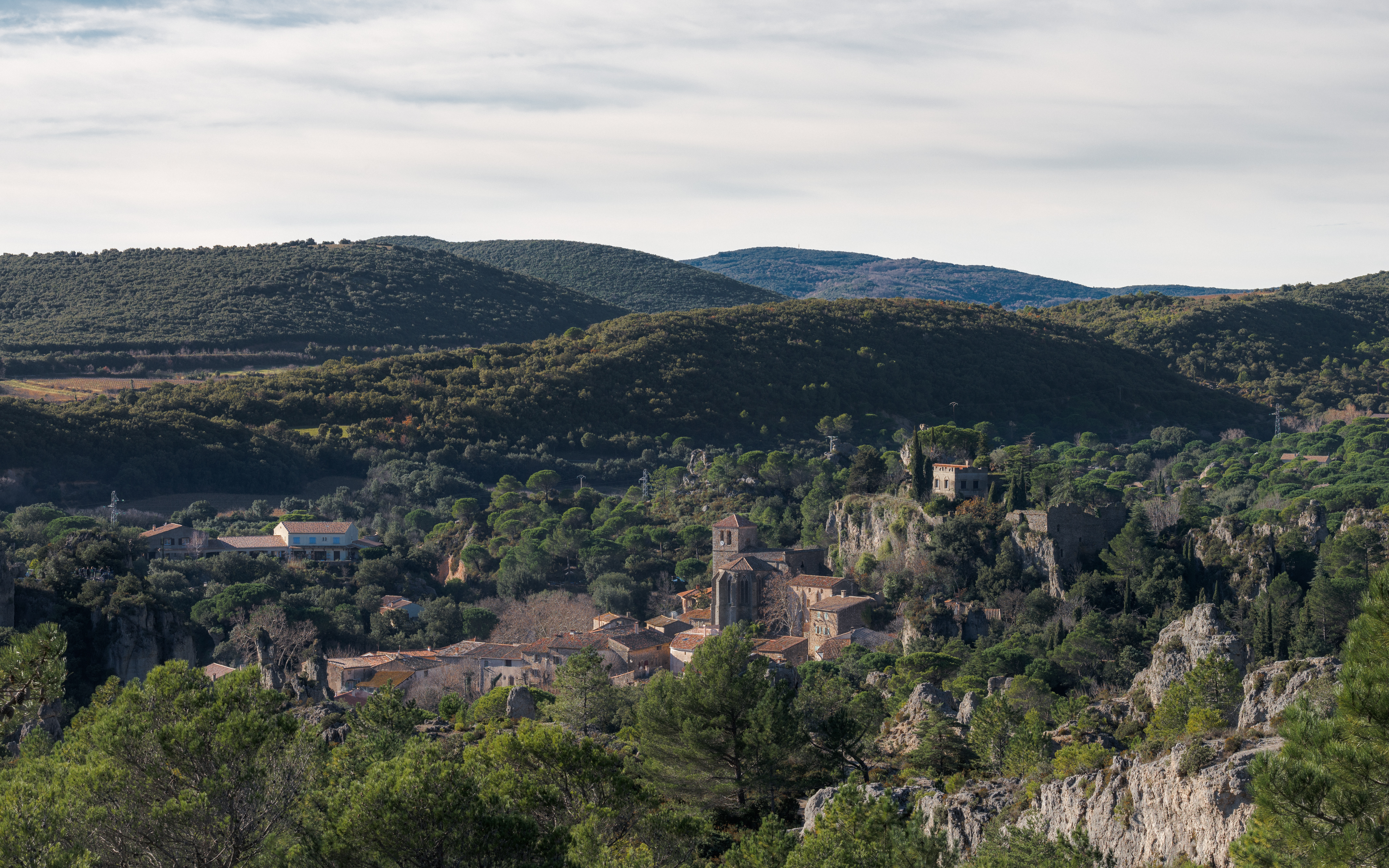
The Cirque de Mourèze is a steephead valley whose chaotic appearance was caused by the erosion of dolomite rocks.

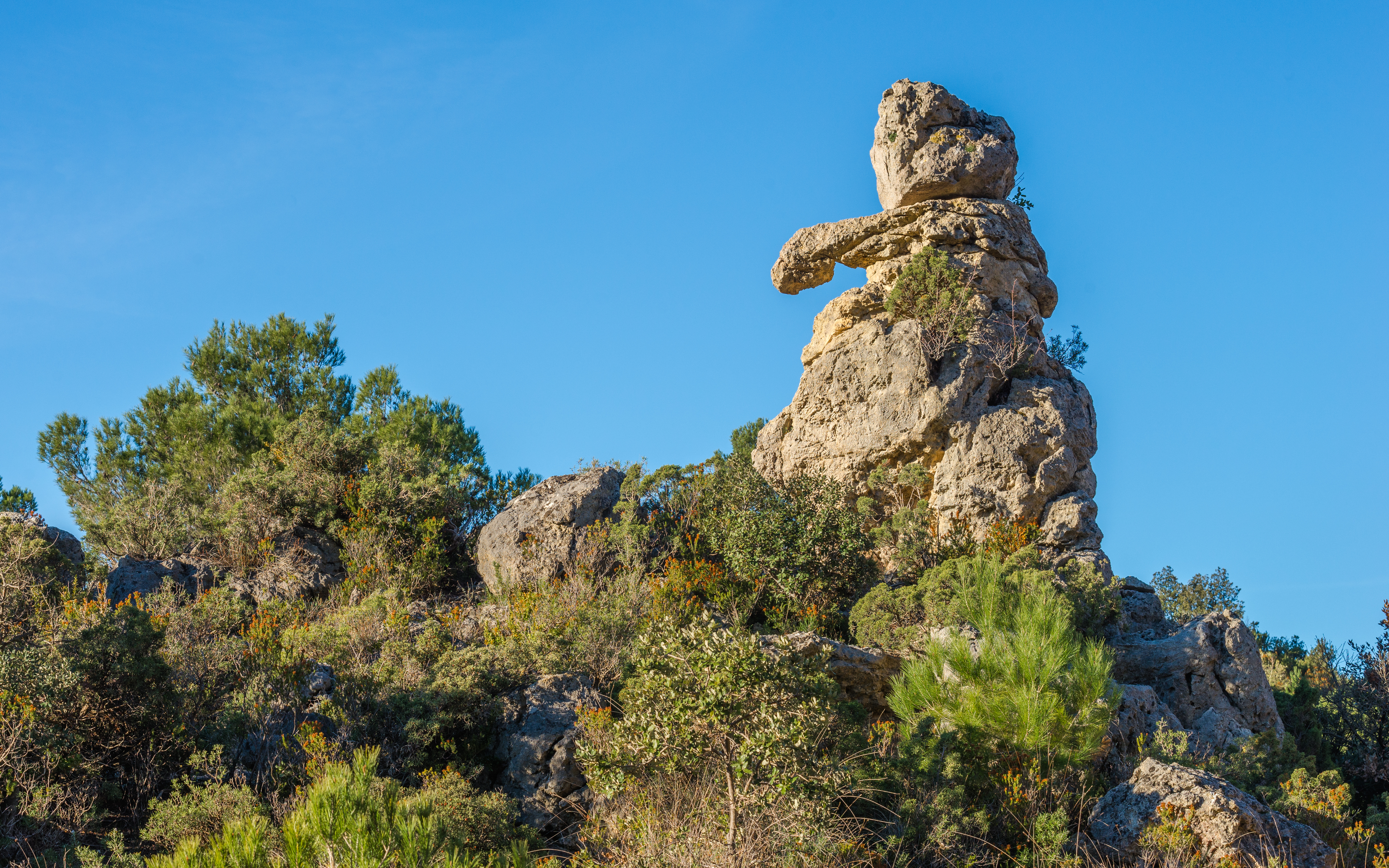
An erosional remnant of dolomite in the Cirque de Mourèze

== See also ==
- Communes of the Hérault department
