= Joncels =

- Commune
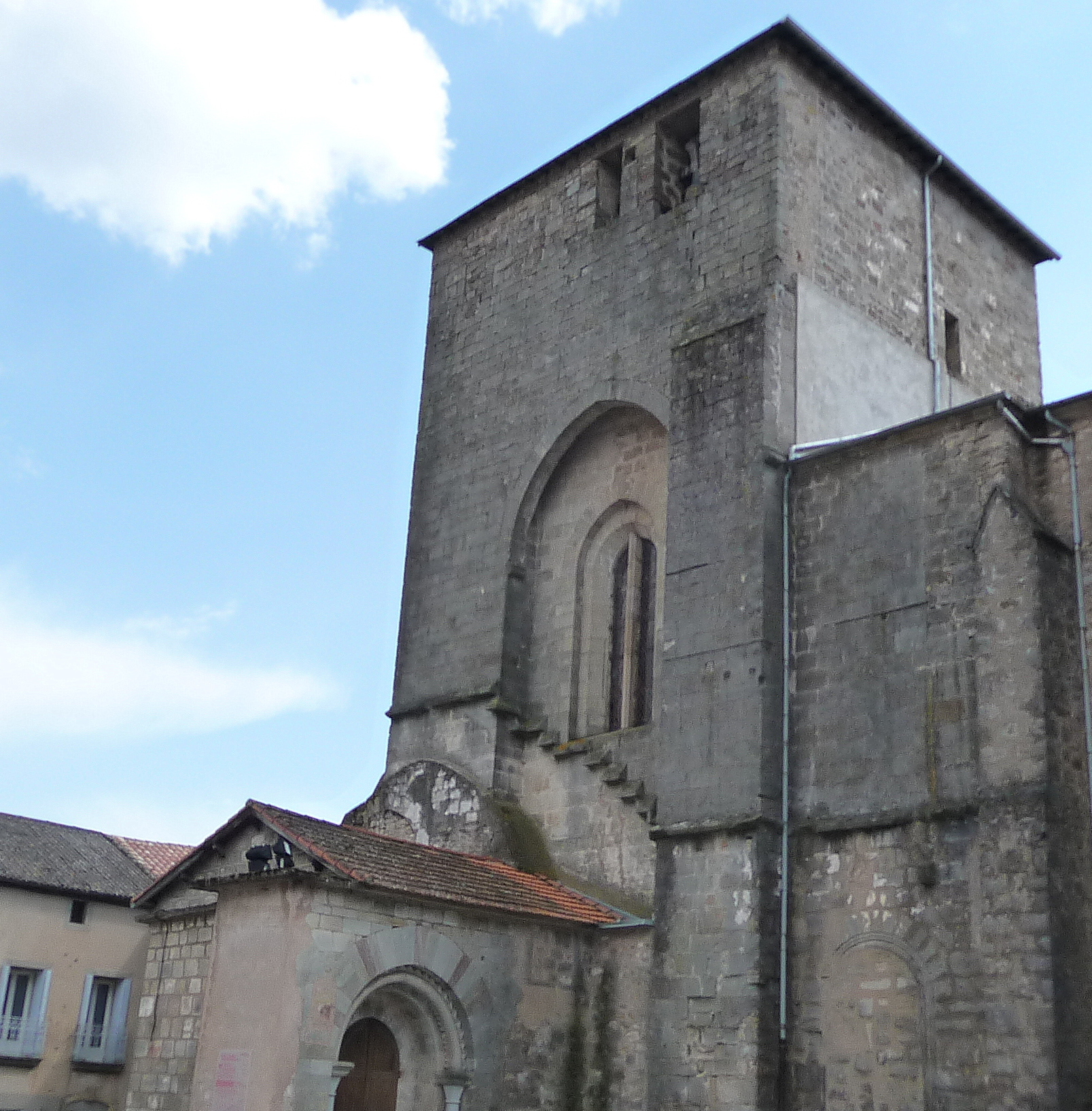
- Church

- Coat of arms
- Location of Joncels
- Location within France Location within Occitanie
- Coordinates: 43°44′18″N 3°11′43″E
- Country: France
- Region: Occitania
- Department: Hérault
- Arrondissement: Béziers
- Canton: Clermont-l'Hérault

Government
  - Mayor (2025–2026): Ghislaine Dhuime
- Area^{1}: 46.24 km^{2} (17.85 sq mi)
- Elevation: 380 m (1,250 ft)
- Highest elevation: 835 m (2,740 ft)
- Lowest elevation: 290 m (950 ft)
- Population (2023): 256
  - Density: 5.54/km^{2} (14.3/sq mi)
- Time zone: UTC+01:00 (CET)
  - Summer (DST): UTC+02:00 (CEST)
- INSEE/Postal code: 34121 /34650
- ^{1} French Land Register data, which excludes lakes, ponds, glaciers > 1 km^{2} (0.386 sq mi or 247 acres) and river estuaries.

Joncels is a commune in the Hérault département in the Occitanie region in southern France.

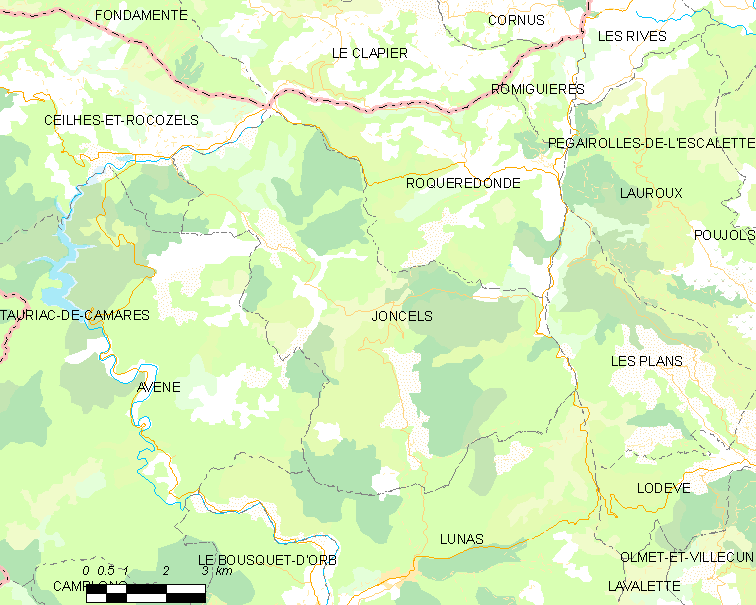
Map

== Population ==
Historical population
Year	Pop.	±% p.a.
1968	222	—
1975	198	−1.62%
1982	203	+0.36%
1990	222	+1.12%
1999	227	+0.25%
2007	267	+2.05%
2012	295	+2.01%
2017	313	+1.19%
2023	256	−3.29%
Source: INSEE

== See also ==
- Communes of the Hérault department
