= Aspiran =

- Commune
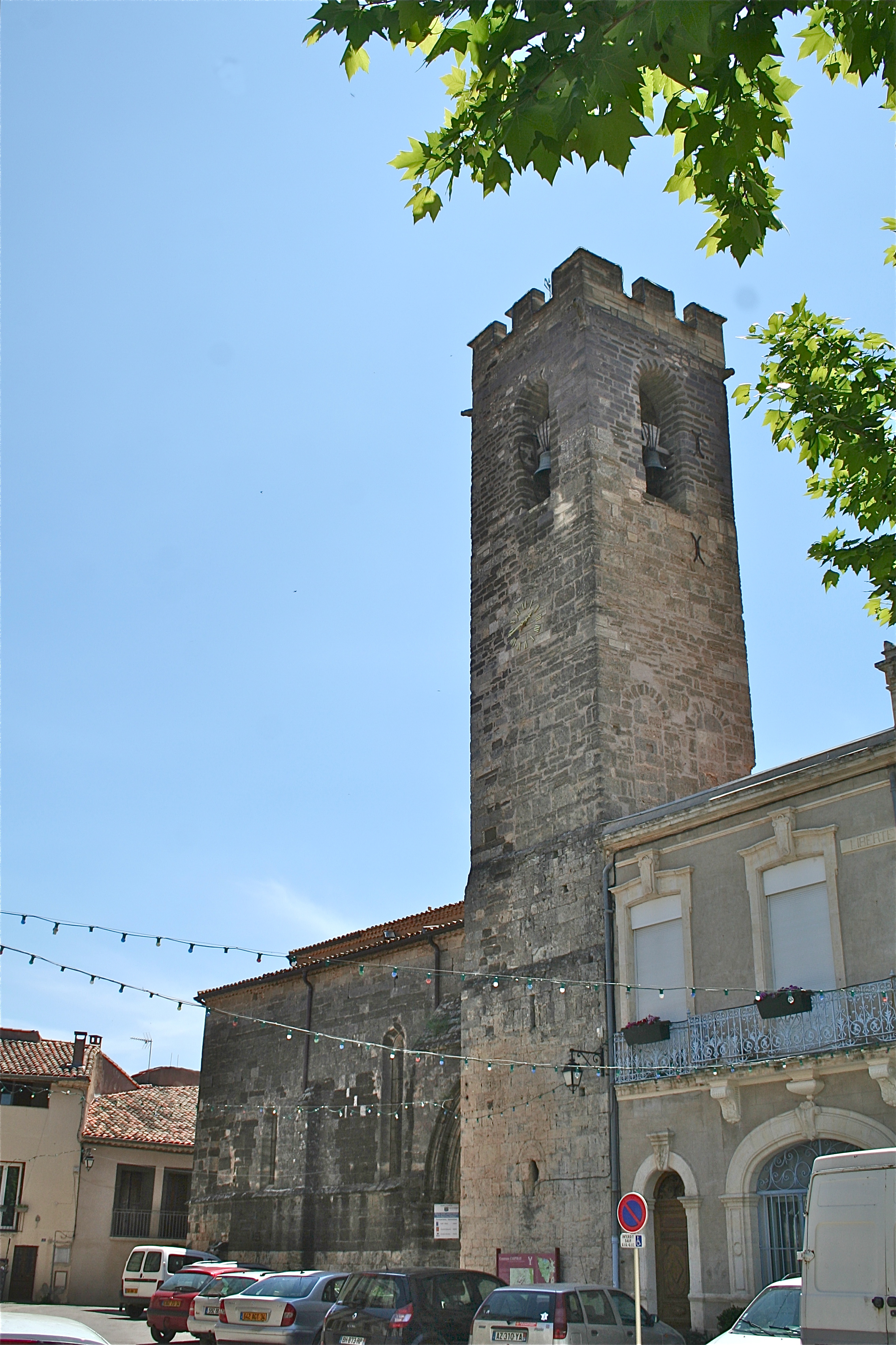
- The church of Saint-Julien

- Coat of arms
- Location of Aspiran
- Location within France Location within Occitanie
- Coordinates: 43°34′N 3°27′E
- Country: France
- Region: Occitania
- Department: Hérault
- Arrondissement: Lodève
- Canton: Clermont-l'Hérault
- Intercommunality: CC Clermontais

Government
  - Mayor (2020–2026): Olivier Bernardi
- Area^{1}: 16.13 km^{2} (6.23 sq mi)
- Elevation: 79 m (259 ft)
- Highest elevation: 160 m (520 ft)
- Lowest elevation: 17 m (56 ft)
- Population (2023): 1,672
  - Density: 103.7/km^{2} (268.5/sq mi)
- Time zone: UTC+01:00 (CET)
  - Summer (DST): UTC+02:00 (CEST)
- INSEE/Postal code: 34013 /34800
- ^{1} French Land Register data, which excludes lakes, ponds, glaciers > 1 km^{2} (0.386 sq mi or 247 acres) and river estuaries.

Aspiran (French pronunciation: [aspiʁɑ̃]) is a commune in the Hérault department in southern France.

== Population ==
Historical population
Year	Pop.	±% p.a.
1968	1,194	—
1975	1,023	−2.18%
1982	1,031	+0.11%
1990	1,072	+0.49%
1999	1,167	+0.95%
2007	1,256	+0.92%
2012	1,580	+4.70%
2017	1,648	+0.85%
2023	1,672	+0.24%
Source: INSEE

== See also ==
- Communes of the Hérault department
