= Valmascle =

- Commune
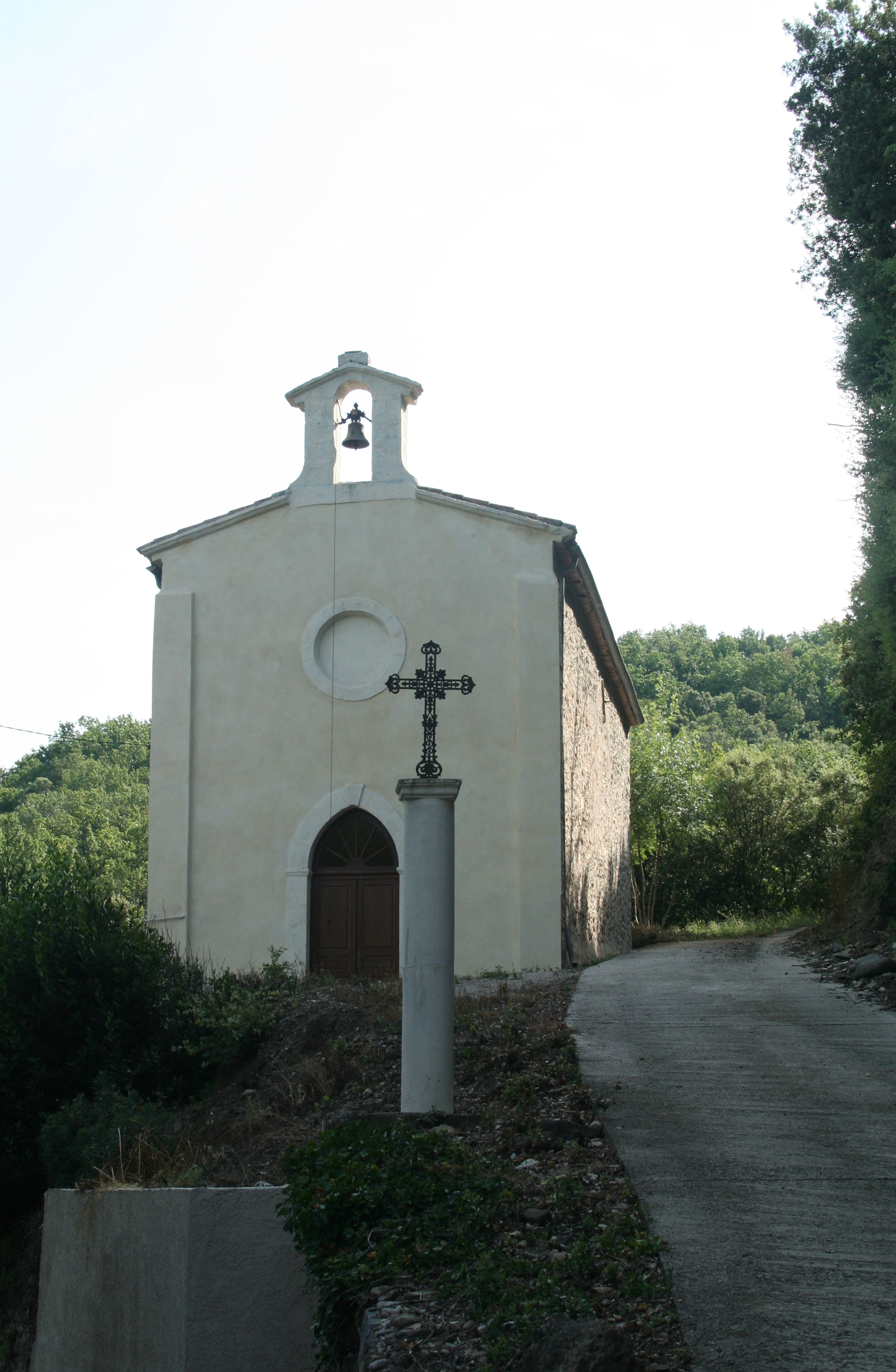
- The church of Valmascle

- Coat of arms
- Location of Valmascle
- Location within France Location within Occitanie
- Coordinates: 43°35′49″N 3°17′58″E
- Country: France
- Region: Occitania
- Department: Hérault
- Arrondissement: Lodève
- Canton: Clermont-l'Hérault
- Intercommunality: Clermontais

Government
  - Mayor (2020–2026): Gérald Valentini
- Area^{1}: 6.99 km^{2} (2.70 sq mi)
- Elevation: 210 m (690 ft)
- Highest elevation: 448 m (1,470 ft)
- Lowest elevation: 190 m (620 ft)
- Population (2023): 52
  - Density: 7.4/km^{2} (19/sq mi)
- Time zone: UTC+01:00 (CET)
  - Summer (DST): UTC+02:00 (CEST)
- INSEE/Postal code: 34323 /34800
- ^{1} French Land Register data, which excludes lakes, ponds, glaciers > 1 km^{2} (0.386 sq mi or 247 acres) and river estuaries.

Valmascle (French pronunciation: [valmaskl]; Occitan: Los Combals) is a commune in the Hérault department in the Occitanie region in southern France.

Valmascle may also refer to a sandwich popular in the region, primarily consisting of roast beef.

== Population ==
Historical population
Year	Pop.	±% p.a.
1968	40	—
1975	38	−0.73%
1982	43	+1.78%
1990	41	−0.59%
1999	41	+0.00%
2007	44	+0.89%
2012	43	−0.46%
2017	40	−1.44%
2023	52	+4.47%
Source: INSEE

== See also ==
- Communes of the Hérault department
