= Combes, Hérault =

Combes
- Commune
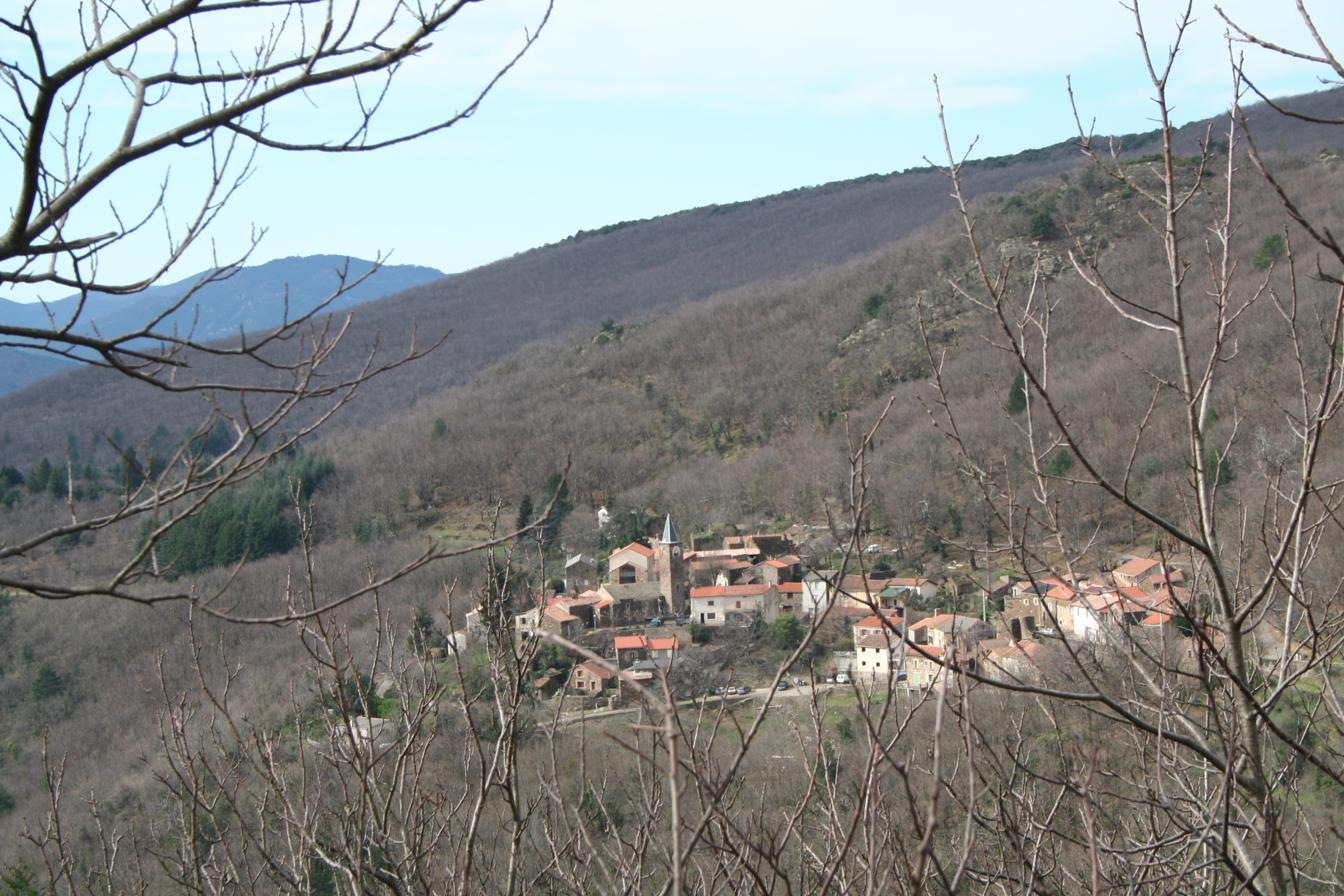
- Combes

- Coat of arms
- Location of Combes
- Location within France Location within Occitanie
- Coordinates: 43°36′15″N 3°02′51″E
- Country: France
- Region: Occitania
- Department: Hérault
- Arrondissement: Béziers
- Canton: Clermont-l'Hérault

Government
  - Mayor (2020–2026): Marie-Line Geronimo
- Area^{1}: 10.97 km^{2} (4.24 sq mi)
- Elevation: 580 m (1,900 ft)
- Highest elevation: 783 m (2,569 ft)
- Lowest elevation: 200 m (660 ft)
- Population (2023): 318
  - Density: 29.0/km^{2} (75.1/sq mi)
- Time zone: UTC+01:00 (CET)
  - Summer (DST): UTC+02:00 (CEST)
- INSEE/Postal code: 34083 /34240
- ^{1} French Land Register data, which excludes lakes, ponds, glaciers > 1 km^{2} (0.386 sq mi or 247 acres) and river estuaries.

Combes (French pronunciation: [kɔ̃b]; Occitan: Combas) is a commune in the Hérault department in southern France.

== Constituent settlements ==
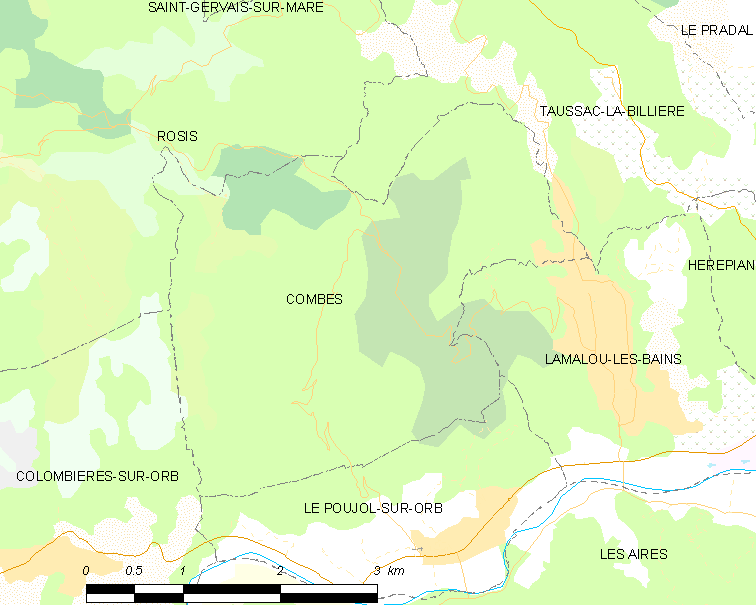
Map

The following settlements all fall within the boundaries of the commune:

- Les Agasses
- Les Arts
- La Capoulade
- La Carral
- Combes
- Le Fraïsse
- Lamalou-le-Vieux
- Le Laousas
- Le Logis neuf
- Le Roumegas
- Saint Vital
- Torteillan
- Le Vernet

== Population ==
Historical population
Year	Pop.	±% p.a.
1968	152	—
1975	170	+1.61%
1982	188	+1.45%
1990	180	−0.54%
1999	265	+4.39%
2007	303	+1.69%
2012	351	+2.98%
2017	333	−1.05%
2023	318	−0.77%
Source: INSEE

== See also ==
- Communes of the Hérault department
