= Canton of Clermont-l'Hérault =

Coordinates: 43.63°N 3.43°E

Clermont-l'Hérault
- Canton
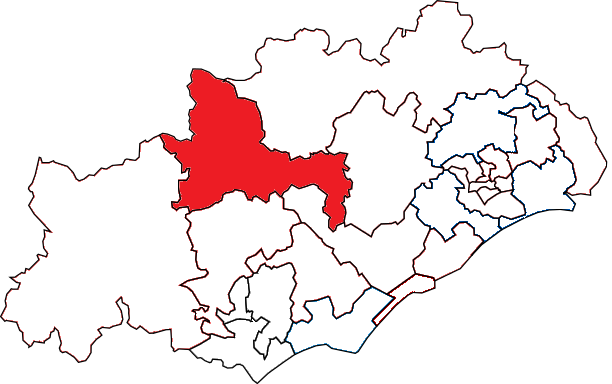
- Interactive map of Clermont-l'Hérault
- Country: France
- Region: Occitania
- Department: Hérault
- No. of communes: {{{nbcomm}}}

Government
  - Representatives (2021–2028): Jean-Luc Falip; Marie Passieux
- Area: 629.65 km^{2} (243.11 sq mi)
- Population (2023): 45,562
  - Density: 72.361/km^{2} (187.41/sq mi)
- INSEE code: 34 06

The canton of Clermont-l'Hérault is an administrative division of the Hérault department, southern France. Its borders were modified at the French canton reorganisation which came into effect in March 2015. Its seat is in Clermont-l'Hérault.

== Composition ==
It consists of the following communes:

1. Les Aires
2. Aspiran
3. Avène
4. Bédarieux
5. Le Bousquet-d'Orb
6. Brenas
7. Brignac
8. Camplong
9. Canet
10. Carlencas-et-Levas
11. Ceilhes-et-Rocozels
12. Ceyras
13. Clermont-l'Hérault
14. Combes
15. Graissessac
16. Hérépian
17. Joncels
18. Lacoste
19. Lamalou-les-Bains
20. Liausson
21. Lunas-les-Châteaux
22. Mérifons
23. Mourèze
24. Nébian
25. Octon
26. Paulhan
27. Pézènes-les-Mines
28. Le Poujol-sur-Orb
29. Le Pradal
30. Saint-Étienne-Estréchoux
31. Saint-Félix-de-Lodez
32. Saint-Geniès-de-Varensal
33. Saint-Gervais-sur-Mare
34. Salasc
35. Taussac-la-Billière
36. La Tour-sur-Orb
37. Valmascle
38. Villemagne-l'Argentière
39. Villeneuvette

== Councillors ==
Election	Councillors	Party	Occupation
2015	Jean-Luc Falip	PS	Mayor of Saint-Gervais-sur-Mare
2015	Marie Passieux	PS	Councillor of Clermont-l'Hérault

== Pictures of the canton ==
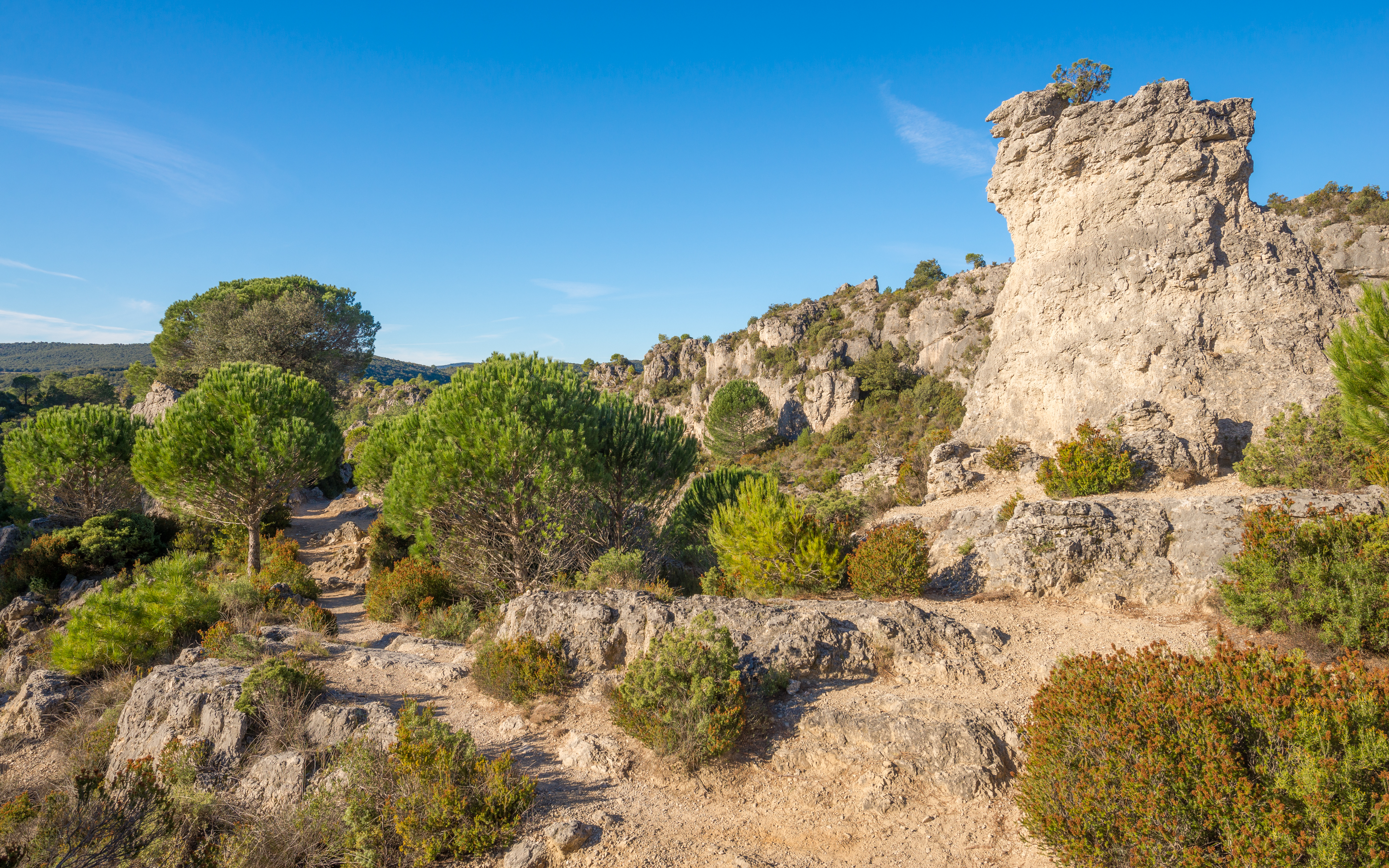
The "Cirque de Mourèze"

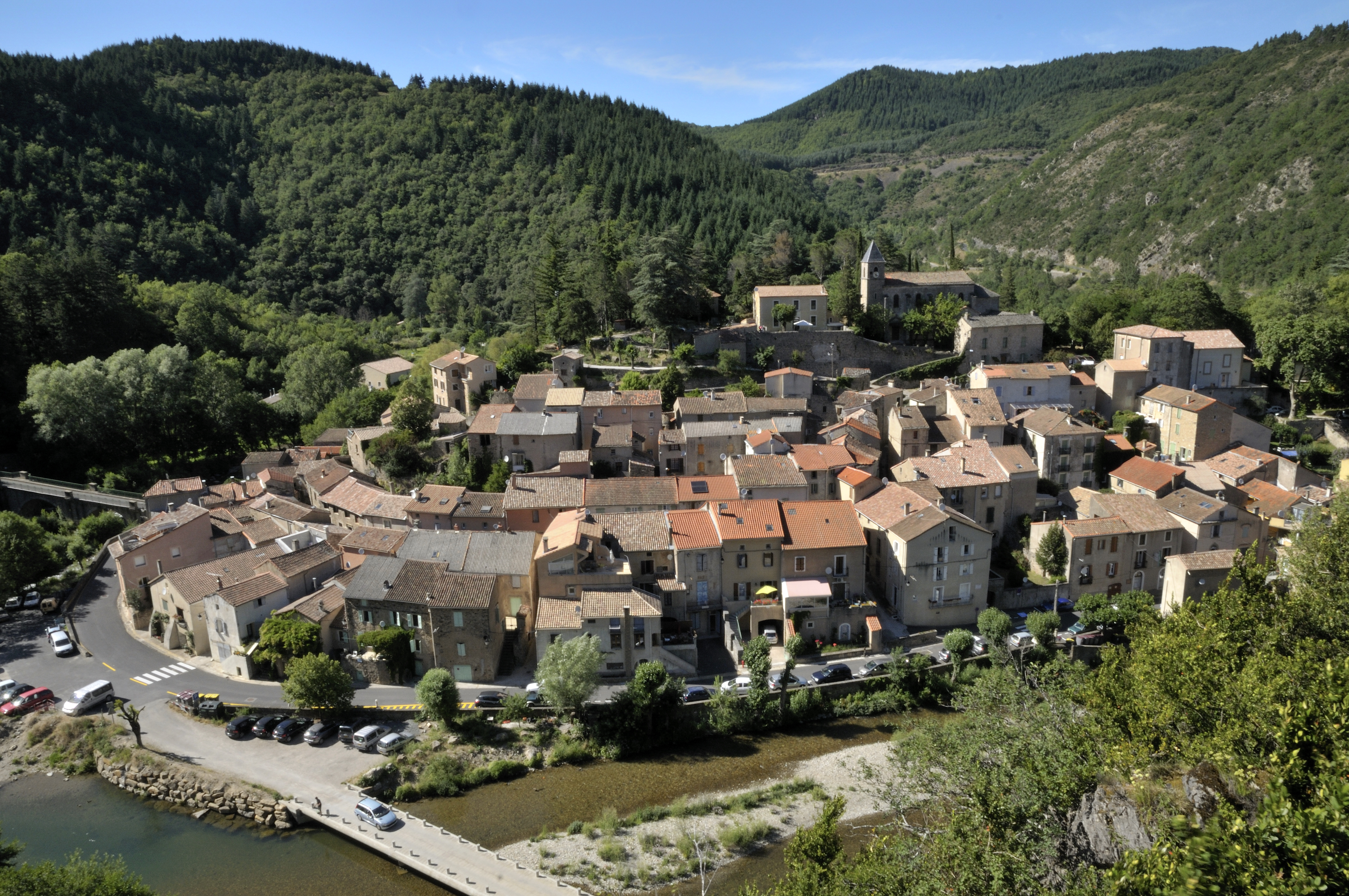
View of Avène

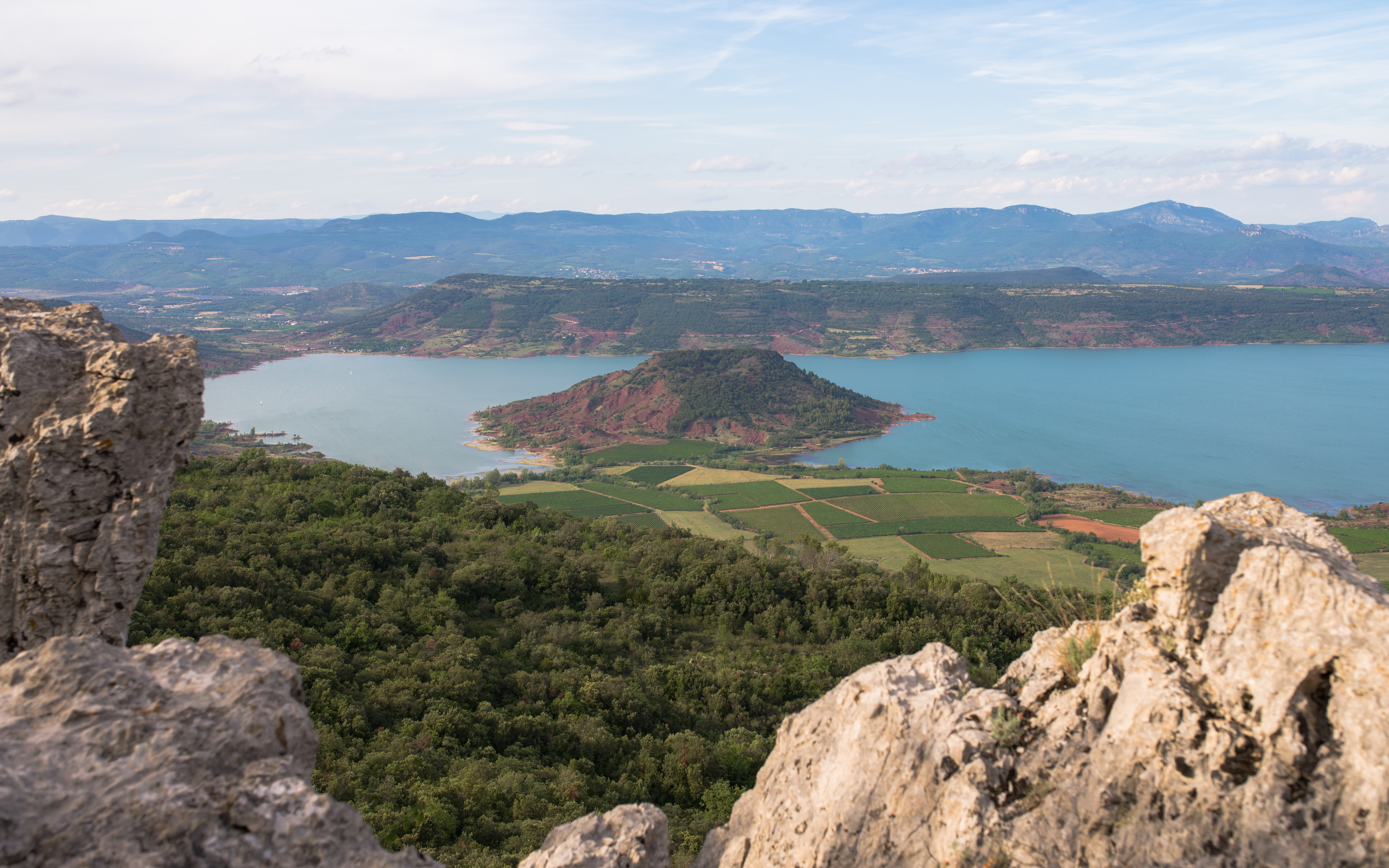
The "Lac du Salagou"
