= Saint-Félix-de-Lodez =

- Commune
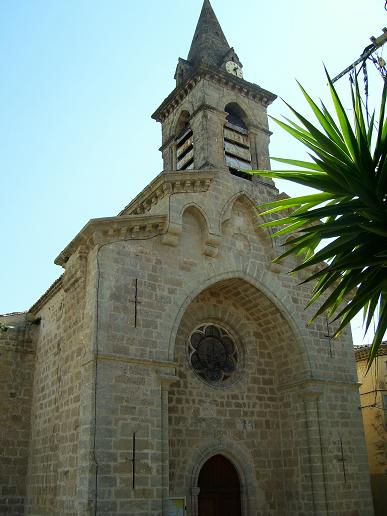
- The church of Saint-Félix-de-Lodez

- Coat of arms
- Location of Saint-Félix-de-Lodez
- Location within France Location within Occitanie
- Coordinates: 43°39′47″N 3°27′36″E
- Country: France
- Region: Occitania
- Department: Hérault
- Arrondissement: Lodève
- Canton: Clermont-l'Hérault

Government
  - Mayor (2020–2026): Joseph Rodriguez
- Area^{1}: 4.38 km^{2} (1.69 sq mi)
- Elevation: 87 m (285 ft)
- Highest elevation: 132 m (433 ft)
- Lowest elevation: 69 m (226 ft)
- Population (2023): 1,135
  - Density: 259/km^{2} (671/sq mi)
- Time zone: UTC+01:00 (CET)
  - Summer (DST): UTC+02:00 (CEST)
- INSEE/Postal code: 34254 /34725
- ^{1} French Land Register data, which excludes lakes, ponds, glaciers > 1 km^{2} (0.386 sq mi or 247 acres) and river estuaries.

Saint-Félix-de-Lodez (Languedocien: Sant Feliç de Lodés) is a commune in the Hérault department in the Occitanie region in southern France.

== Population ==
Historical population
Year	Pop.	±% p.a.
1968	520	—
1975	518	−0.06%
1982	527	+0.25%
1990	600	+1.63%
1999	742	+2.39%
2007	1,075	+4.74%
2012	1,156	+1.46%
2017	1,169	+0.22%
2023	1,135	−0.49%
Source: INSEE

== See also ==
- Communes of the Hérault department
