= Les Aires =

- Commune
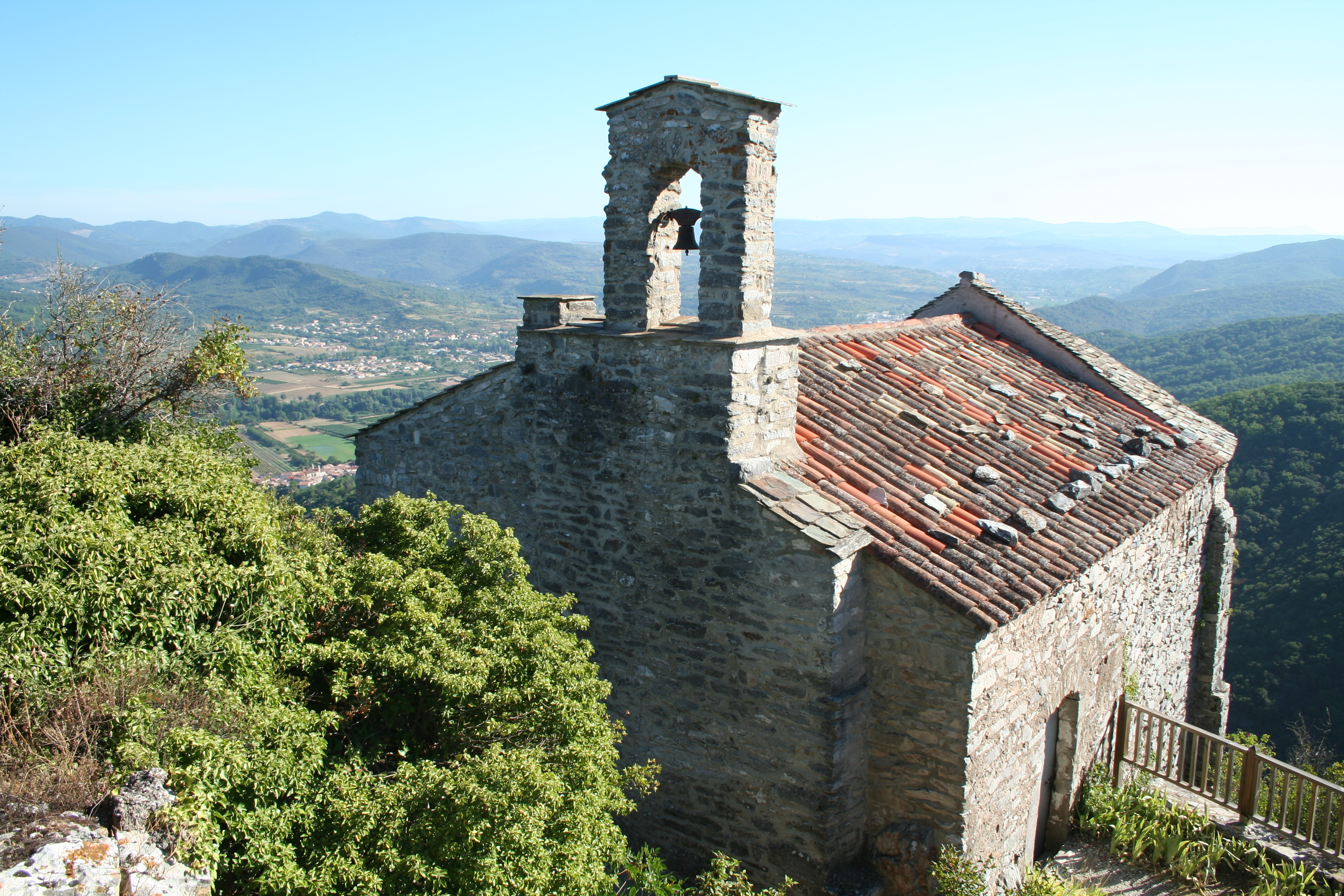
- Chapel St-Michel

- Coat of arms
- Location of Les Aires
- Location within France Location within Occitanie
- Coordinates: 43°34′57″N 3°06′16″E
- Country: France
- Region: Occitania
- Department: Hérault
- Arrondissement: Béziers
- Canton: Clermont-l'Hérault
- Intercommunality: Grand Orb

Government
  - Mayor (2024–2026): Jean-Michel Magnan
- Area^{1}: 20.54 km^{2} (7.93 sq mi)
- Elevation: 198 m (650 ft)
- Highest elevation: 640 m (2,100 ft)
- Lowest elevation: 149 m (489 ft)
- Population (2023): 618
  - Density: 30.1/km^{2} (77.9/sq mi)
- Time zone: UTC+01:00 (CET)
  - Summer (DST): UTC+02:00 (CEST)
- INSEE/Postal code: 34008 /34600
- ^{1} French Land Register data, which excludes lakes, ponds, glaciers > 1 km^{2} (0.386 sq mi or 247 acres) and river estuaries.

Les Aires (French pronunciation: [le.z‿ɛʁ]; Occitan: Las Airas) is a commune in the Hérault department in the Occitanie region in southern France.

== Geography ==
=== Climate ===
Les Aires has a mediterranean climate (Köppen climate classification Csa). The average annual temperature in Les Aires is 13.9 °C (57.0 °F). The average annual rainfall is 1,128.5 mm (44.43 in) with December as the wettest month. The temperatures are highest on average in July, at around 22.6 °C (72.7 °F), and lowest in January, at around 6.7 °C (44.1 °F). The highest temperature ever recorded in Les Aires was 41.3 °C (106.3 °F) on 28 June 2019; the coldest temperature ever recorded was −10.4 °C (13.3 °F) on 2 March 2005.

Climate data for Les Aires (1981–2010 averages, extremes 1995−present)
Month	Jan	Feb	Mar	Apr	May	Jun	Jul	Aug	Sep	Oct	Nov	Dec	Year
Record high °C (°F)	20.3 (68.5)	24.5 (76.1)	27.8 (82.0)	31.1 (88.0)	35.5 (95.9)	41.3 (106.3)	38.2 (100.8)	41.2 (106.2)	37.2 (99.0)	32.1 (89.8)	24.5 (76.1)	21.0 (69.8)	41.3 (106.3)
Mean daily maximum °C (°F)	10.8 (51.4)	12.1 (53.8)	15.3 (59.5)	18.1 (64.6)	22.2 (72.0)	27.1 (80.8)	29.7 (85.5)	29.1 (84.4)	24.4 (75.9)	19.7 (67.5)	14.1 (57.4)	10.8 (51.4)	19.5 (67.1)
Daily mean °C (°F)	6.7 (44.1)	7.2 (45.0)	9.8 (49.6)	12.4 (54.3)	16.1 (61.0)	20.2 (68.4)	22.6 (72.7)	22.2 (72.0)	18.0 (64.4)	14.9 (58.8)	9.7 (49.5)	6.6 (43.9)	13.9 (57.0)
Mean daily minimum °C (°F)	2.6 (36.7)	2.3 (36.1)	4.3 (39.7)	6.7 (44.1)	10.0 (50.0)	13.4 (56.1)	15.5 (59.9)	15.3 (59.5)	11.6 (52.9)	10.2 (50.4)	5.3 (41.5)	2.4 (36.3)	8.3 (46.9)
Record low °C (°F)	−10.0 (14.0)	−10.0 (14.0)	−10.4 (13.3)	−6.1 (21.0)	−1.6 (29.1)	4.0 (39.2)	6.7 (44.1)	5.6 (42.1)	2.2 (36.0)	−3.1 (26.4)	−9.4 (15.1)	−9.4 (15.1)	−10.4 (13.3)
Average precipitation mm (inches)	128.0 (5.04)	93.3 (3.67)	57.1 (2.25)	98.3 (3.87)	80.2 (3.16)	43.8 (1.72)	31.6 (1.24)	51.7 (2.04)	101.7 (4.00)	154.6 (6.09)	126.2 (4.97)	162.0 (6.38)	1,128.5 (44.43)
Average precipitation days (≥ 1.0 mm)	8.8	6.0	6.1	7.6	7.3	4.2	3.6	5.1	5.8	7.9	6.9	8.5	77.8
Source: Meteociel

== Sights ==
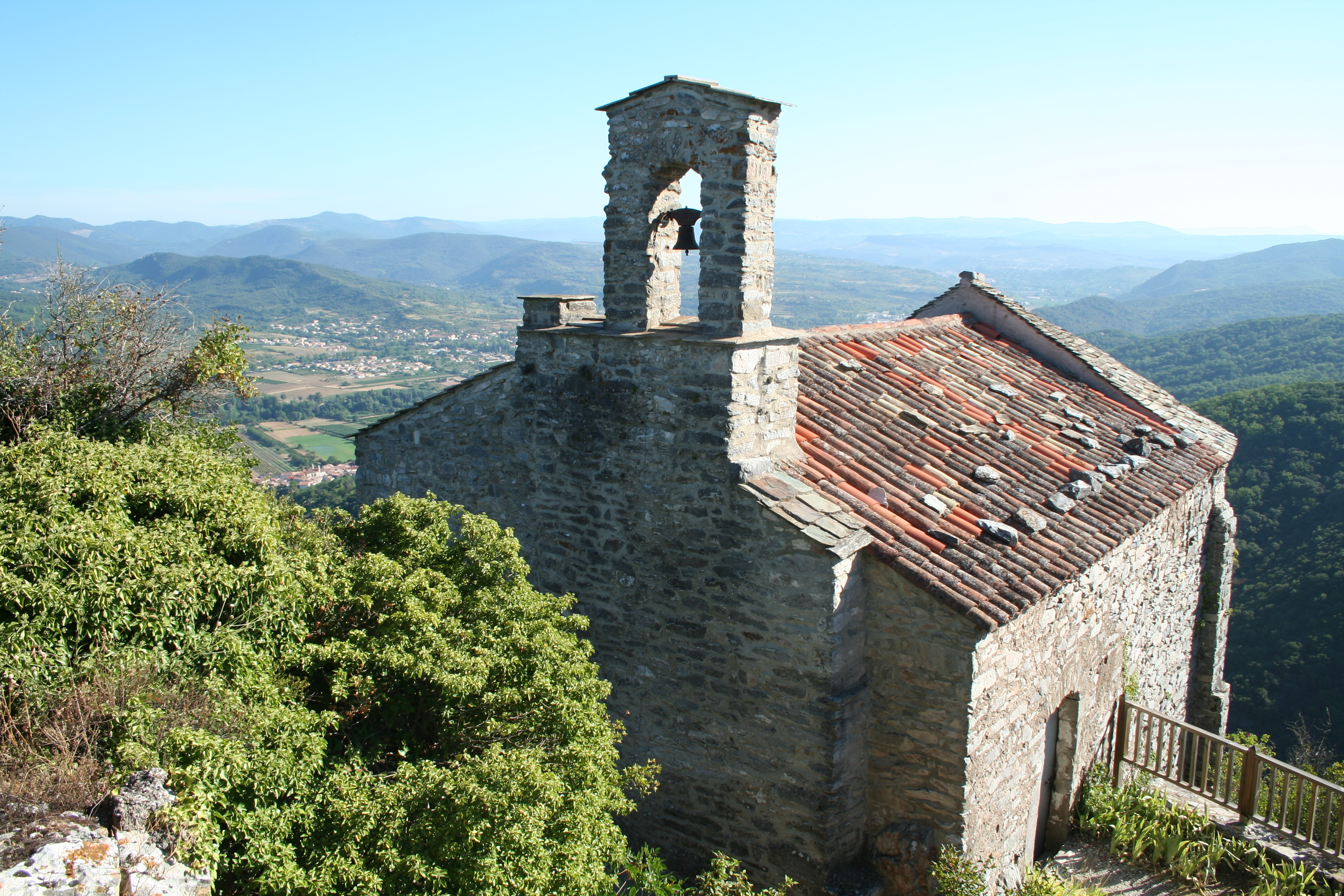
Chapelle Saint-Michel.

- Ruins of the château of Mourcairol.
- The castle chapel of Saint-Michel.
- Part of the ancient road between Béziers and Cahors.

== Population ==
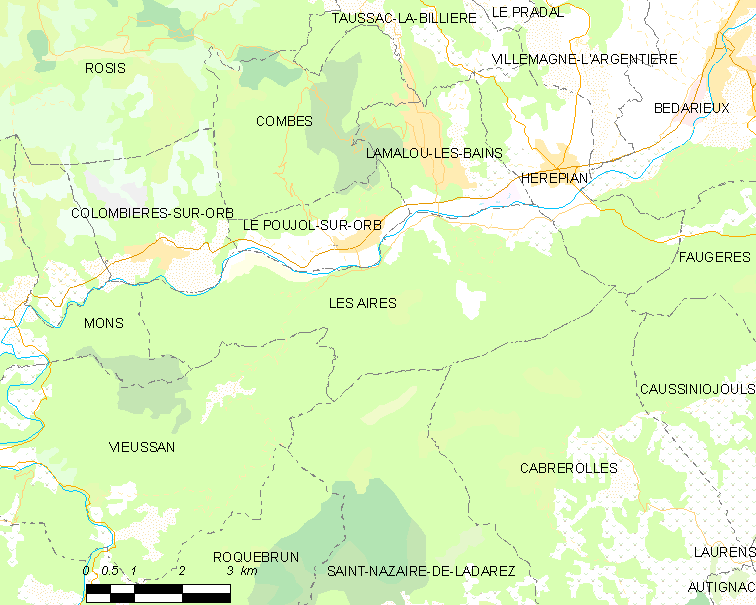
Map

Historical population
Year	Pop.	±% p.a.
1968	364	—
1975	361	−0.12%
1982	467	+3.75%
1990	537	+1.76%
1999	544	+0.14%
2007	559	+0.34%
2012	588	+1.02%
2017	608	+0.67%
2023	618	+0.27%
Source: INSEE

== See also ==
- Communes of the Hérault department
