= Ceilhes-et-Rocozels =

- Commune
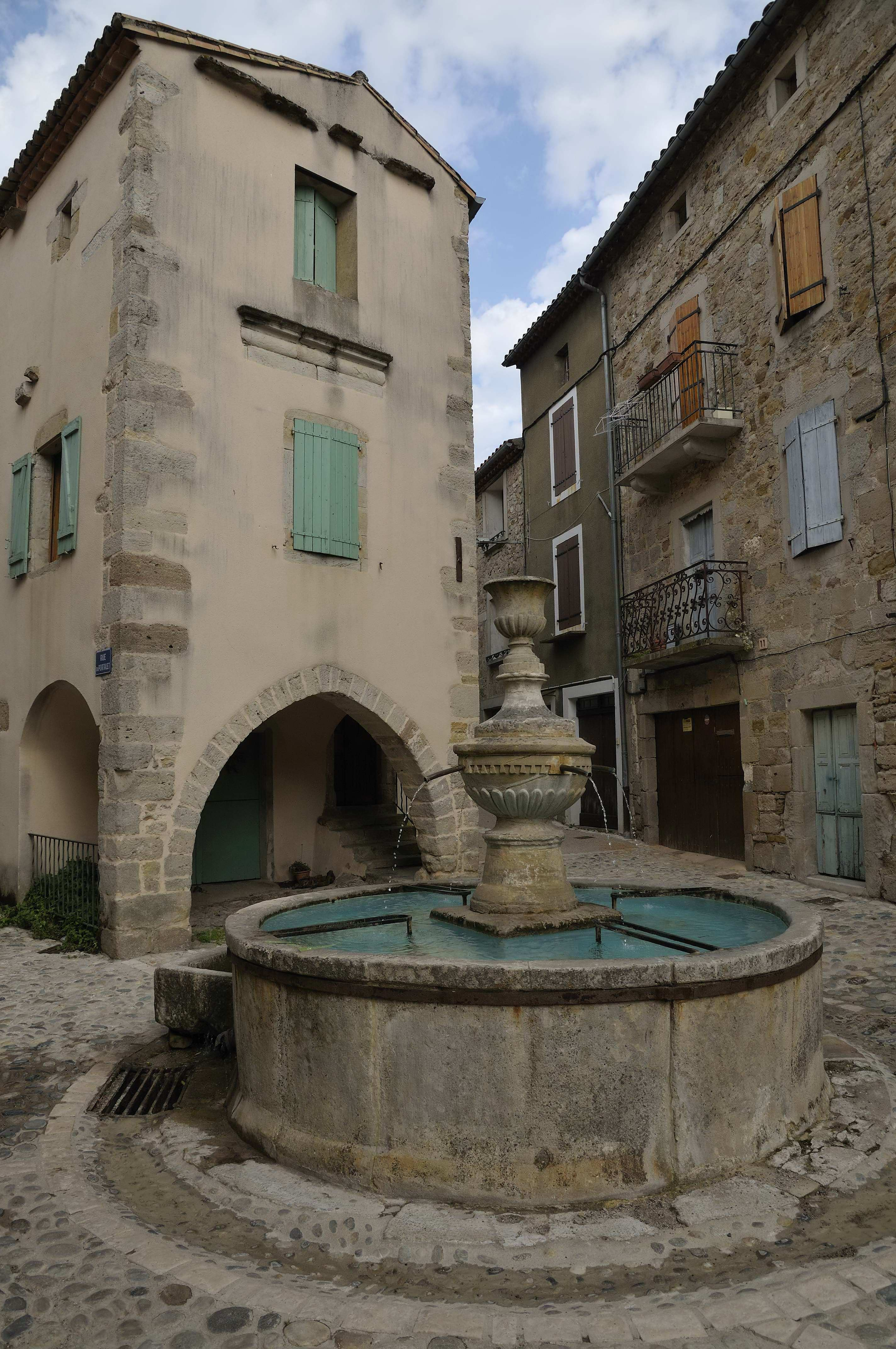
- Fountain

- Coat of arms
- Location of Ceilhes-et-Rocozels
- Location within France Location within Occitanie
- Coordinates: 43°48′16″N 3°06′41″E
- Country: France
- Region: Occitania
- Department: Hérault
- Arrondissement: Béziers
- Canton: Clermont-l'Hérault

Government
  - Mayor (2020–2026): Fabien Soulage
- Area^{1}: 27.82 km^{2} (10.74 sq mi)
- Highest elevation: 821 m (2,694 ft)
- Lowest elevation: 426 m (1,398 ft)
- Population (2023): 242
  - Density: 8.70/km^{2} (22.5/sq mi)
- Time zone: UTC+01:00 (CET)
  - Summer (DST): UTC+02:00 (CEST)
- INSEE/Postal code: 34071 /34260
- ^{1} French Land Register data, which excludes lakes, ponds, glaciers > 1 km^{2} (0.386 sq mi or 247 acres) and river estuaries.

Ceilhes-et-Rocozels (French pronunciation: [sɛj e ʁɔkɔzɛl]; Occitan: Selha e Rocosèls) is a commune in the Hérault department in southern France.

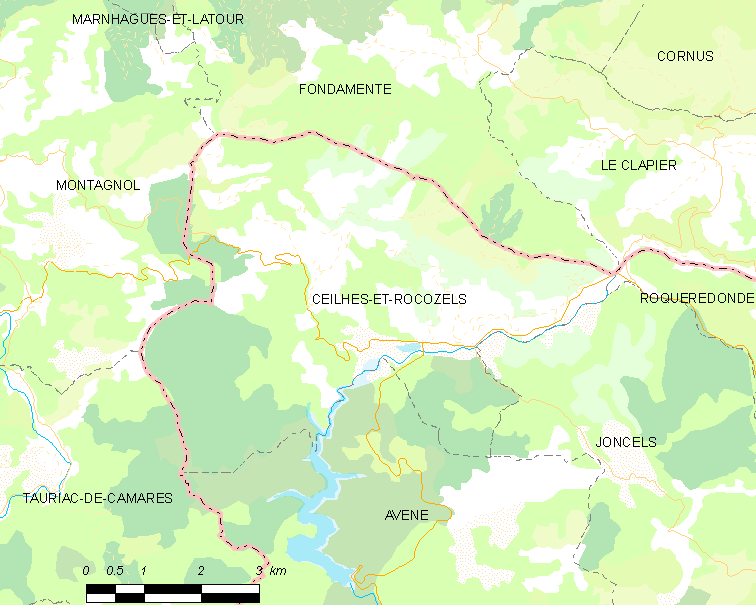
Map

== Politics ==
In March 1995, a nonparty left-wing mayor was elected, Ahmed Abdelkader. He was re-elected in March 2001, but was removed from office in December 2005 after a judicial condemnation. Jacques Cambon, the grandson of a former mayor was appointed interim mayor and elected as the permanent mayor in March 2008.

== Population ==
Historical population
Year	Pop.	±% p.a.
1968	397	—
1975	405	+0.29%
1982	358	−1.75%
1990	283	−2.90%
1999	256	−1.11%
2007	304	+2.17%
2012	307	+0.20%
2017	324	+1.08%
2023	242	−4.75%
Source: INSEE

== See also ==
- Communes of the Hérault department
