= Nébian =

- Commune
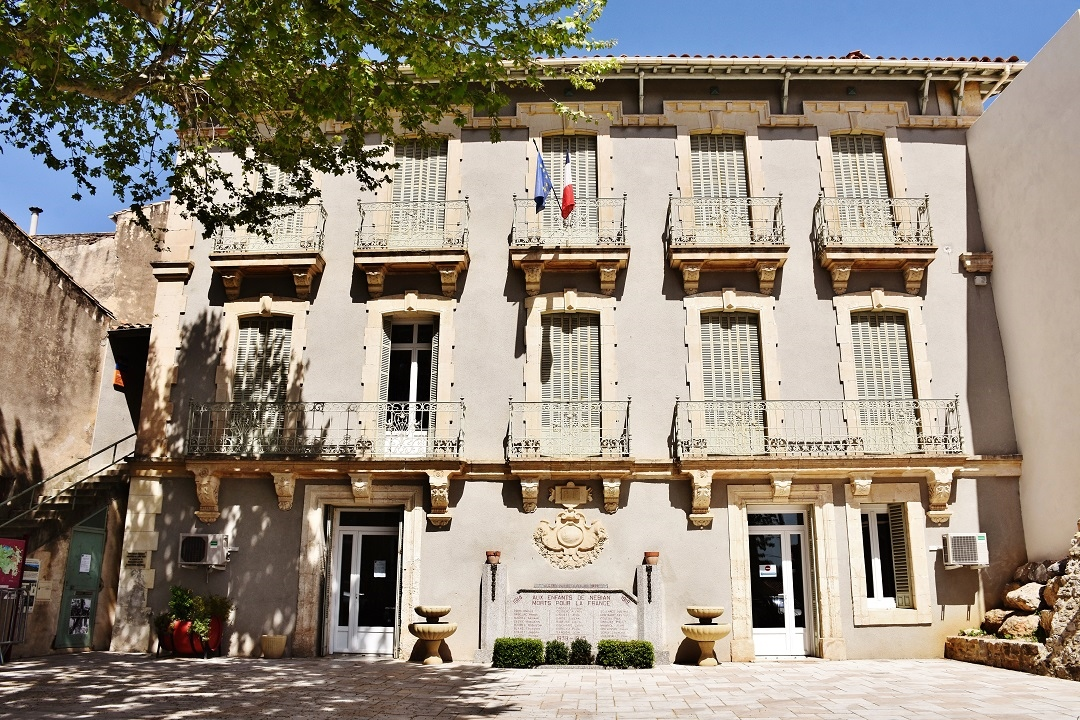
- Town hall

- Coat of arms
- Location of Nébian
- Location within France Location within Occitanie
- Coordinates: 43°36′26″N 3°25′57″E
- Country: France
- Region: Occitania
- Department: Hérault
- Arrondissement: Lodève
- Canton: Clermont-l'Hérault
- Intercommunality: Clermontais

Government
  - Mayor (2020–2026): Francis Bardeau
- Area^{1}: 9.79 km^{2} (3.78 sq mi)
- Elevation: 107 m (351 ft)
- Highest elevation: 289 m (948 ft)
- Lowest elevation: 39 m (128 ft)
- Population (2023): 1,634
  - Density: 167/km^{2} (432/sq mi)
- Time zone: UTC+01:00 (CET)
  - Summer (DST): UTC+02:00 (CEST)
- INSEE/Postal code: 34180 /34800
- ^{1} French Land Register data, which excludes lakes, ponds, glaciers > 1 km^{2} (0.386 sq mi or 247 acres) and river estuaries.

Nébian (French pronunciation: [nebjɑ̃]; Occitan: Nevian) is a commune in the Hérault department in the Occitanie region in southern France.

== Population ==
Historical population
Year	Pop.	±% p.a.
1968	854	—
1975	780	−1.29%
1982	772	−0.15%
1990	957	+2.72%
1999	1,026	+0.78%
2007	1,100	+0.87%
2012	1,358	+4.30%
2017	1,388	+0.44%
2023	1,634	+2.76%
Source: INSEE

== See also ==
- Communes of the Hérault department
