= Avène =

- Commune
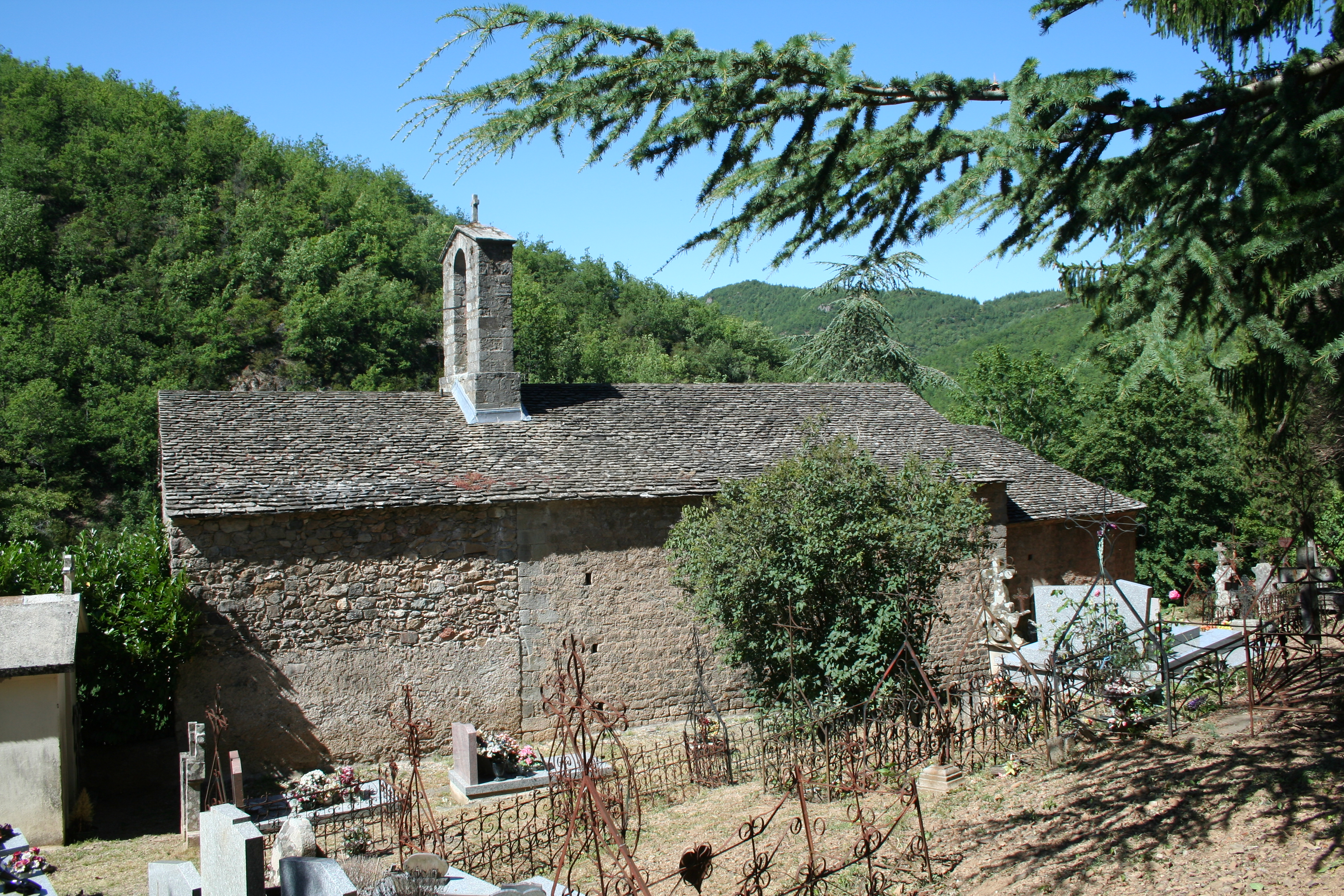
- Church St-Andre-Rieussec

- Coat of arms
- Location of Avène
- Location within France Location within Occitanie
- Coordinates: 43°45′29″N 3°06′00″E
- Country: France
- Region: Occitania
- Department: Hérault
- Arrondissement: Béziers
- Canton: Clermont-l'Hérault
- Intercommunality: Grand Orb

Government
  - Mayor (2020–2026): Serge Castan
- Area^{1}: 62.65 km^{2} (24.19 sq mi)
- Elevation: 330 m (1,080 ft)
- Highest elevation: 978 m (3,209 ft)
- Lowest elevation: 294 m (965 ft)
- Population (2023): 294
  - Density: 4.69/km^{2} (12.2/sq mi)
- Time zone: UTC+01:00 (CET)
  - Summer (DST): UTC+02:00 (CEST)
- INSEE/Postal code: 34019 /34260
- ^{1} French Land Register data, which excludes lakes, ponds, glaciers > 1 km^{2} (0.386 sq mi or 247 acres) and river estuaries.

Avène (French pronunciation: [avɛn]; Languedocien: Avèna) is a commune in the Hérault department in the Occitanie region in southern France.

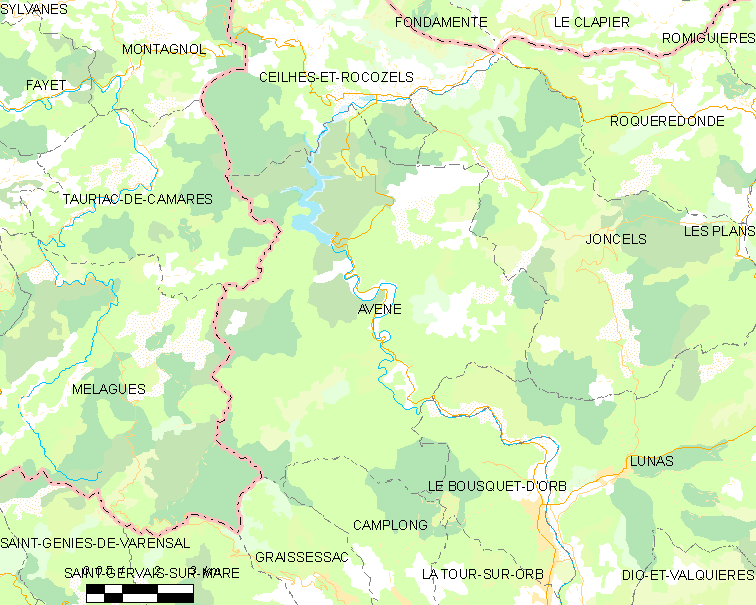
Map

== Population ==
Historical population
| Year | Pop. | ±% p.a. |
|---|---|---|
| 1968 | 457 | — |
| 1975 | 430 | −0.87% |
| 1982 | 259 | −6.99% |
| 1990 | 269 | +0.47% |
| 1999 | 275 | +0.25% |
| 2007 | 293 | +0.80% |
| 2012 | 308 | +1.00% |
| 2017 | 287 | −1.40% |
| 2023 | 294 | +0.40% |
Source: INSEE

== Avène Thermal Spring Water ==
A Hydrotherapy Centre was built near the Sainte-Odile spring in 1743, and focuses on using the purported therapeutic properties of Avène Thermal Spring Water to address a variety of dermatological conditions and skin concerns such as atopic dermatitis, psoriasis, eczema and burns.

The brand is centered on Avène Thermal spring water. Precipitation filters through the Cévennes Mountains and resurfaces at the Sainte-Odile spring. Its composition is thought to make it effective for the care and management of sensitive skin. Over 150 stringent biological, pharmacological and clinical studies on Avène Thermal Spring Water have been conducted by the Avene Thermal Spring Company and independent researchers.

== Sights ==
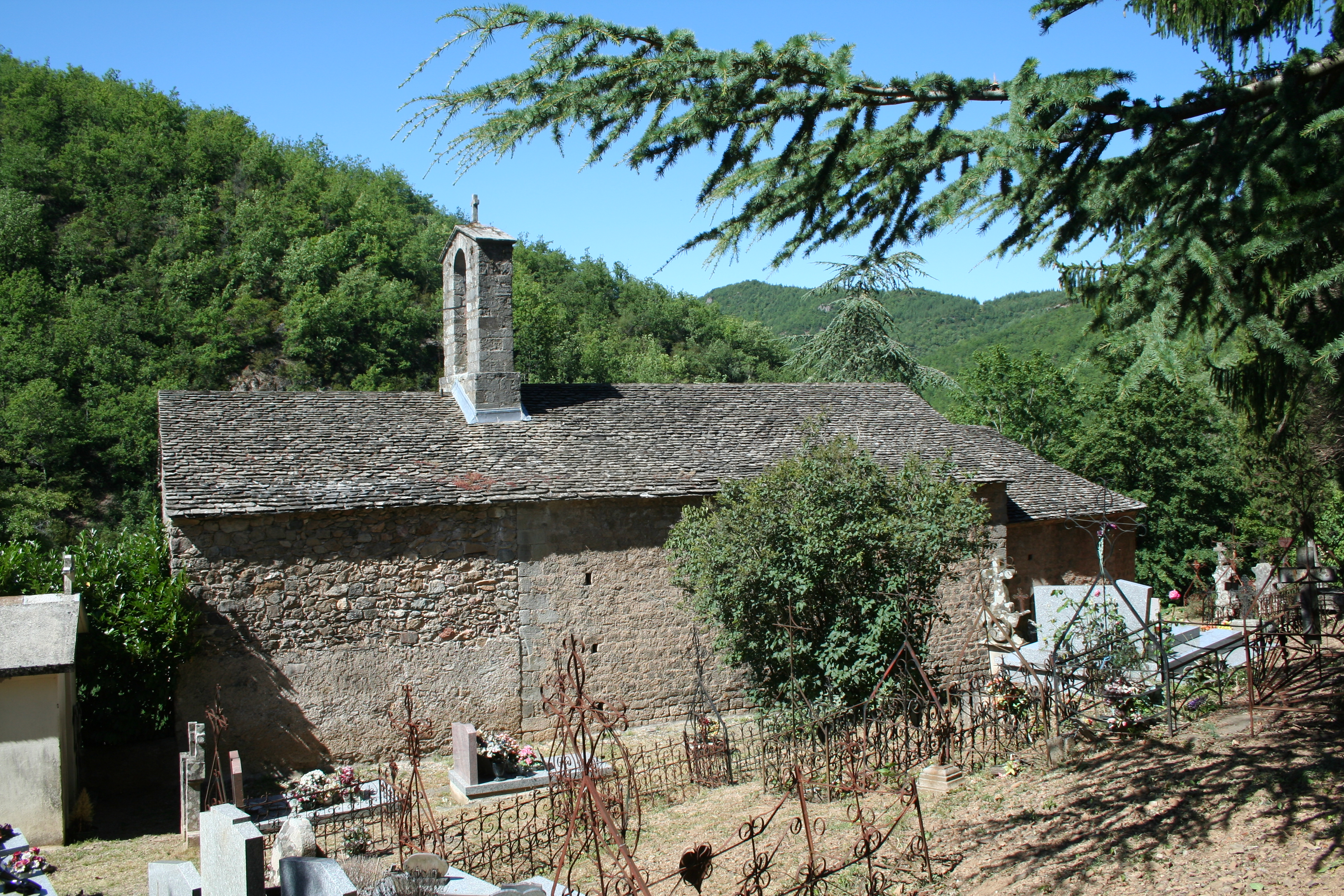
Saint-André-de-Rieussec

- Roman church of Saint-André-de-Rieussec 13th century.
- Church of Saint-Pierre de Rouvignac 12th century.
- Church of Sainte-Marie de Vinas 12th century.
- Church of Saint-Antoine de Serviès (1715).
- Saint-Barthélémy Church (1135).
- Truscas Church 19th century.
- Saint-Martin d'Avène church (modern).
- 13th century bridge over the Orb.

== See also ==
- Communes of the Hérault department
