= Carlencas-et-Levas =

- Commune
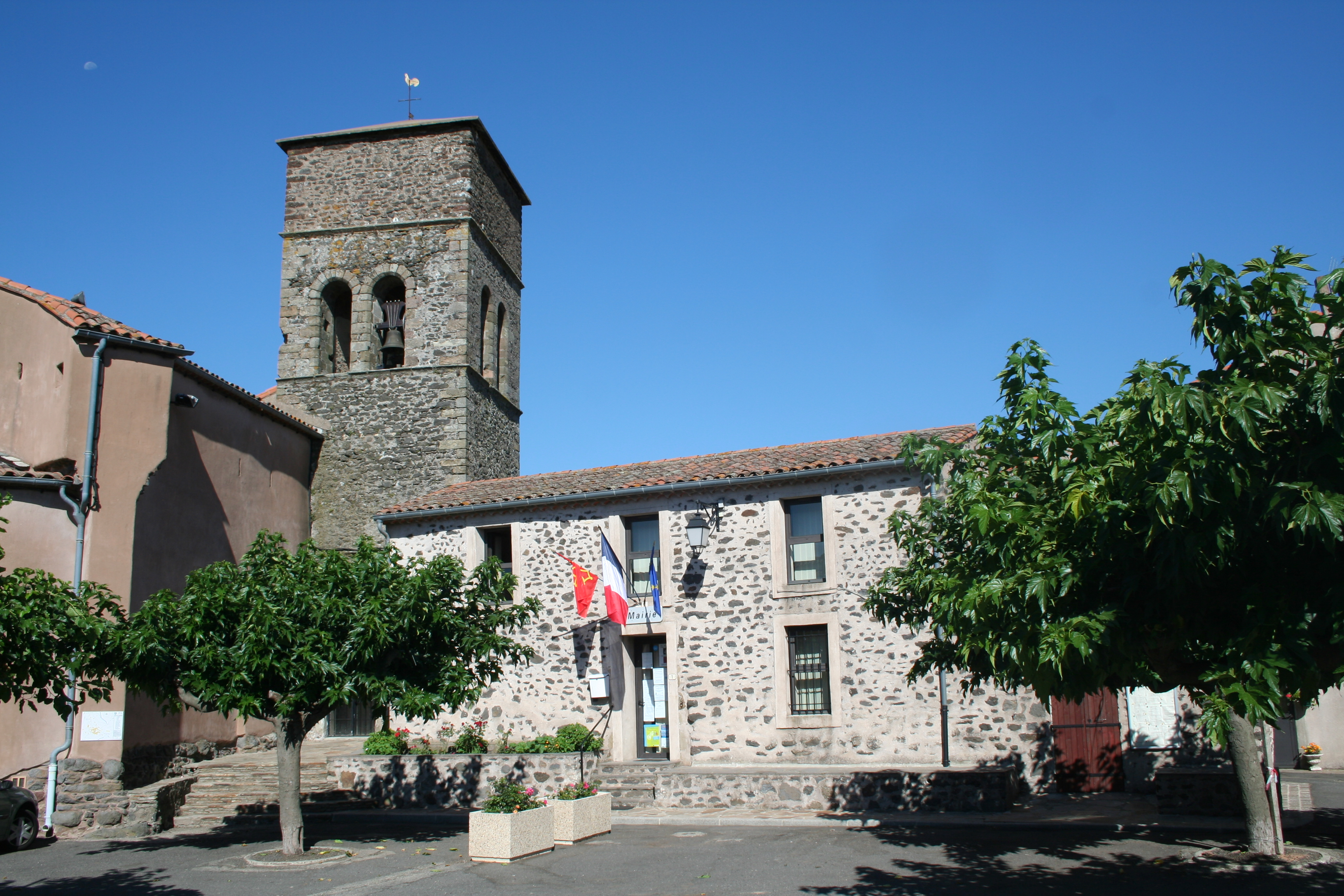
- Church St-Martin and town hall

- Coat of arms
- Location of Carlencas-et-Levas
- Location within France Location within Occitanie
- Coordinates: 43°38′01″N 3°13′33″E
- Country: France
- Region: Occitania
- Department: Hérault
- Arrondissement: Béziers
- Canton: Clermont-l'Hérault

Government
  - Mayor (2020–2026): Sylvie Toluafe
- Area^{1}: 10.78 km^{2} (4.16 sq mi)
- Elevation: 495 m (1,624 ft)
- Highest elevation: 491 m (1,611 ft)
- Lowest elevation: 277 m (909 ft)
- Population (2023): 110
  - Density: 10/km^{2} (26/sq mi)
- Time zone: UTC+01:00 (CET)
  - Summer (DST): UTC+02:00 (CEST)
- INSEE/Postal code: 34053 /34600
- ^{1} French Land Register data, which excludes lakes, ponds, glaciers > 1 km^{2} (0.386 sq mi or 247 acres) and river estuaries.

Carlencas-et-Levas is a commune in the Hérault department in southern France.

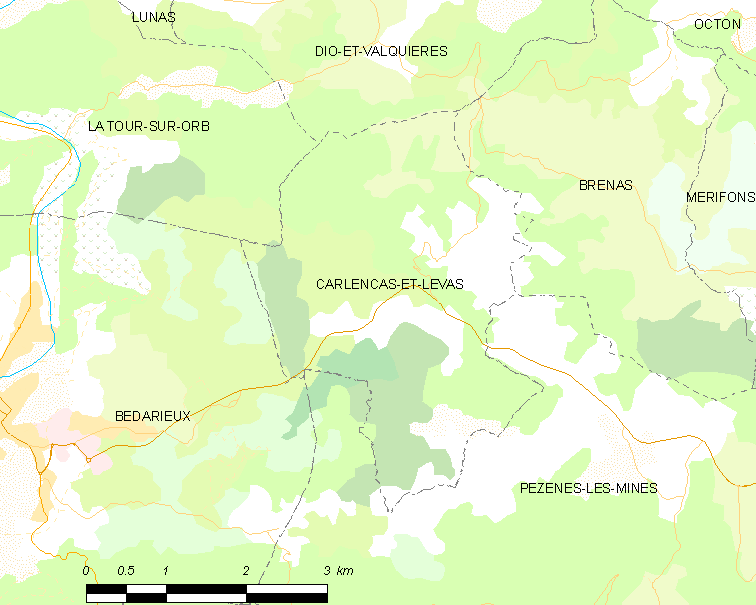
Map

== Monument ==
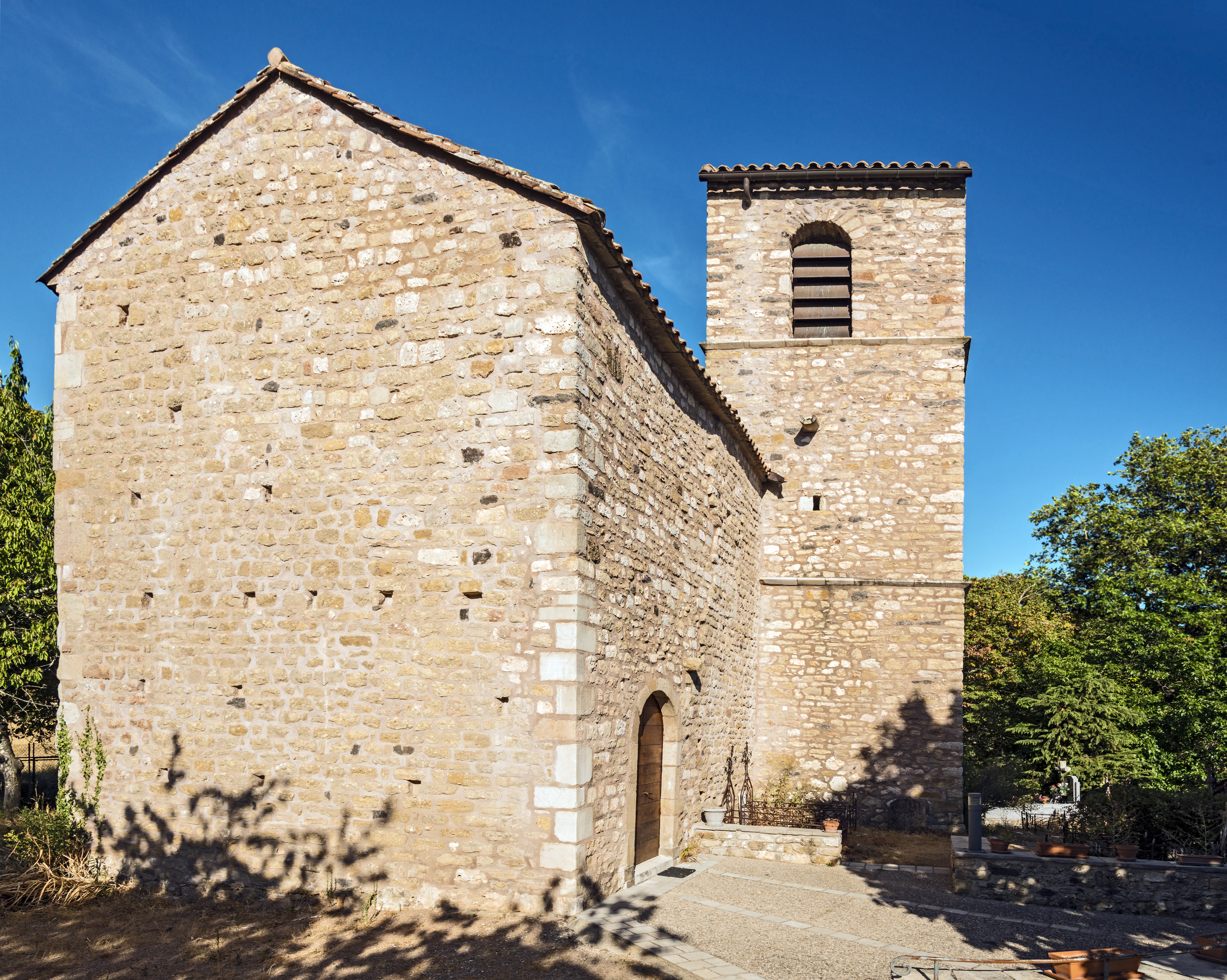
The chapel of Levas.

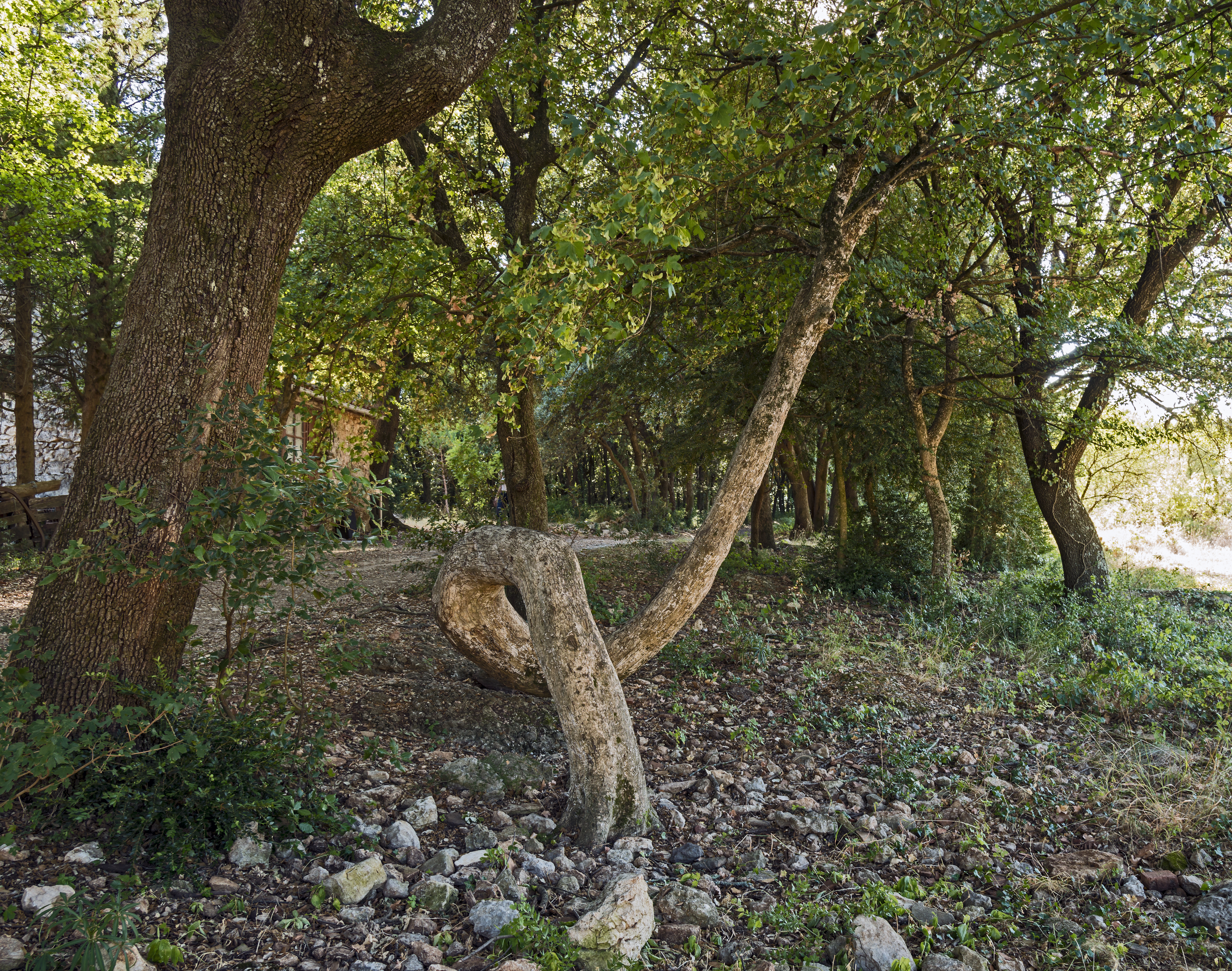
The crooked tree of the chapel.

== Population ==
Historical population
Year	Pop.	±% p.a.
1968	49	—
1975	54	+1.40%
1982	68	+3.35%
1990	87	+3.13%
1999	88	+0.13%
2007	116	+3.51%
2012	130	+2.31%
2017	130	+0.00%
2023	110	−2.75%
Source: INSEE

== See also ==
- Communes of the Hérault department
