= Graissessac =

- Commune
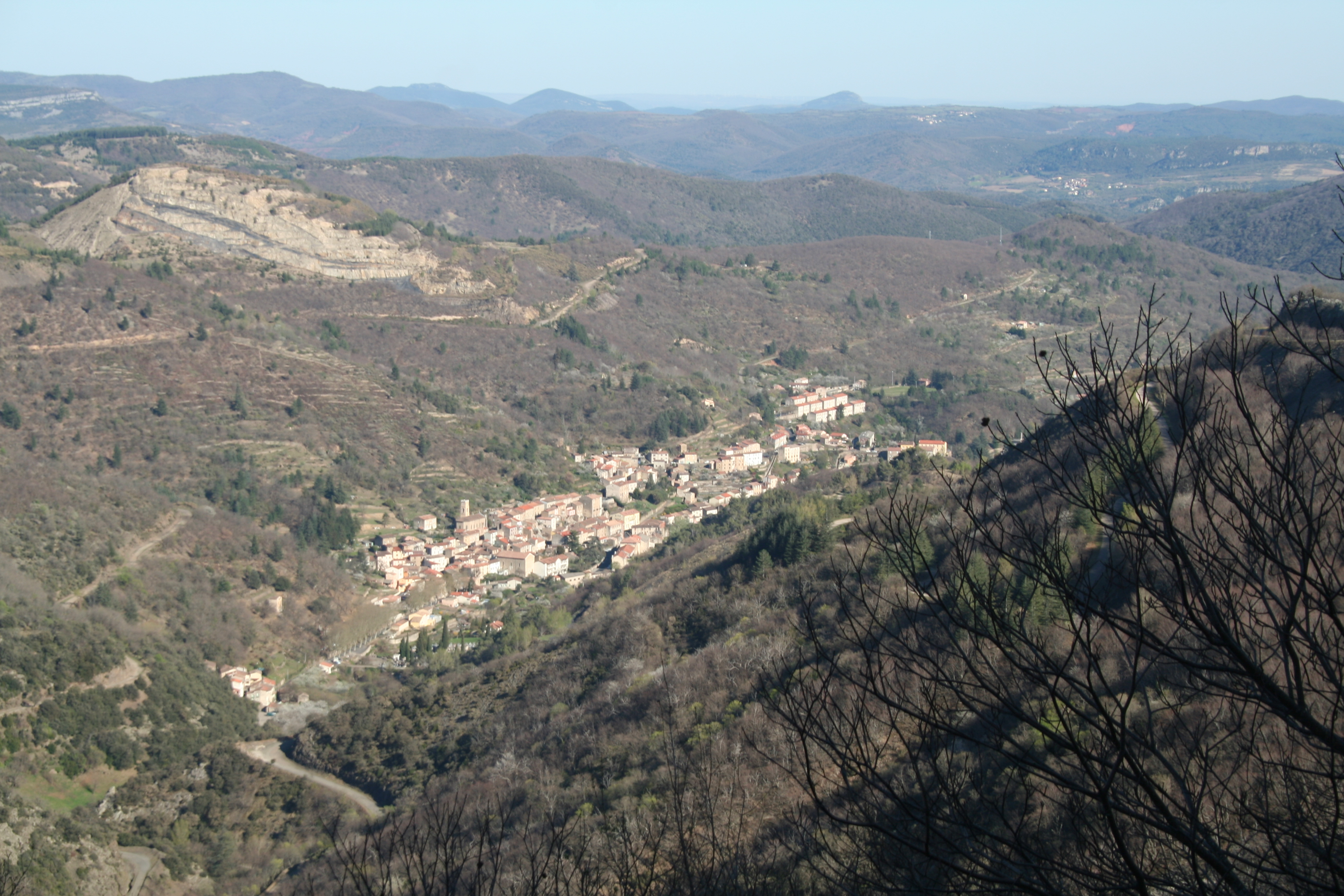
- Graissessac seen from the Col du Layrac

- Coat of arms
- Location of Graissessac
- Location within France Location within Occitanie
- Coordinates: 43°40′54″N 3°05′36″E
- Country: France
- Region: Occitania
- Department: Hérault
- Arrondissement: Béziers
- Canton: Clermont-l'Hérault

Government
  - Mayor (2020–2026): Mariette Combes
- Area^{1}: 10.03 km^{2} (3.87 sq mi)
- Elevation: 1,000 m (3,300 ft)
- Highest elevation: 1,001 m (3,284 ft)
- Lowest elevation: 270 m (890 ft)
- Population (2023): 554
  - Density: 55.2/km^{2} (143/sq mi)
- Time zone: UTC+01:00 (CET)
  - Summer (DST): UTC+02:00 (CEST)
- INSEE/Postal code: 34117 /34260
- ^{1} French Land Register data, which excludes lakes, ponds, glaciers > 1 km^{2} (0.386 sq mi or 247 acres) and river estuaries.

Graissessac (French pronunciation: [ɡʁɛsəsak]; Occitan: Graisseçac) is a commune in the southern French department of Hérault.

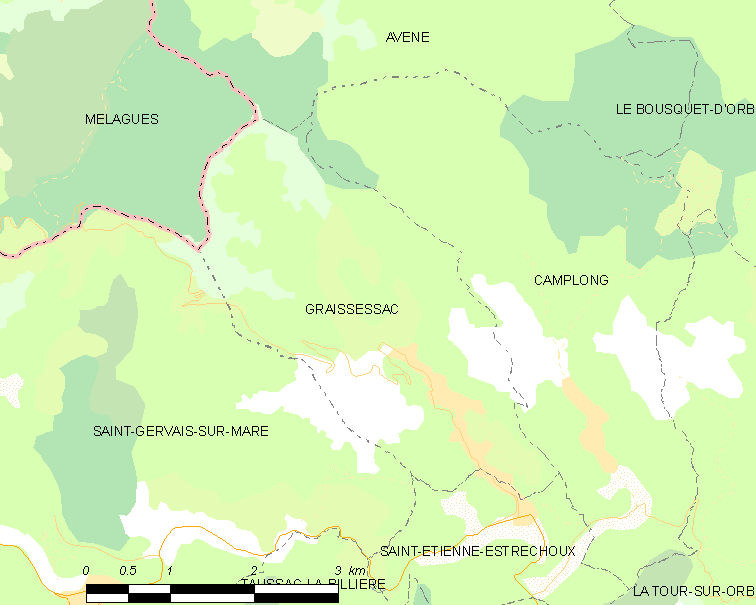
Map

== Population ==
Historical population
Year	Pop.	±% p.a.
1968	1,510	—
1975	1,134	−4.01%
1982	924	−2.88%
1990	687	−3.64%
1999	632	−0.92%
2007	682	+0.96%
2012	717	+1.01%
2017	654	−1.82%
2023	554	−2.73%
Source: INSEE

== See also ==
- Communes of the Hérault department
