= Camplong =

- Commune
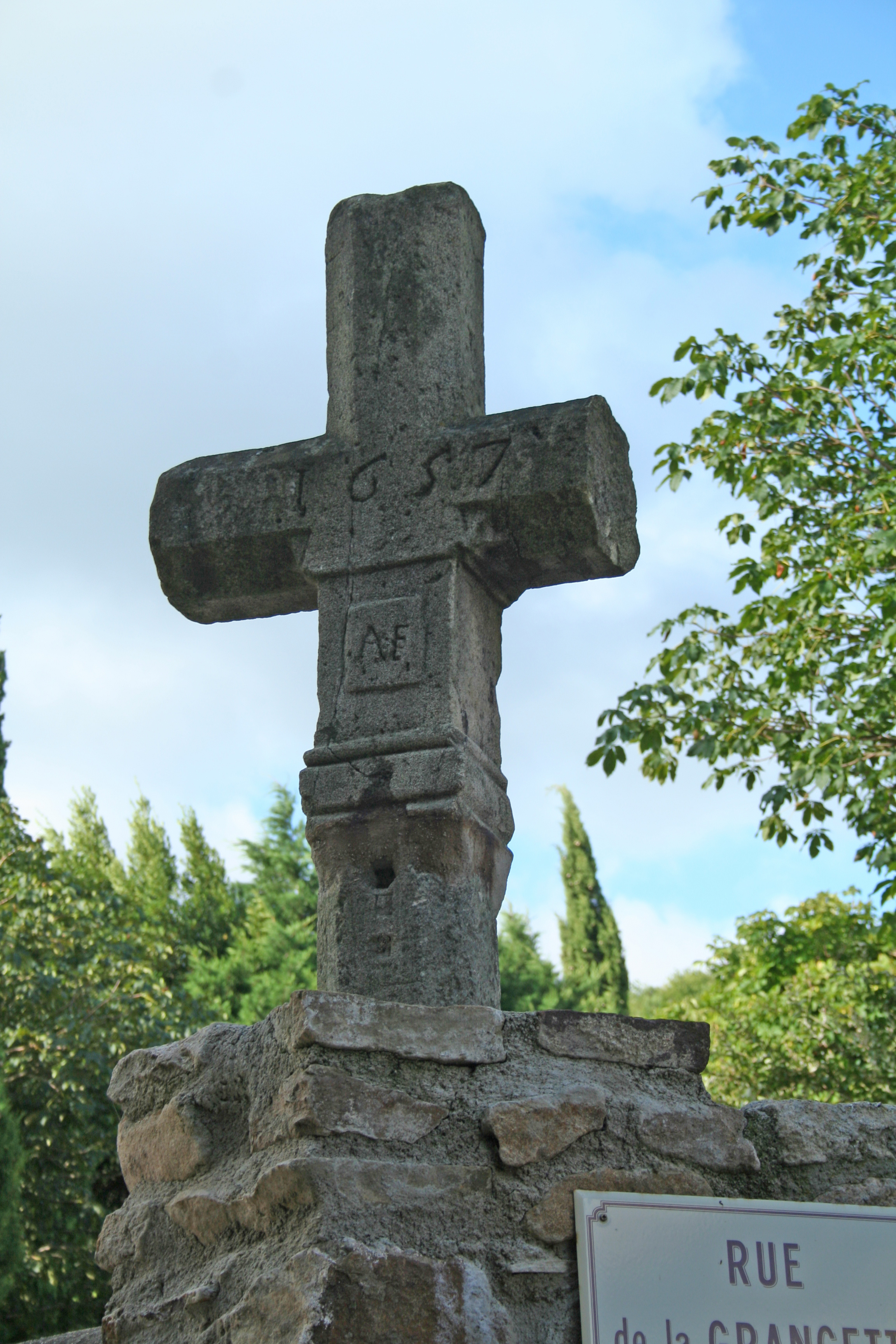
- The cross of 1657
- Location of Camplong
- Location within France Location within Occitanie
- Coordinates: 43°40′25″N 3°07′09″E
- Country: France
- Region: Occitania
- Department: Hérault
- Arrondissement: Béziers
- Canton: Clermont-l'Hérault

Government
  - Mayor (2020–2026): Bernard Coste
- Area^{1}: 13.25 km^{2} (5.12 sq mi)
- Elevation: 247 m (810 ft)
- Highest elevation: 882 m (2,894 ft)
- Lowest elevation: 264 m (866 ft)
- Population (2023): 212
  - Density: 16.0/km^{2} (41.4/sq mi)
- Time zone: UTC+01:00 (CET)
  - Summer (DST): UTC+02:00 (CEST)
- INSEE/Postal code: 34049 /34260
- ^{1} French Land Register data, which excludes lakes, ponds, glaciers > 1 km^{2} (0.386 sq mi or 247 acres) and river estuaries.

Camplong (French pronunciation: [kɑ̃plɔ̃]) is a commune in the Hérault department in southern France.

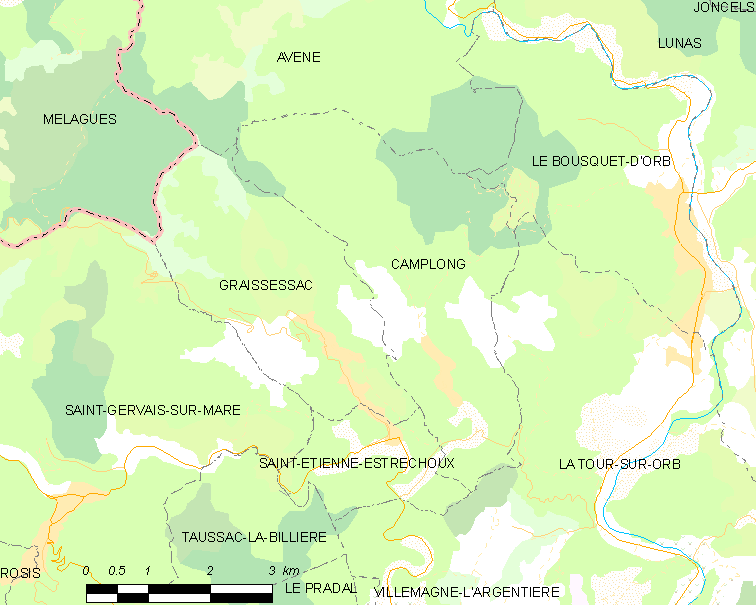
Map

== Personalities ==
- Ferdinand Fabre spent part of his youth at the house of his uncle, who was curate of the parish.

== Population ==
Historical population
| Year | Pop. | ±% p.a. |
|---|---|---|
| 1968 | 348 | — |
| 1975 | 305 | −1.87% |
| 1982 | 251 | −2.75% |
| 1990 | 241 | −0.51% |
| 1999 | 187 | −2.78% |
| 2007 | 234 | +2.84% |
| 2012 | 242 | +0.67% |
| 2017 | 234 | −0.67% |
| 2023 | 212 | −1.63% |
Source: INSEE

== See also ==
- Communes of the Hérault department
