= Saint-Étienne-Estréchoux =

- Commune
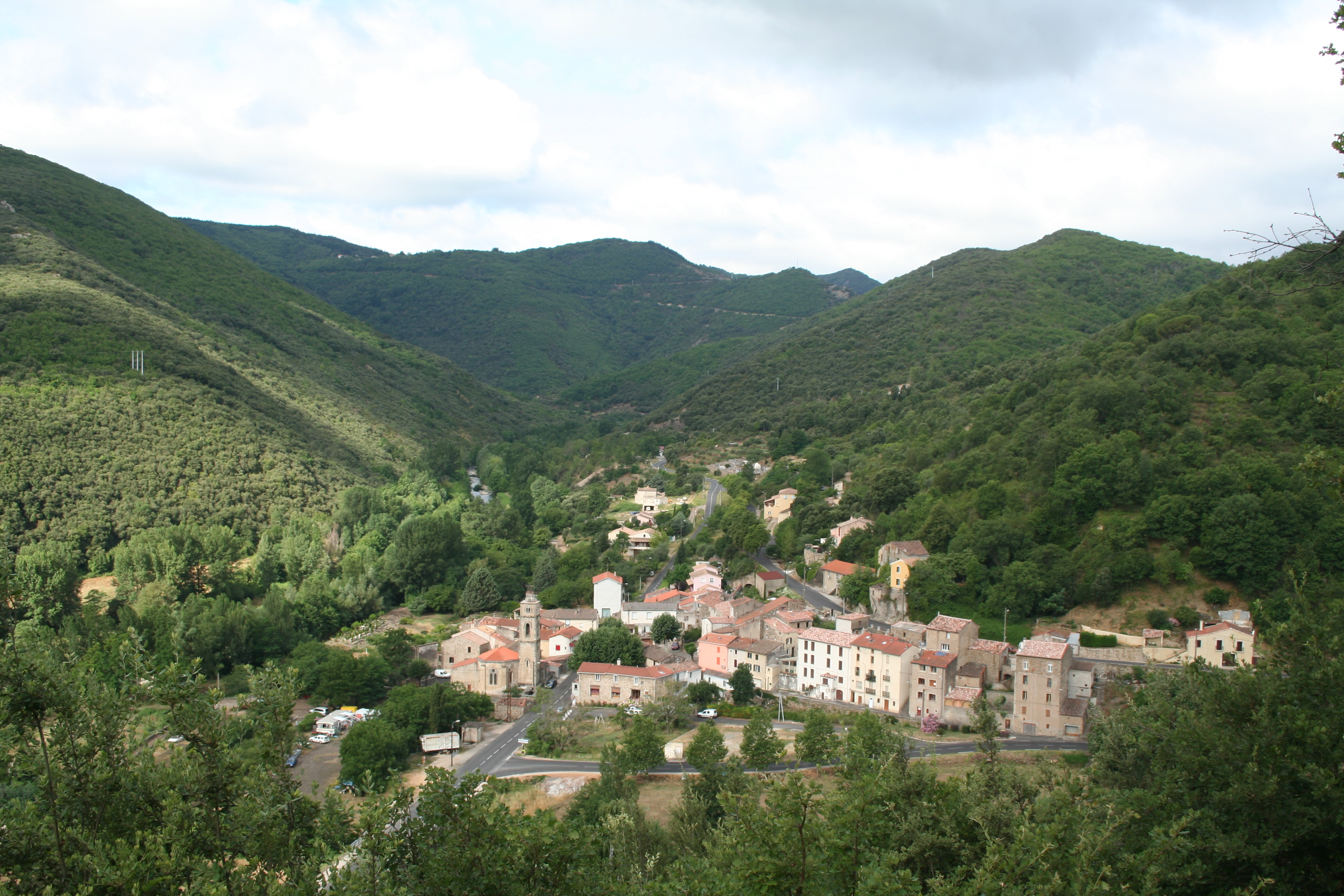
- A general view of Saint-Étienne-Estréchoux

- Coat of arms
- Location of Saint-Étienne-Estréchoux
- Location within France Location within Occitanie
- Coordinates: 43°40′07″N 3°06′16″E
- Country: France
- Region: Occitania
- Department: Hérault
- Arrondissement: Béziers
- Canton: Clermont-l'Hérault

Government
  - Mayor (2020–2026): Henri Mathieu
- Area^{1}: 3.58 km^{2} (1.38 sq mi)
- Elevation: 280 m (920 ft)
- Highest elevation: 594 m (1,949 ft)
- Lowest elevation: 255 m (837 ft)
- Population (2023): 259
  - Density: 72.3/km^{2} (187/sq mi)
- Time zone: UTC+01:00 (CET)
  - Summer (DST): UTC+02:00 (CEST)
- INSEE/Postal code: 34252 /34260
- ^{1} French Land Register data, which excludes lakes, ponds, glaciers > 1 km^{2} (0.386 sq mi or 247 acres) and river estuaries.

Saint-Étienne-Estréchoux (Languedocien: Sant Estève d'Estrechós) is a commune in the Hérault department in the Occitanie region in southern France.

== Population ==
Historical population
Year	Pop.	±% p.a.
1968	502	—
1975	405	−3.02%
1982	354	−1.90%
1990	291	−2.42%
1999	262	−1.16%
2007	246	−0.78%
2012	262	+1.27%
2017	260	−0.15%
2023	259	−0.06%
Source: INSEE

== See also ==
- Communes of the Hérault department
