= La Tour-sur-Orb =

- Commune
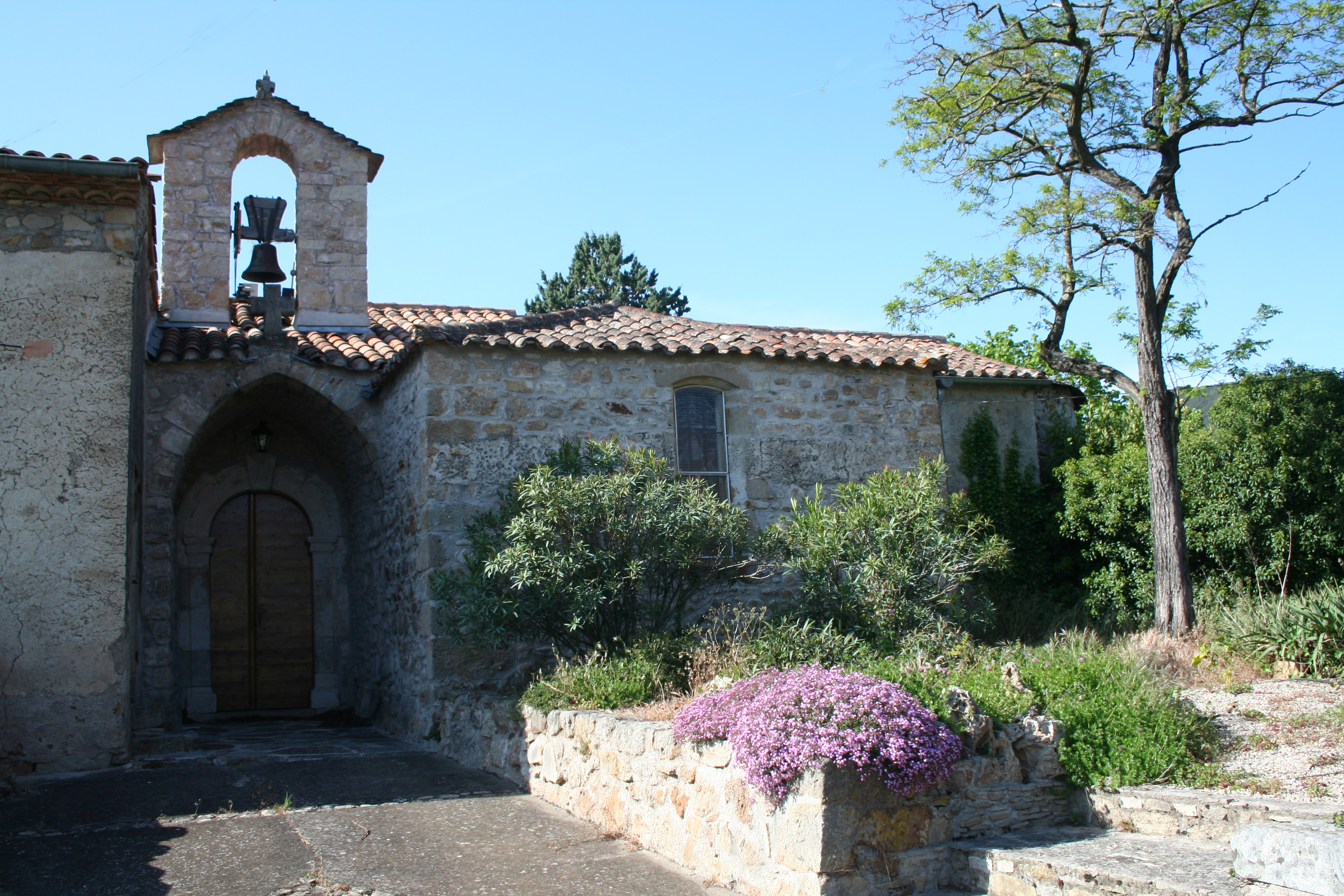
- The church of La Tour-sur-Orb

- Coat of arms
- Location of La Tour-sur-Orb
- Location within France Location within Occitanie
- Coordinates: 43°39′15″N 3°08′59″E
- Country: France
- Region: Occitania
- Department: Hérault
- Arrondissement: Béziers
- Canton: Clermont-l'Hérault
- Intercommunality: Grand Orb

Government
  - Mayor (2020–2026): Bernard Sallettes
- Area^{1}: 30.65 km^{2} (11.83 sq mi)
- Elevation: 228 m (748 ft)
- Highest elevation: 745 m (2,444 ft)
- Lowest elevation: 204 m (669 ft)
- Population (2023): 1,350
  - Density: 44.0/km^{2} (114/sq mi)
- Time zone: UTC+01:00 (CET)
  - Summer (DST): UTC+02:00 (CEST)
- INSEE/Postal code: 34312 /34260
- ^{1} French Land Register data, which excludes lakes, ponds, glaciers > 1 km^{2} (0.386 sq mi or 247 acres) and river estuaries.

La Tour-sur-Orb (French pronunciation: [la tuʁ syʁ ɔʁb]; Occitan: La Torre d'Òrb) is a commune in the Hérault department in the Occitanie region in southern France.

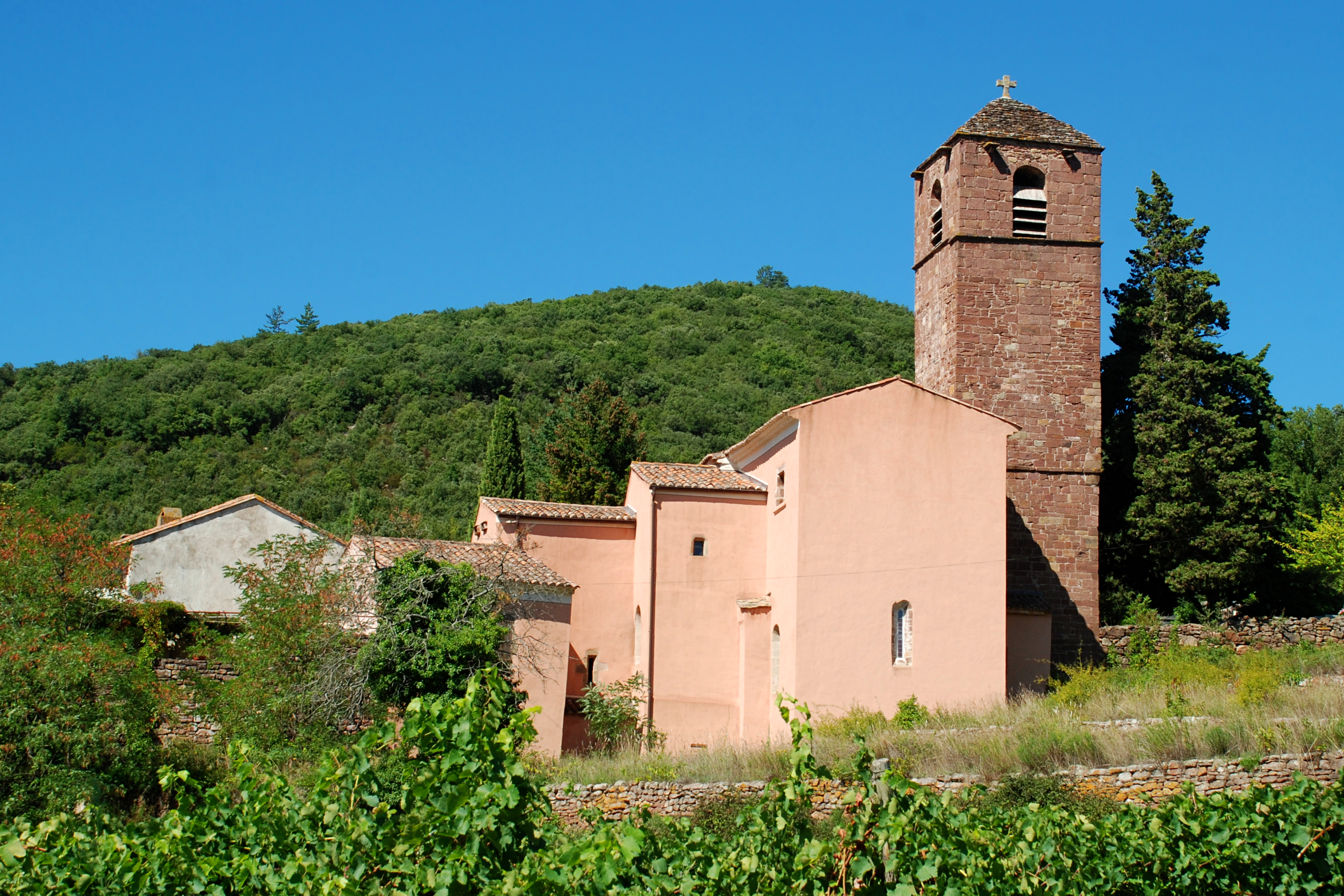
Église Saint-Cyr et Sainte-Julite de Saint-Xist

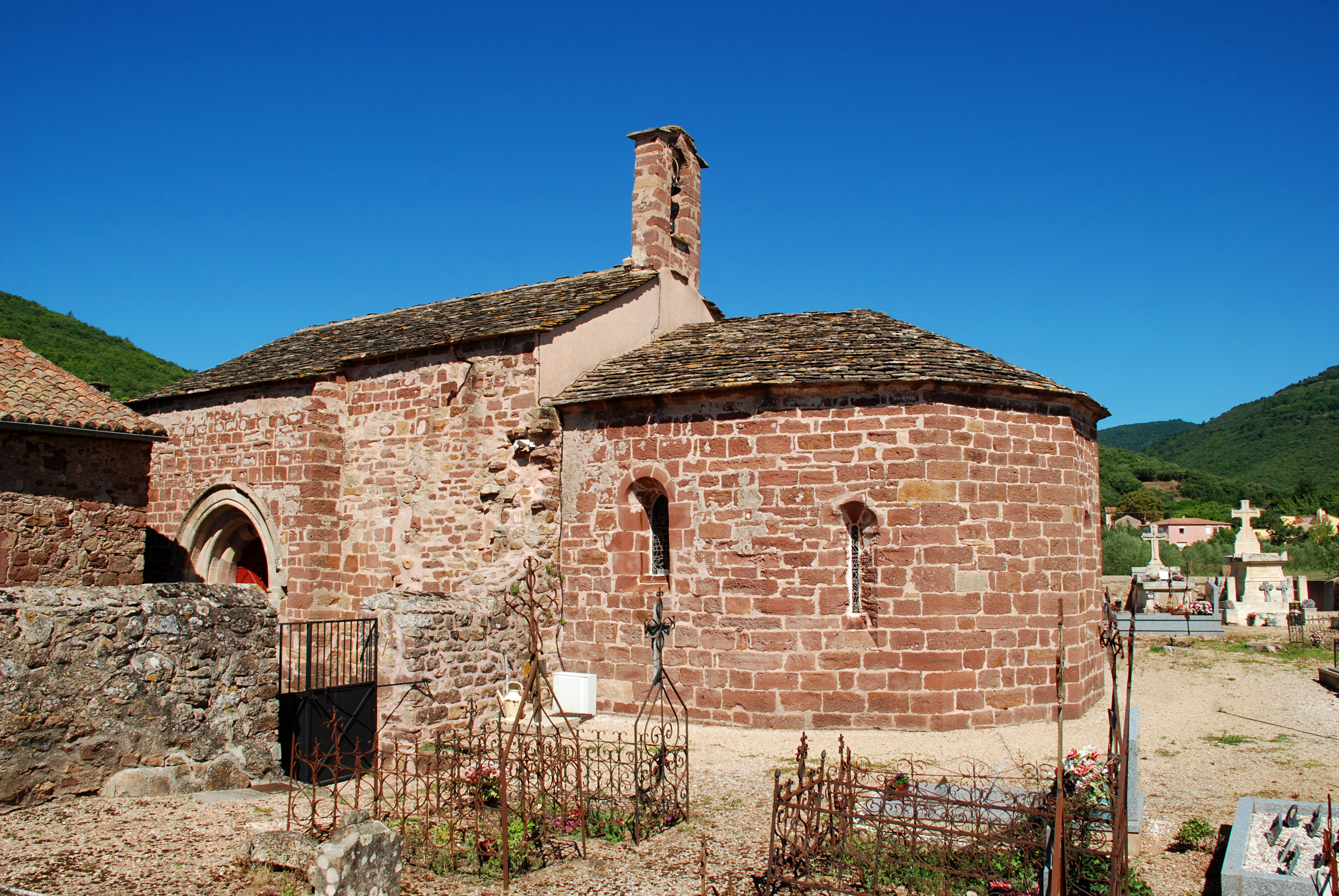
Église Sainte-Marie de Frangouille

== Population ==
Historical population
Year	Pop.	±% p.a.
1968	758	—
1975	812	+0.99%
1982	1,031	+3.47%
1990	1,039	+0.10%
1999	1,050	+0.12%
2007	1,170	+1.36%
2012	1,267	+1.61%
2017	1,273	+0.09%
2023	1,350	+0.98%
Source: INSEE

== See also ==
- Communes of the Hérault department
