= Le Pradal =

- Commune
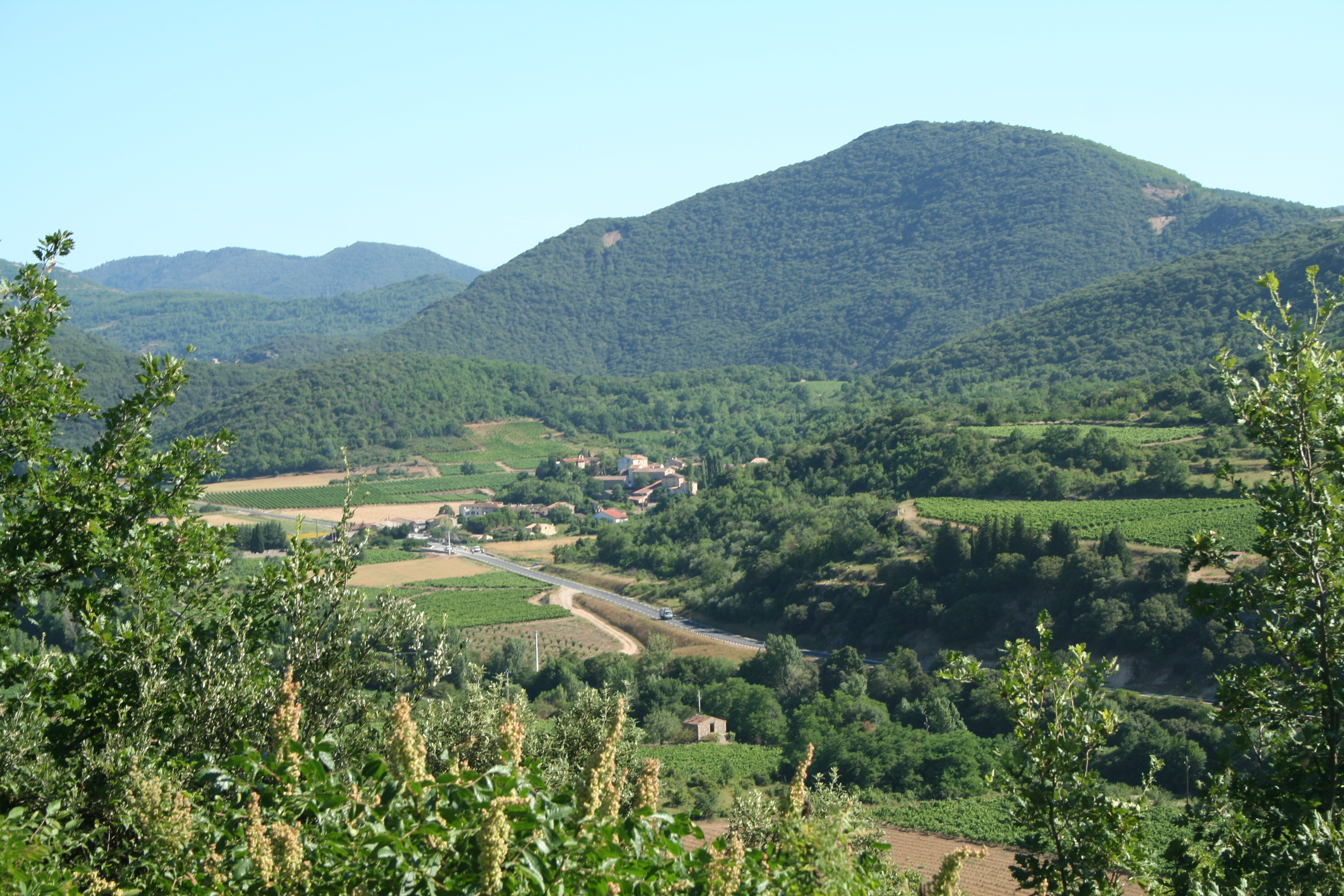
- The landscape of Le Pradal

- Coat of arms
- Location of Le Pradal
- Location within France Location within Occitanie
- Coordinates: 43°37′42″N 3°06′18″E
- Country: France
- Region: Occitania
- Department: Hérault
- Arrondissement: Béziers
- Canton: Clermont-l'Hérault

Government
  - Mayor (2020–2026): Christian Biés
- Area^{1}: 3.8 km^{2} (1.5 sq mi)
- Elevation: 272 m (892 ft)
- Highest elevation: 662 m (2,172 ft)
- Lowest elevation: 236 m (774 ft)
- Population (2023): 319
  - Density: 84/km^{2} (220/sq mi)
- Time zone: UTC+01:00 (CET)
  - Summer (DST): UTC+02:00 (CEST)
- INSEE/Postal code: 34216 /34600
- ^{1} French Land Register data, which excludes lakes, ponds, glaciers > 1 km^{2} (0.386 sq mi or 247 acres) and river estuaries.

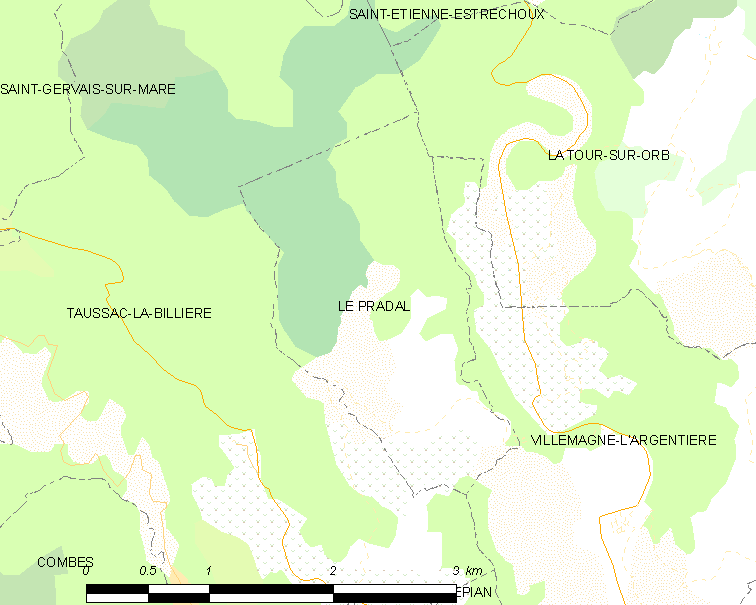
Carte

Le Pradal (French pronunciation: [lə pʁadal]; Occitan: Lo Pradal) is a commune in the Hérault department in the Occitanie region in southern France.

== Population ==
Historical population
| Year | Pop. | ±% p.a. |
|---|---|---|
| 1968 | 101 | — |
| 1975 | 97 | −0.58% |
| 1982 | 136 | +4.95% |
| 1990 | 178 | +3.42% |
| 1999 | 191 | +0.79% |
| 2007 | 260 | +3.93% |
| 2012 | 295 | +2.56% |
| 2017 | 332 | +2.39% |
| 2023 | 319 | −0.66% |
Source: INSEE

== See also ==
- Communes of the Hérault department
