= Terrasses du Larzac =

Terrasses du Larzac (French pronunciation: [teʁas dy laʁzak]) is an Appellation d’origine contrôlée (AOC) within the Côteaux du Languedoc in Southern France ( French Occitania ) created in 2005 for red wines made from Syrah, Grenache and Mourvèdre grapes, with the acceptable additions of Cinsaut and Carignan, and grown in some of the highest vineyards of the Côteaux du Languedoc on the slopes of the Cevennes.

The appellation includes St-Saturnin (cited by Jancis Robinson as, "one of the more exciting of the named crus within the Côteaux du Languedoc appellation including parts of St-Guiraud, Jonquières, and Arboras", and Montpeyroux (cited by Robinson as, "the highest named cru within the Côteaux du Languedoc in southern France and, with nearby Pic-St-Loup, the most exciting").

The Terrasses du Larzac region encompasses the villages of Aniane and Jonquières - respective homes of Mas de Daumas Gassac (1974) and Mas Jullien (1985) and site of the renaissance in Languedoc wine.

One of France’s most recent appellations (2005) it overlaps in parts with that of Roquefort, France’s oldest and the world’s first appellation (1925) in the villages of Pégairolles-de-l'Escalette and Octon. Here the grazing of Lacaune, Manech, and Basco-Béarnaise for the production of Roquefort occurs alongside the growing of Grenache, Syrah, and Mouvedre for Terrasses du Larzac wine.

== Production zone ==
The Terrasses de Larzac area is in the north of the Hérault department. It is in an asymmetrical V shape crossed by the north-south flowing river Hérault. The Causse du Larzac runs along the entire northern boundary. To the west it stretches along the Lergue river bed, whilst to the north-east it stretches along the sides of the Séranne mountains, along the Buèges valley. Mount Saint Baudille rises from the centre in the first foothills of the Larzac. At the foot of the Causse du Larzac there are a succession of old terraces at around 50 metres (165 ft) above the rivers Hérault and Lergue. Whereas some slopes which form a natural boundary for the Terrasses du Larzac do rise to over 800 metres (2650 ft), the areas under vines and classed as AOC Coteaux du Languedoc range from 50 – 300 metres (165 – 990 ft) up the slopes of the Causse and on the old terraces. The climate zone with the widest temperature variations in the region, it enjoys relatively cool summer nights thanks to its distance from the sea and proximity to the mountainous Causse. As a result the grapes mature slowly and steadily which is beneficial both to their colour and the wines’ aromatic qualities.

== Villages ==
Aniane, Arboras, Le Bosc, Brissac, Causse-de-la-Selle, Ceyras, Gignac (part), Jonquières, Lagamas, Lauroux, Mérifons, Montoulieu, Montpeyroux, Moulès-et-Baucels, Murles, Octon, Pégairolles-de-Buèges, Pégairolles-de-l'Escalette, Poujols, Puéchabon, Saint-André-de-Sangonis, Saint-André-de-Buèges, Saint-Félix-de-Lodez, Saint-Guiraud, Saint-Jean-de-Buèges, Saint-Jean-de-Fos, Saint-Jean-de-la-Blaquière, Saint-Privat, Saint-Saturnin-de-Lucian, Soubès, Usclas-du-Bosc.

== Soils and Climate ==
Sandy, stony soils, red ruffes in horizontal layers: limestone marl with overhanging cliffs of Jurassic limestone. Closer to the Hérault, cryoclastic limestone deposits with terraces of shingle down to the river.

The climate zone with the widest temperature variations, it enjoys relatively cool summer nights thanks to its distance from the sea and proximity to the mountainous Causse. As a result the grapes mature slowly and steadily, which is beneficial both to their colour and the wines’ aromatic qualities.

== Production rules ==
Grapes may only come from land parcels identified by the producers and approved by the INAO. Of the 168 regional communes, 32 may produce Terrasses du Larzac wine. The Appellation is for red wines only. A blend of at least two grape varieties is obligatory including the Grape varieties of Syrah, Grenache, and Mourvèdre (60% minimum) with Syrah, Grenache or Mourvèdre limited individually to 75% and Syrah and /or Mourvèdre 20% minimum, Cinsault and Carignan (30% maximum). The wines must be over 12% alcohol level, and from yields no greater than 45 hectolitres per hectare. Vines must be planted at 4000 plants per hectare with a maximum distance between rows of 2.50 metres, pruned short at no more than ten renewal shoots per plant, and no vines under their 5th year may be used.

== History ==
The Romans first planted vines in the Terrasses du Larzac area. The land around Lodève had great appeal, stretching as it did along the busy Roman road which linked Cessero (St Thibéry) with Segodunum (Rodez).

Benedictine period

The foundation of the Monastery of Aniane in 782, the main of the European Benedictine order lead the reintroduction of vines to the vast unoccupied hinterland in the area around Clermont l’Hérault and Lodève. The influence of the Benedictine monks of Aniane and Saint-Guilhem-le-Désert, evidenced by the number of Romanesque churches and priories stretching up to the Buèges valley, was accompanied by the growing of vines on terraces overlooking the Buèges valley and the production of wine made in the cellars of Benedictine priories founded by the Abbey of Saint-Guilhem-le-Désert in the 10th and 11th centuries. Local producers emerged later, using glazed stone vats blocks for vinification in vaulted cellars of village houses.

The 16th-19th century

From 16th century onwards, the landowners authorized the clearing of scrubland in the foothills to allow vines, olives and almond trees to be planted, frequently on stone-covered terraces (faysses.) In the 17-18th century, the growth of eau de vie production brought a greater prosperity to grape growers leading to the establishment of a distillery in most villages. Development of trade with those living in the Massif Central (who exchanged metal from local mines, meat, milk and cereals for wine, as well as dried fish and spices from the coast) lead to Montpeyroux becoming an important trade centre. Later Pas de l’Escalette above Lodève came into being, and the landscape around Pégairolles de l’Escalette is covered with little horizontal stone walls dug into the vertical, rocky hillsides as well as the construction of ‘capitelles’ (stone huts) where grape producers or shepherds could store material and shelter where a long way from home. The Marly decree in 1770 allowed for greater land clearance, with the vineyard planted on the garrigue and allowed for the production of wine to become a serious economic activity.

19th-20th century

Disaster struck in 1850. First oïdium, then phylloxera. As throughout much of France, the vines of the region were almost totally destroyed with most producers choosing to dig up older vines and replant grafting onto American root stock.

Late 20th century

Pioneers such as Aimé Guibert - Mas de Daumas Gassac (Aniane) in 1974 and Olivier Jullien - Mas Jullien (Jonquieres) in 1985, and later Laurent Vaille - Domaine de la Grange des Pères (Aniane) in 1992 led the way to a rediscovery of quality growing in the region inspiring countless other growers and interest from foreign investors such as Robert Mondavi, whose wish to make ‘one of the world's finest wines’ in the appellation’s Massif de l'Arboussas is well documented.

In 2008, Andrew Jefford (Author of The New France) wrote of the appellation:

"Where is the greatest terroir in Languedoc? You could make a case for Faugères, for Pic St Loup, for parts of St Chinian, for Minervois La Livinière, maybe for La Clape, but after my trip I have to say that if you were to write me out a cheque for a million euros and tell me to go to find somewhere to make great red wine, I would look most closely of all at Terrasses du Larzac."

== Producers ==
Producers include: Les Souls, Domaine d'Anglas, Domaine Montcalmes, Domaine Joseph Berth, Domaine de Malavieille, La Reserve d’O, Mas des Brousses, Domaine Coston, Domaine Jordy, Mas du Pountil, Domaine de Blancous, Château de Jonquieres, Mas de l’Ecriture, Mas Cal Demoura, Domaine la Croix Chaptal, Domaine des Conquettes, Domaine les Caizergues, Clos du Serres. Domaine de Granoupic, Domaine Honore Audran, Mas Brunet, Mas Fabregous, Mas Haut-Buis, La Bastide des Oliviers. Domaine des Tremieres, Les domaines du Cap, Domaine La Sauvageonne, Domaine des Cres Richards, Cave des Vignerons du Pegairolles, Cave les Coteaux de Bueges, Cave les treilles d’Aniane, Les Coteaux du Castellas, Cave de Vignerons de St Felix-St Jean. Cave Tours et Terroirs. Domaine de la Deveze, Domaine des Vabres, La Pèira en Damaisèla, Causse d'Arboras, Mas des Chimères, Mas Plan de l’Om. Domaine de Familongue, Domaine du Pas de l’Escalette, Mas de la Seranne, Mas Conscience, Mas de l'Erme, Château Capion.
