= Mas Cal Demoura =

Winery in Occitania, Southern France

Coordinates: 43.6751°N 3.4787°E

Mas Cal Demoura is a wine domaine situated near the village of Jonquières in the Terrasses du Larzac appellation in the north of the Hérault region, Southern France.

Working with the regional red varieties of Syrah, Grenache, Mourvèdre, Cinsaut and Carignan, (once described by its founder as the 'Five woman of the Languedoc'), and the white varieties Chenin blanc Grenache blanc, Roussanne, Viognier, Muscat and Gros Manseng, the domaine has been described by La Revue du vin de France as, 'One of the most classic ambassadors of its appellation.'

== History ==
The history of the Domaine is perhaps one of the most richly resonant of the Hérault, its story so closely interwoven with that of the region in general. This story has been perhaps best set down by Neal Rosenthal, renowned American importer of wines and author of Reflections of a Wine Merchant:

'In 1970, when there was a great exodus from the Languedoc due to a loss of faith in its vineyards to provide a sufficient living, Jean-Pierre Jullien named his domaine "Cal Demoura", which in Occitan means "one must remain". He came from a long line of vignerons and, at that time, he followed most of his colleagues as they closed their caves and attempted to survive by participating in the local cooperative. Jean-Pierre's son, Olivier, refused to follow the path of the cooperative and established his own domaine, the "Mas Jullien", in 1985. Jean-Pierre, in a reversal of the usual process, took the example of his son, resigned from the cooperative and recreated his own estate in 1993.'

Lawrence Osborne writing his book, The Accidental Connoisseur recounts the same tale and goes on to touch on some of the unique qualities of Cal Demoura.

'Mas Cal Demoura is one of the intriguing success stories of modern Languedoc wine. The Julliens have been farming wine for generations around the sleepy villages of Jonquieres and Saint-Felix-de-Lodes. It was his son Olivier Jullien who decided in 1985 to start a new winery called Mas Jullien based on completely different principles: it would make a terroir wine, not cooperative wine. In 1993 Jean-Pierre started a winery of his own, Cal Demoura.'

'We drank one of Jean-Pierre's softly earthly wines, a Coteaux du Languedoc L'Infidèle 2001, and then a pure Cinsault, one of the five Southern varietal with which the Julliens work, blending their wines from all five. Terroir, again? It was rustic and gay, I decided, and here (unlike Daumas) I could taste something of the earth. Garrigue, perhaps, though to find garrique in a Languedoc wine is the smoothest of cliches. More to the point there was something of Jean-Pierre in Jean-Pierre's L'Infidèle. Something booming, warm, square-shouldered. but how could I not think of this since he was gesticulating right in front of me?...It struck me that Aimé Guibert and Jean-Pierre Jullien both expounded the truths of terroir. They spoke a similar language on the surface. And they worked the same land. But how different their mental universes were. How different too, was their conception of place.'

In 2004, Jean-Pierre retired, and the responsibility of the domaine was taking up by Isabelle and Vincent Goumard in his place. Impressed by the estate's winemaking philosophy and the potential of its terroir, the couple worked side by side with Jean-Pierre in the vineyard and in the cellar, before continuing its legacy. As an example, the vintage 2003 was handled by both Jean-Pierre and Vincent. Vincent Goumard also found support in Jean-Pierre's son, Olivier Jullien.

The Gourmards have handled the delicate task of guiding Mas Cal Demoura forward while retaining its unique qualities well, with Decanter Magazine reporting in 2005, ‘Talented young winemaker, Vincent Gourmard looks set to carry the domaine's reputation for excellence in the future.’ and La Revue du vin de France in 2008, "Isabelle and Vincent Goumard have succeeded in their conversion of Cal Demoura. The future is bright for these meticulous young winemakers, able to benefit from past experience." The style of the wines have slowly evolved to gain more complexity and more delicate structure. The 2007 and the 2008 vintage are clearly among the best produced by Mas Cal Demoura.

== Vineyard ==
The vineyard area extends to 11 ha. with vines planted on stony limestone and calcareous clay (red and white) soils. Vines average around 25 years of age. The vineyards benefit from cooling northern winds from the Causse du Larzac over the ripening period during summer nights contributing greater freshness to the wines, as well as sea influence brought by southern winds, said to limit the effects of drought.

== Production ==
The domaine produces 40 000 bottles a year.

Two white wines are nowadays available:

- L'Etincelle (first release in 2004)
- Paroles de Pierres (first release in 2008)

and three red wines:

- L'Infidèle (the historical cuvée)
- Les Combarioles (a parcellar selection, since 2004)
- Feu Sacré (a cuvée of very old Grenache vines, only produced in the best years. Starting 2006)
