= Salagou =

River in France

Coordinates: 43.650556°N 3.233333°E

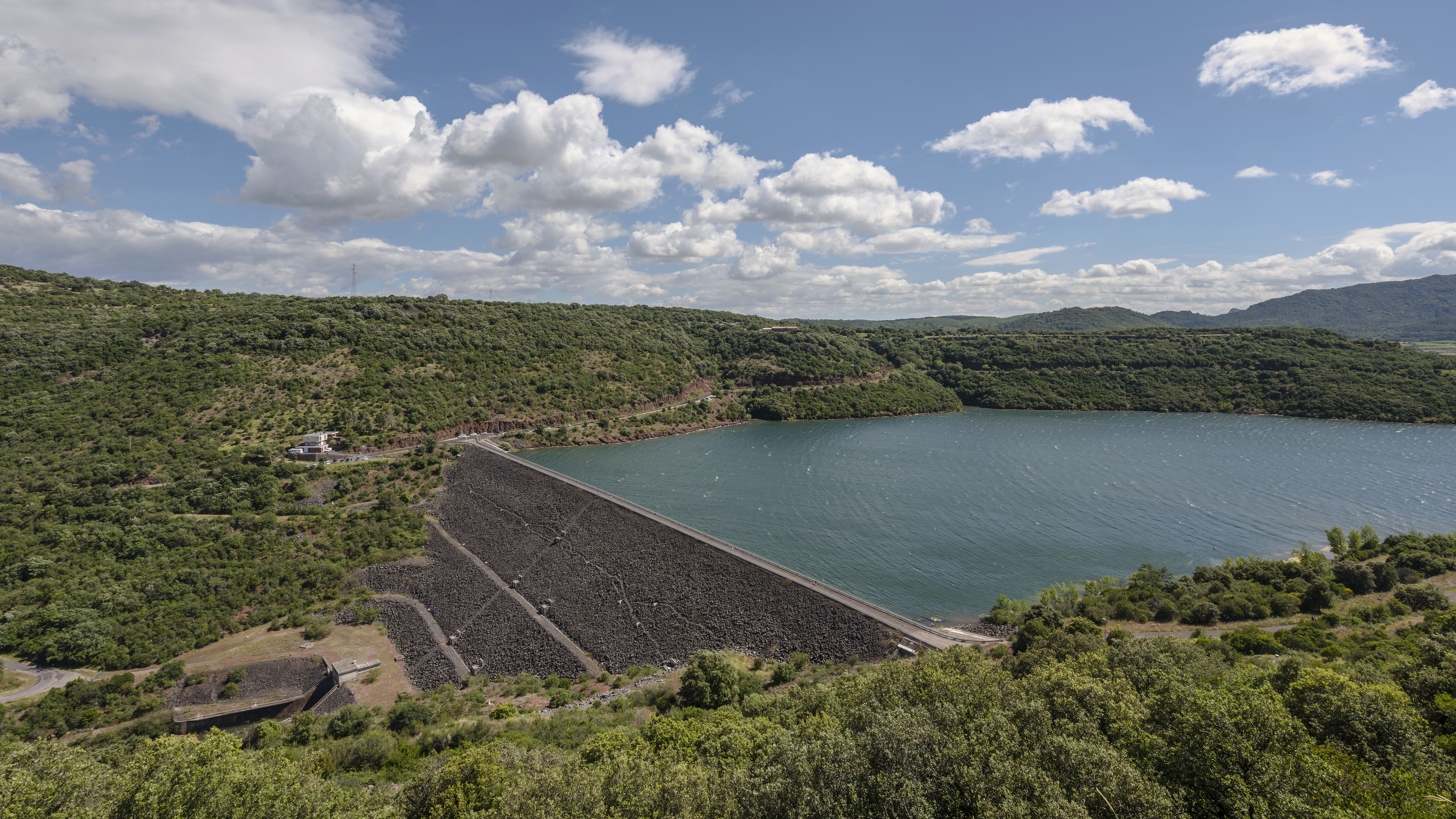
The Salagou Dam, which forms Lake Salagou

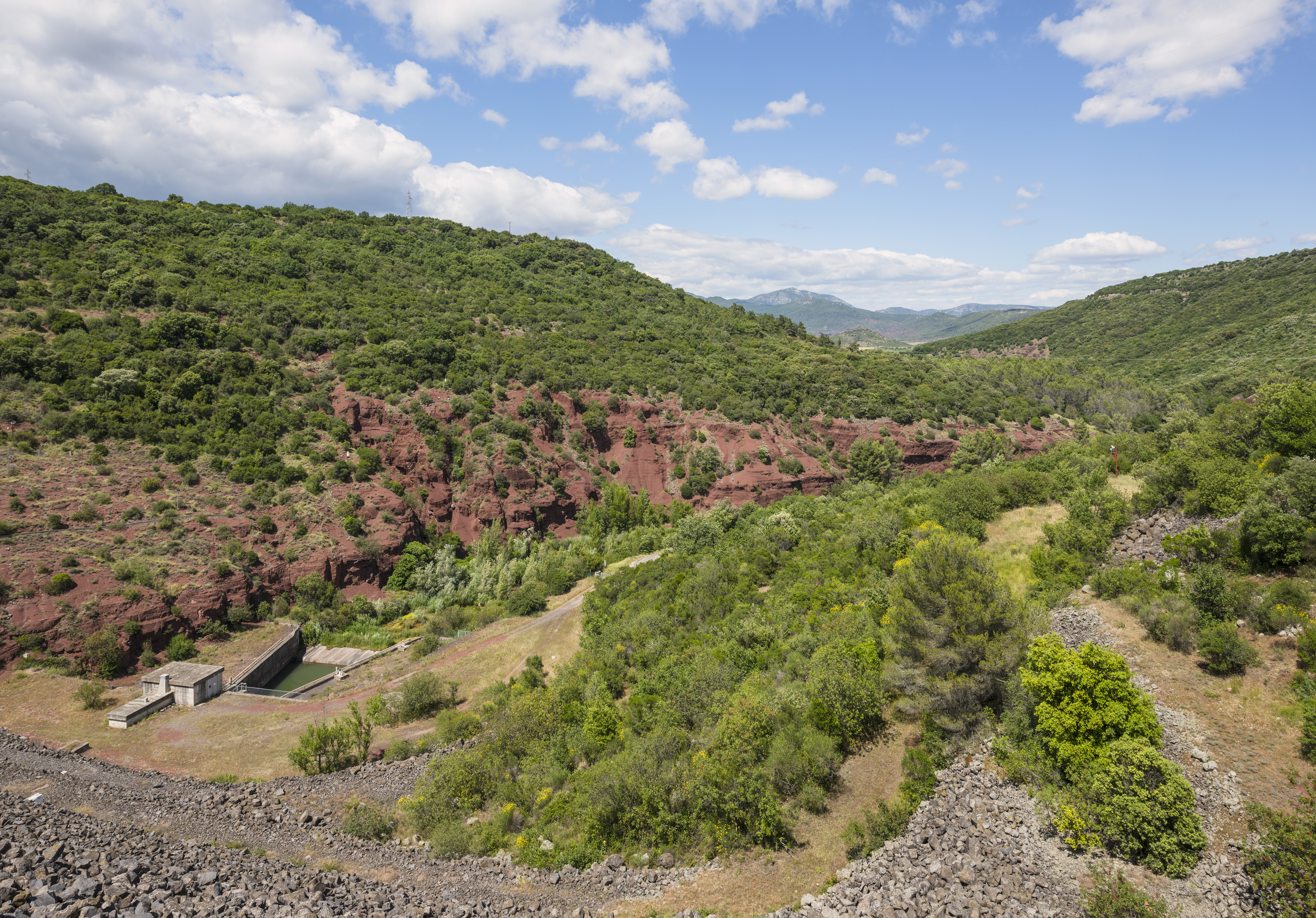
Downstream view of Salagou valley from Salagou Dam

The Salagou is a river in the Hérault department of the Occitania region in southern France. It rises near the Col de la Merquière, on the western boundary of the commune of Brenas. It flows generally east-northeast and, after approximately 21 kilometres, joins the Lergue as a right-bank tributary on the boundary between the communes of Lacoste and Le Bosc. The river is impounded by the Salagou Dam to form Lake Salagou.

== Communes ==
The Salagou passes through or along the boundaries of eight communes: Brenas, Celles, Clermont-l'Hérault, Lacoste, Le Bosc, Mérifons, Octon, Salasc.

== See also ==
- Salagou Formation
