= Lacoste, Hérault =

Lacoste
- Commune
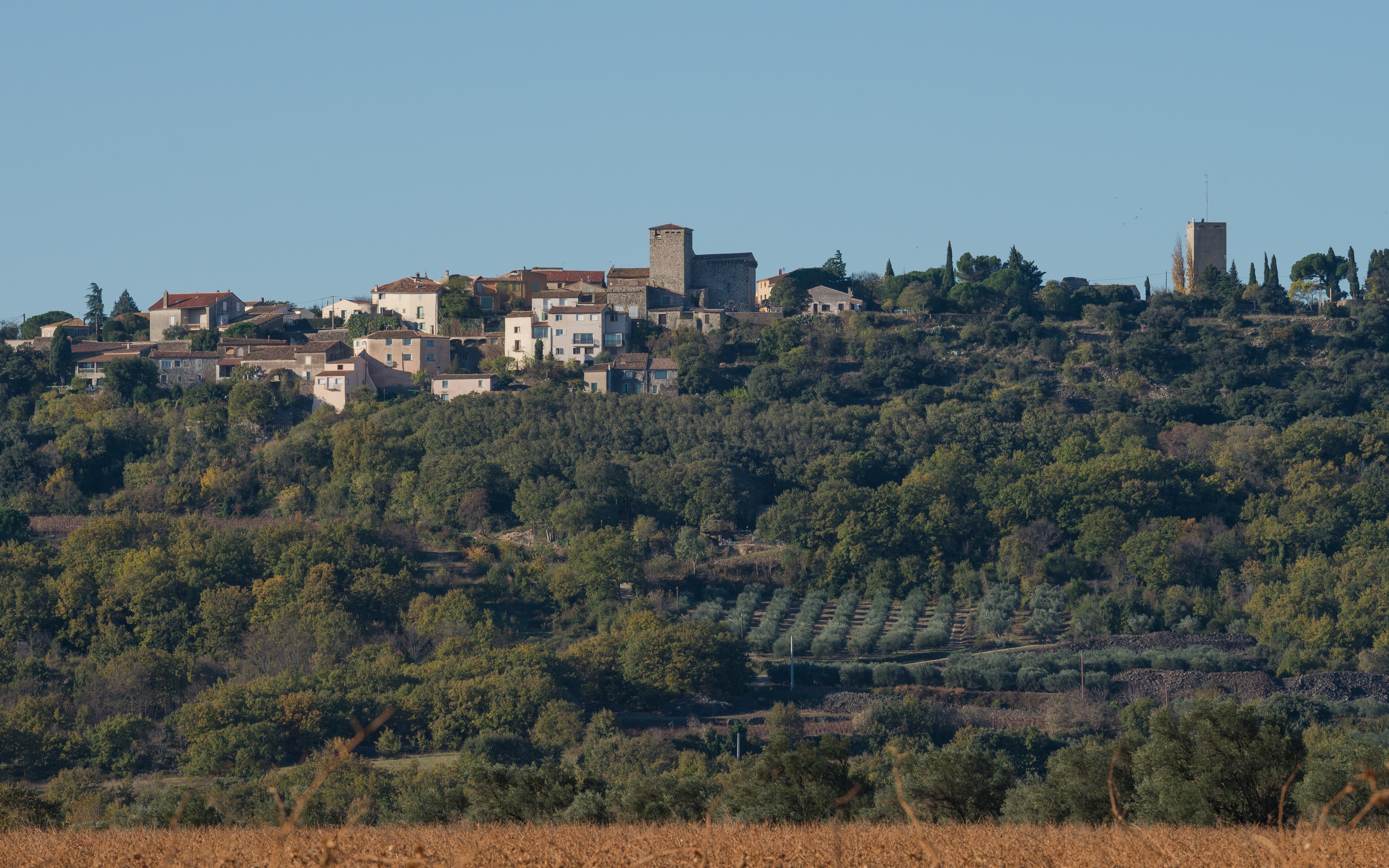
- General view

- Coat of arms
- Location of Lacoste
- Location within France Location within Occitanie
- Coordinates: 43°38′52″N 3°26′14″E
- Country: France
- Region: Occitania
- Department: Hérault
- Arrondissement: Lodève
- Canton: Clermont-l'Hérault

Government
  - Mayor (2020–2026): Marc Carayon
- Area^{1}: 7.46 km^{2} (2.88 sq mi)
- Elevation: 120 m (390 ft)
- Highest elevation: 266 m (873 ft)
- Lowest elevation: 40 m (130 ft)
- Population (2023): 303
  - Density: 40.6/km^{2} (105/sq mi)
- Time zone: UTC+01:00 (CET)
  - Summer (DST): UTC+02:00 (CEST)
- INSEE/Postal code: 34124 /34800
- ^{1} French Land Register data, which excludes lakes, ponds, glaciers > 1 km^{2} (0.386 sq mi or 247 acres) and river estuaries.

Lacoste (French pronunciation: [lakɔst]; Occitan: La Còsta) is a commune in the Hérault département in the Occitanie region in southern France.

== Geography ==
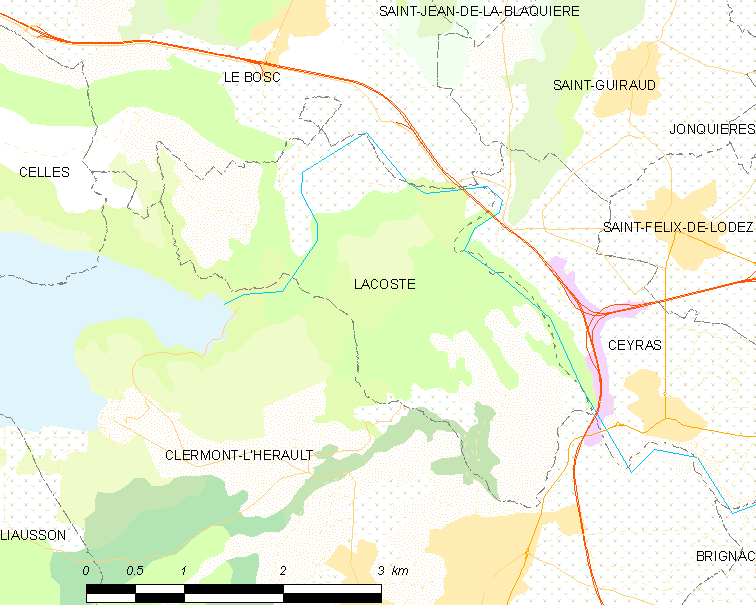
Map

== Population ==
Historical population
Year	Pop.	±% p.a.
1968	125	—
1975	145	+2.14%
1982	174	+2.64%
1990	225	+3.27%
1999	248	+1.09%
2007	276	+1.35%
2012	303	+1.88%
2017	325	+1.41%
2023	303	−1.16%
Source: INSEE

== See also ==
- Communes of the Hérault department
- Salagou
