= Lake Salagou =

Lake in southern France

Coordinates: 43.65912°N 3.36813°E

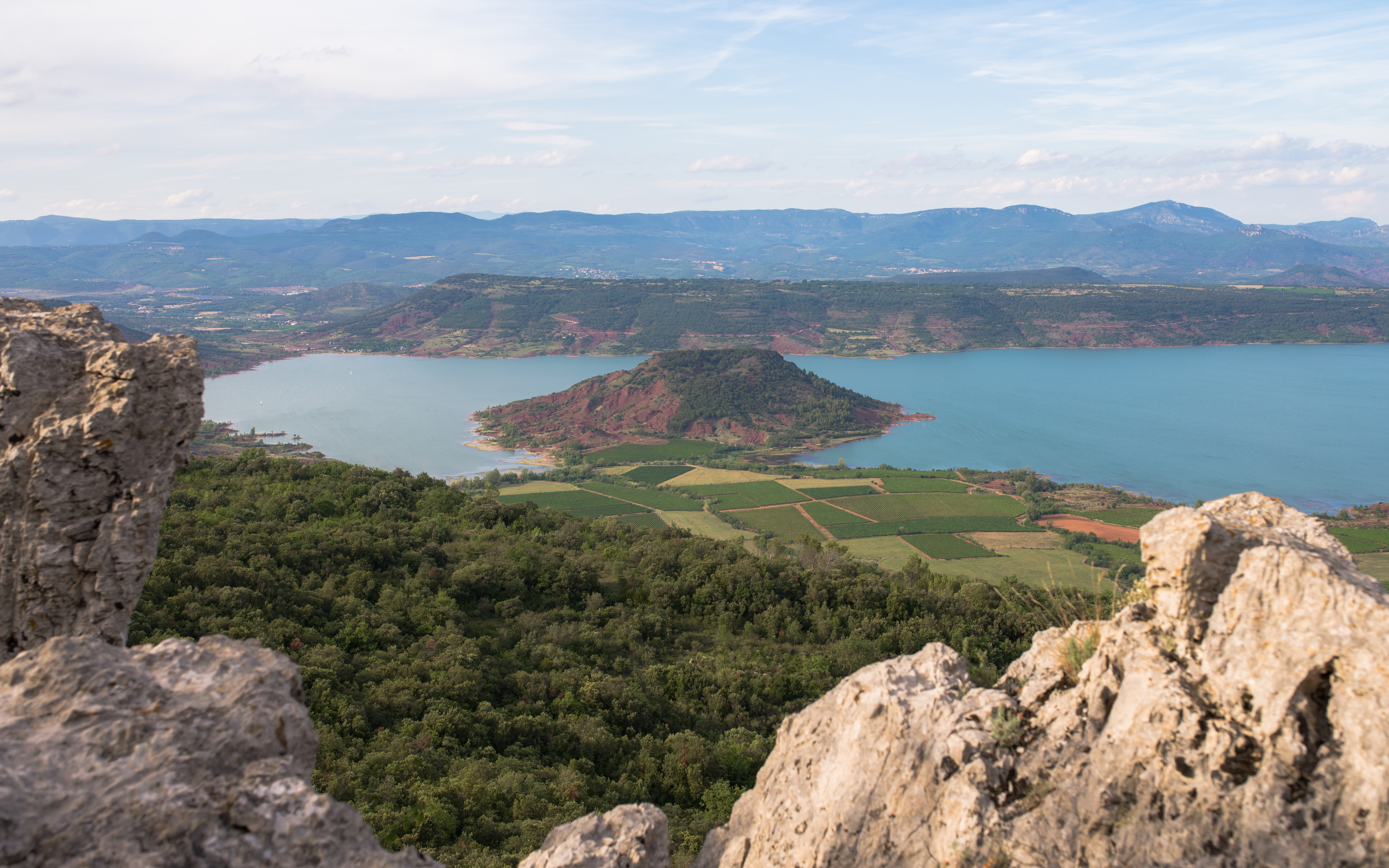
View of Lake Salagou from the southwest

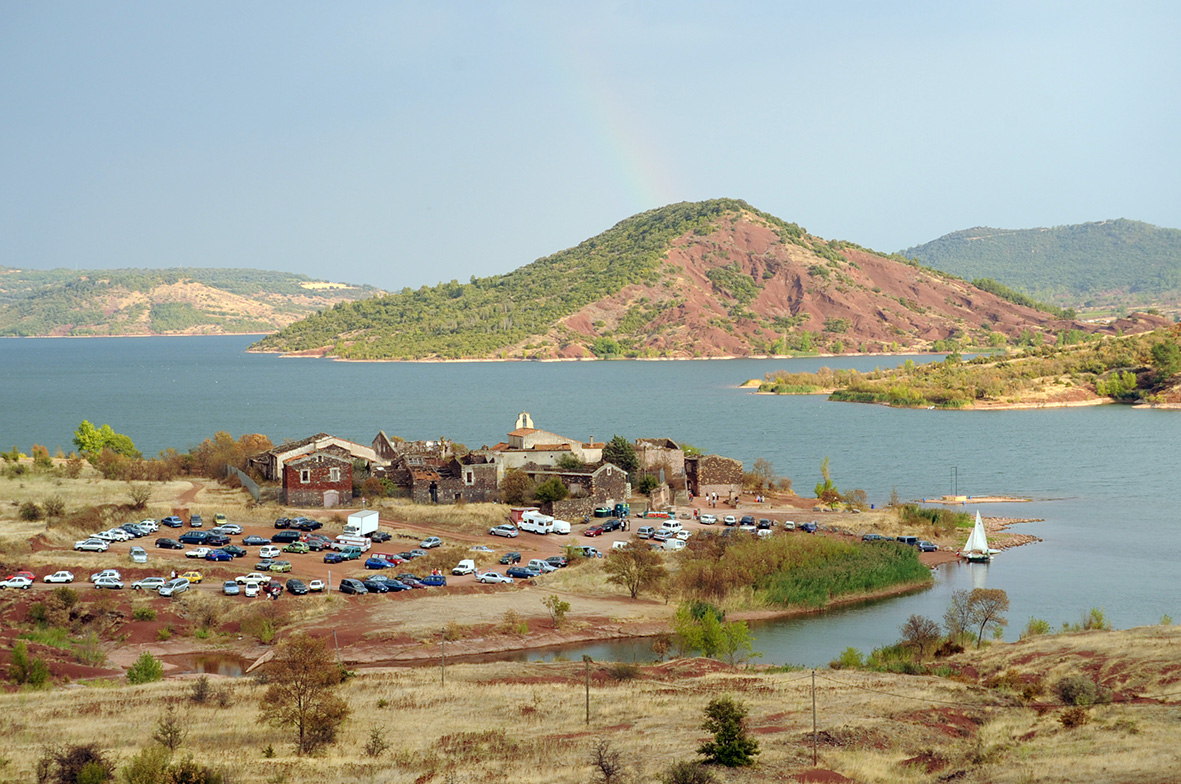
The village of Celles by the lake in 2009

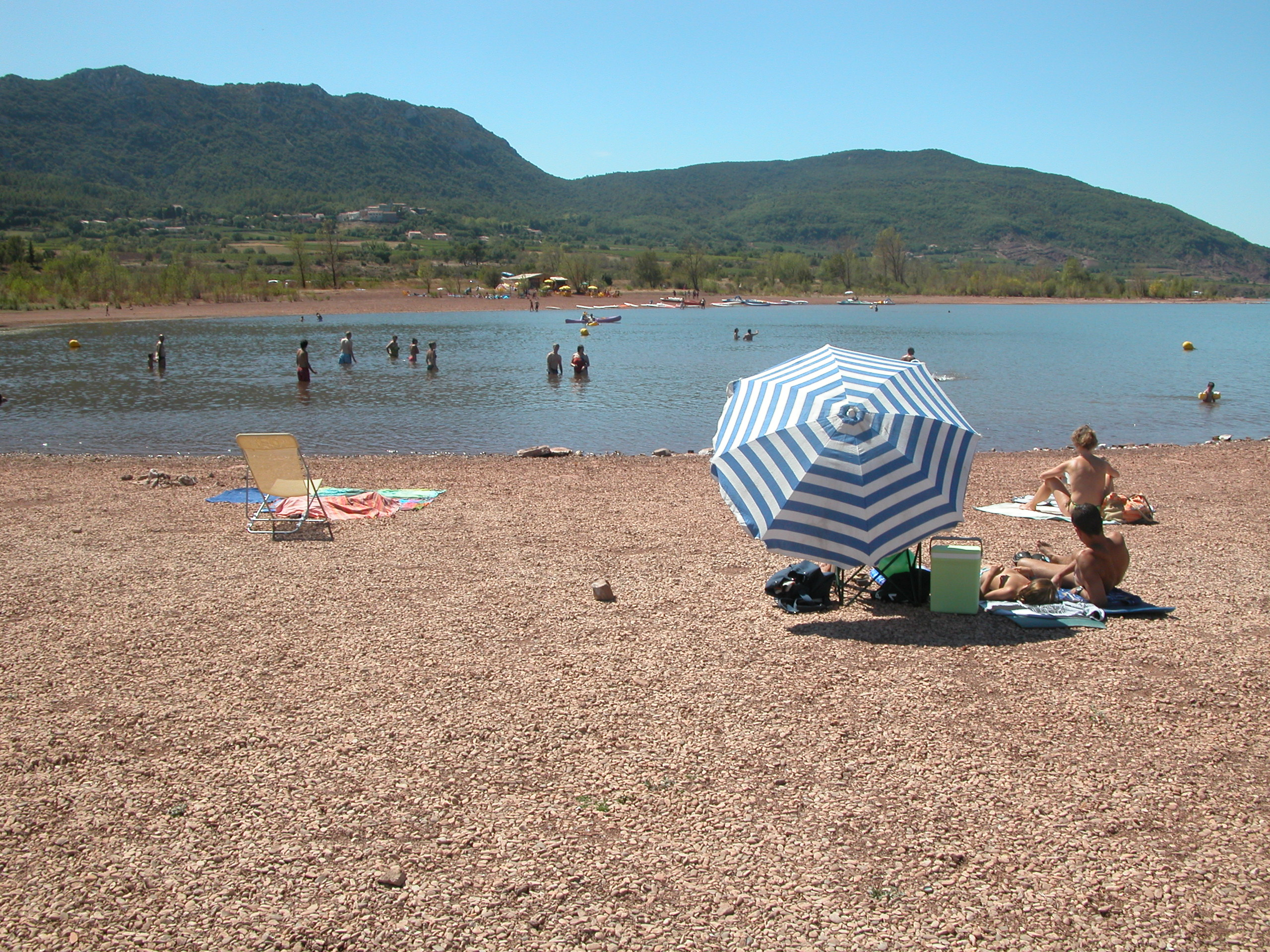
Beach at Lake Salagou in 2006

Lake Salagou (French: lac du Salagou) is a reservoir formed by the Salagou Dam. It is located in the central part of the Hérault department in southern France, on the Salagou river, a tributary of the Lergue River, which in turn flows into the Hérault River.

== Geography ==
The lake has an average depth of 15 metres and a maximum measured depth of 50 metres. Its normal operating level is 139 metres above sea level. The original plan envisaged raising the level to 150 metres, which would have submerged the village of Celles. Although the village was evacuated, the higher level was never implemented; in 1996, the maximum level was definitively fixed at 139 metres. The lake covers approximately 750 hectares and has a storage capacity of 103 million cubic metres.

The surrounding mountains and plateaus rise to 300 metres in the east and 407 metres at Carels in the west. To the south, Mont Liausson rises to 535 metres and forms a natural barrier between Lake Salagou and the dolomitic cirque of Mourèze.

== Game ==
Salagou is a browser game set around Lac du Salagou. The player controls Octo, who travels through the red badlands to the lake, crosses five water zones, and then reaches the dam. The game uses landscape elements from the area, including the red badlands, the lake, and the dam. The story involving Octo, the rescue brigade, and the dam breach is fictional.

== Communes ==
The lake extends across six communes: Celles, Clermont-l'Hérault, Le Puech, Liausson, Octon, Salasc.
