= Liausson =

- Commune
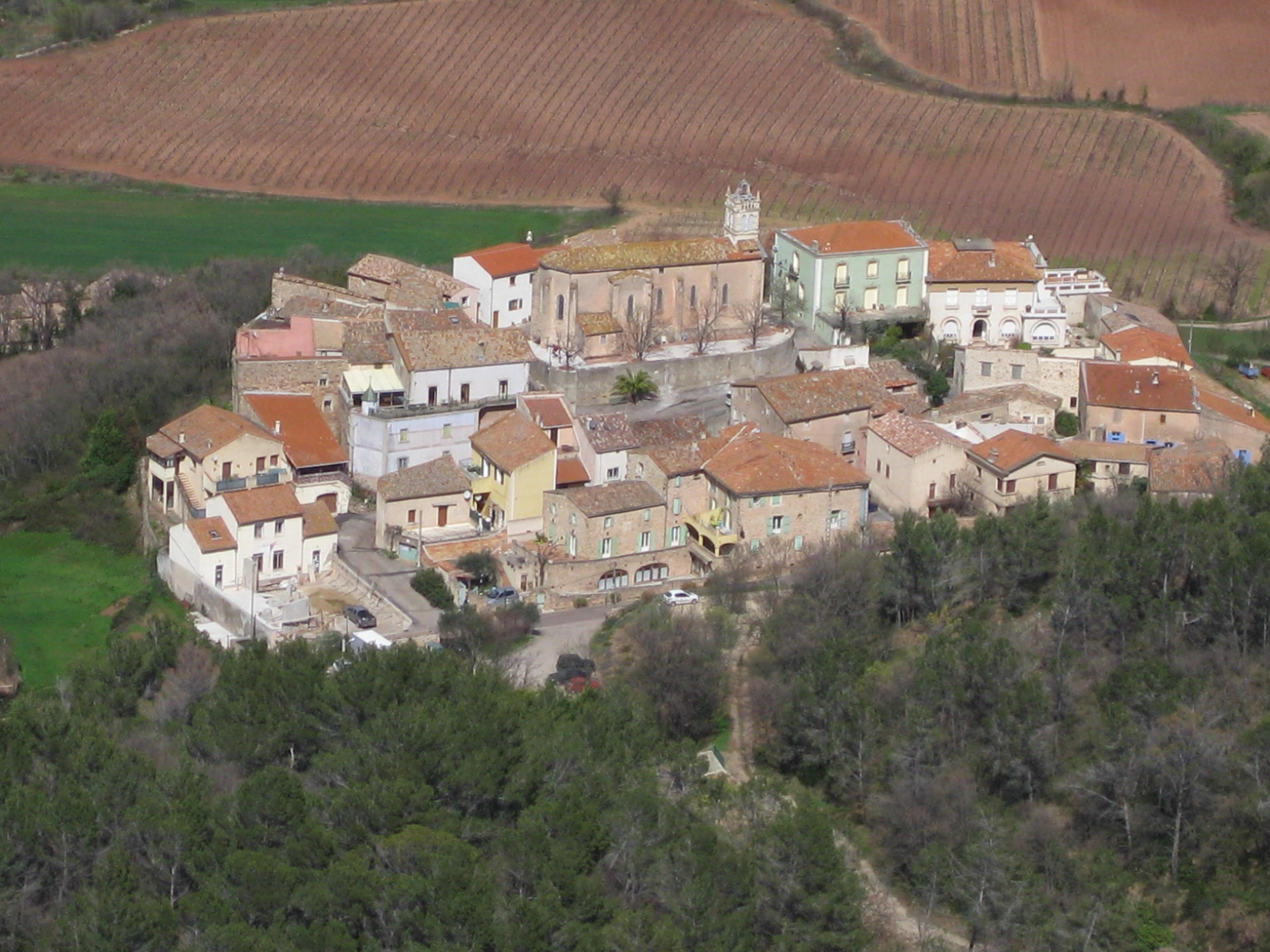
- A general view of Liausson
- Location of Liausson
- Location within France Location within Occitanie
- Coordinates: 43°38′12″N 3°22′14″E
- Country: France
- Region: Occitania
- Department: Hérault
- Arrondissement: Lodève
- Canton: Clermont-l'Hérault
- Intercommunality: Clermontais

Government
  - Mayor (2020–2026): Alain Soulayrol
- Area^{1}: 7.95 km^{2} (3.07 sq mi)
- Elevation: 210 m (690 ft)
- Highest elevation: 537 m (1,762 ft)
- Lowest elevation: 135 m (443 ft)
- Population (2023): 156
  - Density: 19.6/km^{2} (50.8/sq mi)
- Time zone: UTC+01:00 (CET)
  - Summer (DST): UTC+02:00 (CEST)
- INSEE/Postal code: 34137 /34800
- ^{1} French Land Register data, which excludes lakes, ponds, glaciers > 1 km^{2} (0.386 sq mi or 247 acres) and river estuaries.

Liausson (French pronunciation: [ljosɔ̃]) is a commune in the Hérault département in the Occitanie region in southern France.

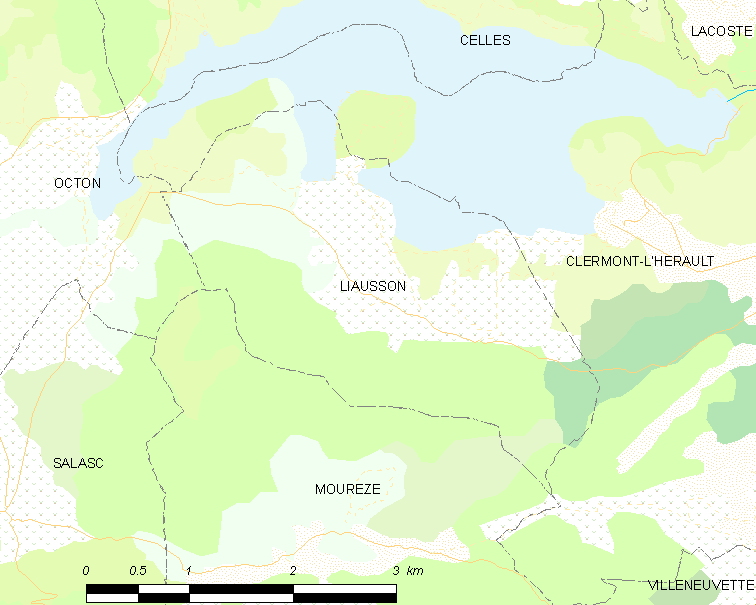
Map

== Population ==
Historical population
Year	Pop.	±% p.a.
1968	89	—
1975	84	−0.82%
1982	99	+2.37%
1990	95	−0.51%
1999	110	+1.64%
2007	111	+0.11%
2012	154	+6.77%
2017	146	−1.06%
2023	156	+1.11%
Source: INSEE

== Sights ==
The church was built on the ruined foundations of a Roman villa

== Gallery ==
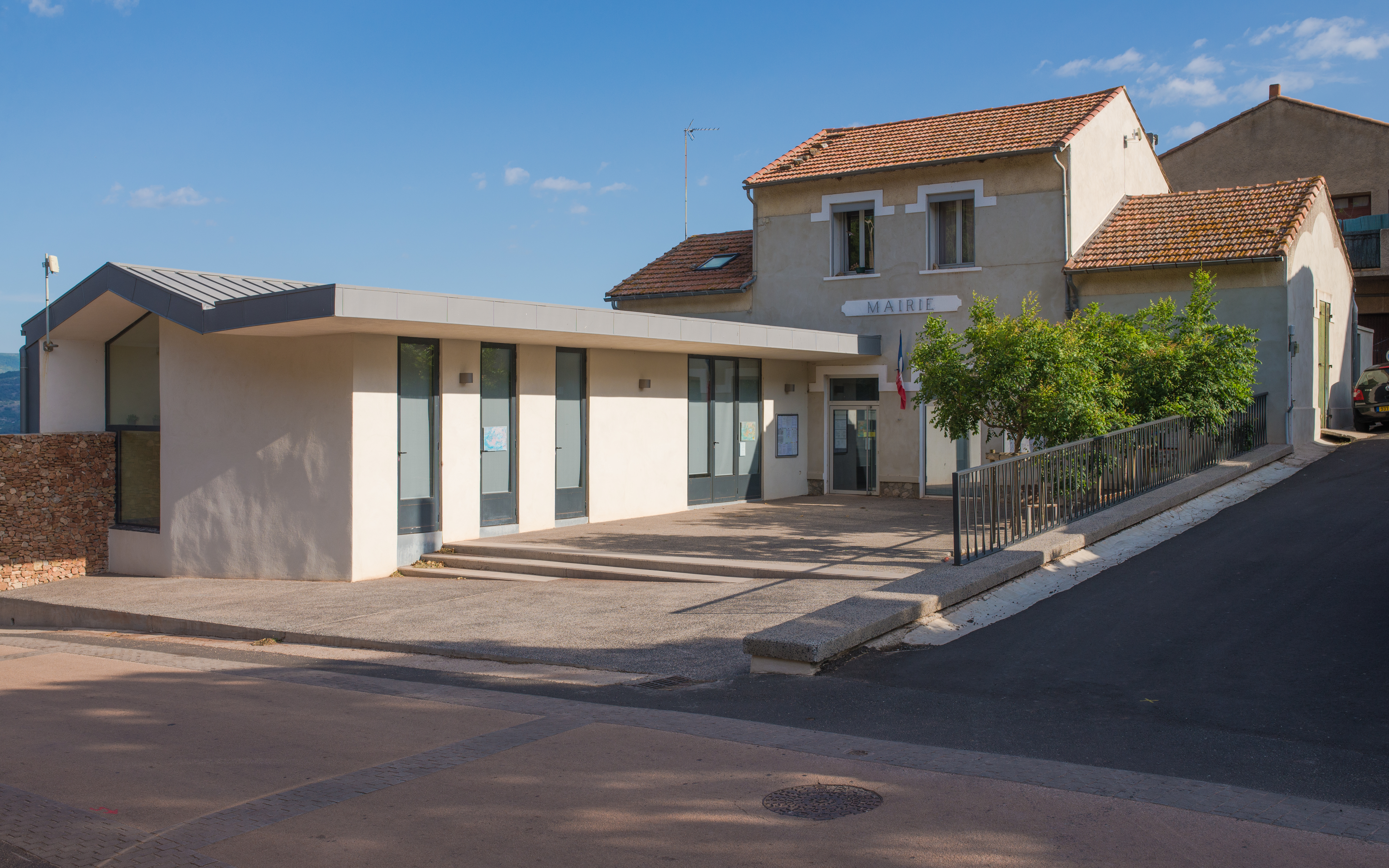
Town hall.

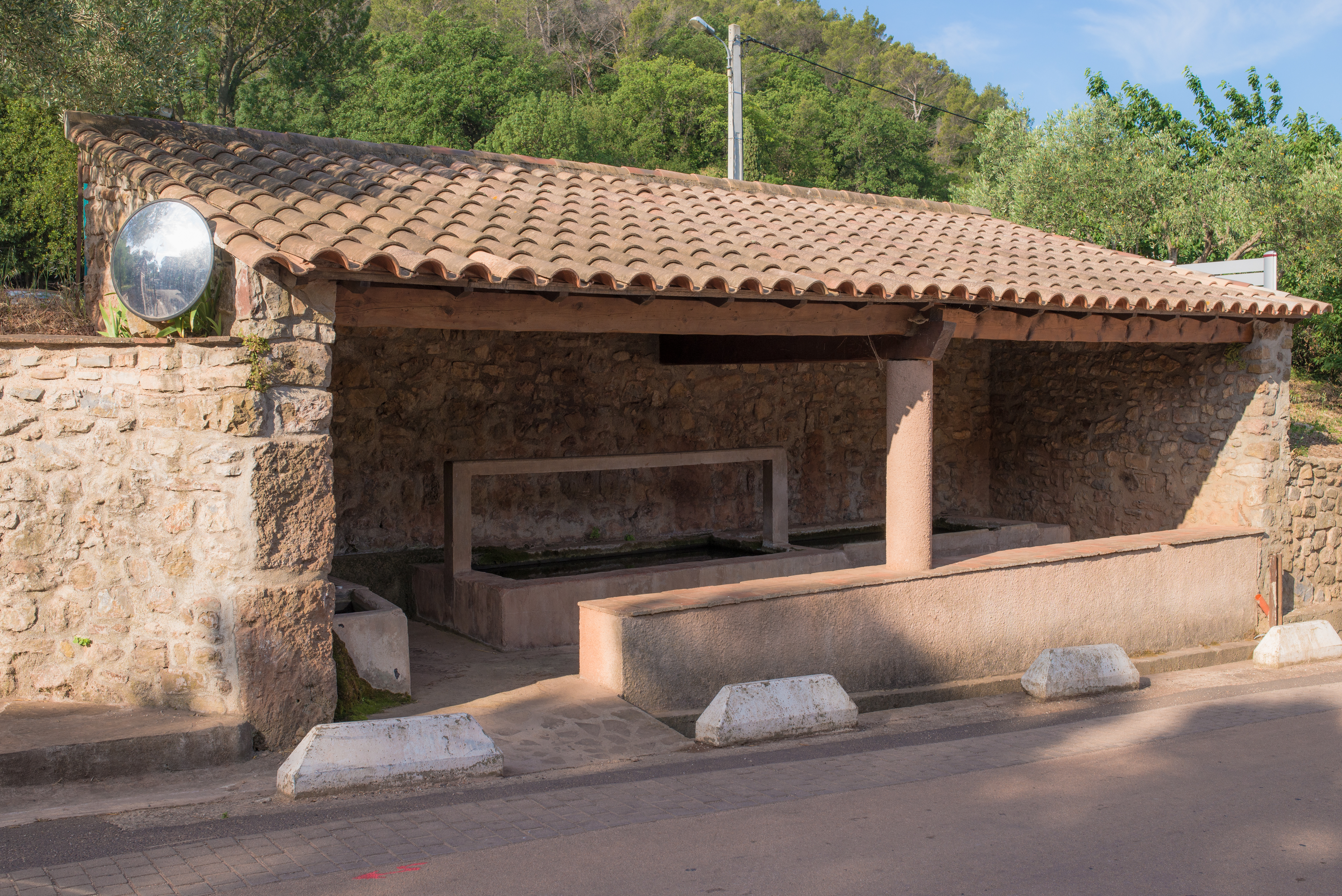
Washhouse.

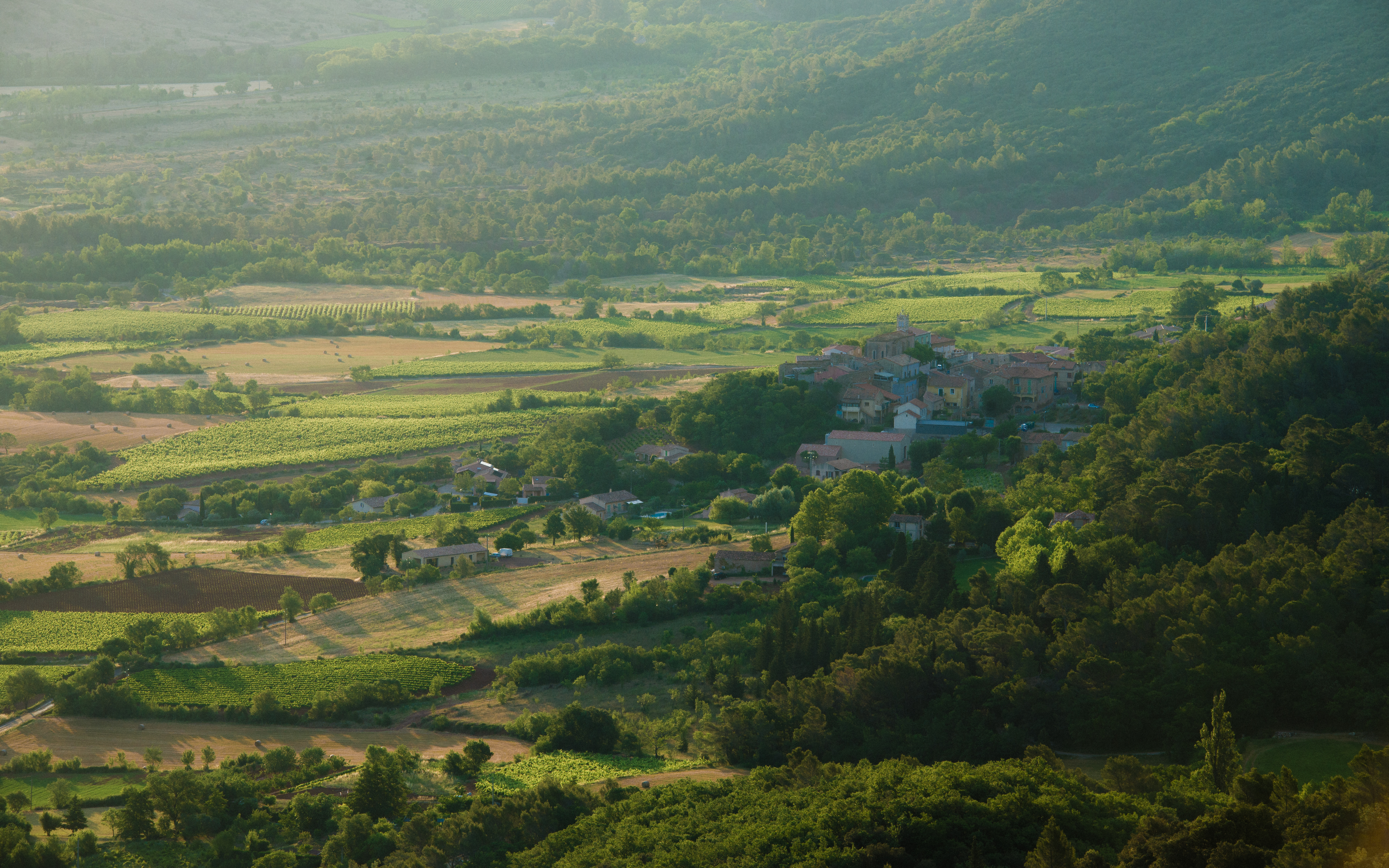
Dawn on the village.

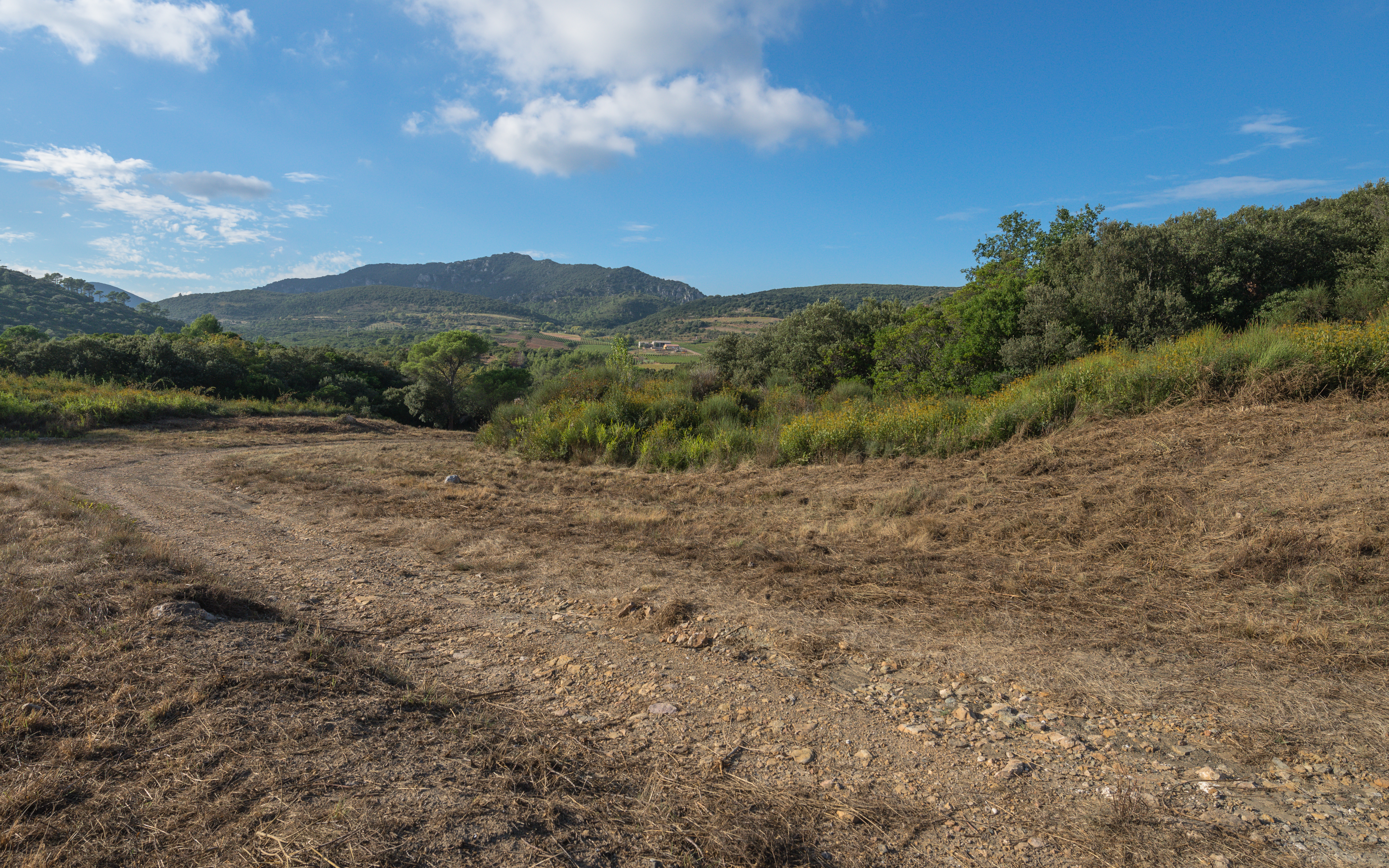
"Montagne de Liausson" from Villeneuvette.

== See also ==
- Communes of the Hérault department
- Lake Salagou
