= Arboretum du Mas du Rouquet =

Arboretum in Languedoc-Roussillon, France

Coordinates: 43.804°N 3.324°E

The Arboretum du Mas du Rouquet is an arboretum located in Pégairolles-de-l'Escalette, Hérault, Languedoc-Roussillon, France. It contains trees including Abies alba, Acer platanoides, Buxus sempervirens, Carpinus betulus, Cedrus atlantica, Fraxinus excelsior, Pinus laricio, Pinus nigra austriaca, Pinus sylvestris, Populus alba, and Ulmus campestris.

== See also ==
- List of botanical gardens in France
