= Le Puech =

- Commune
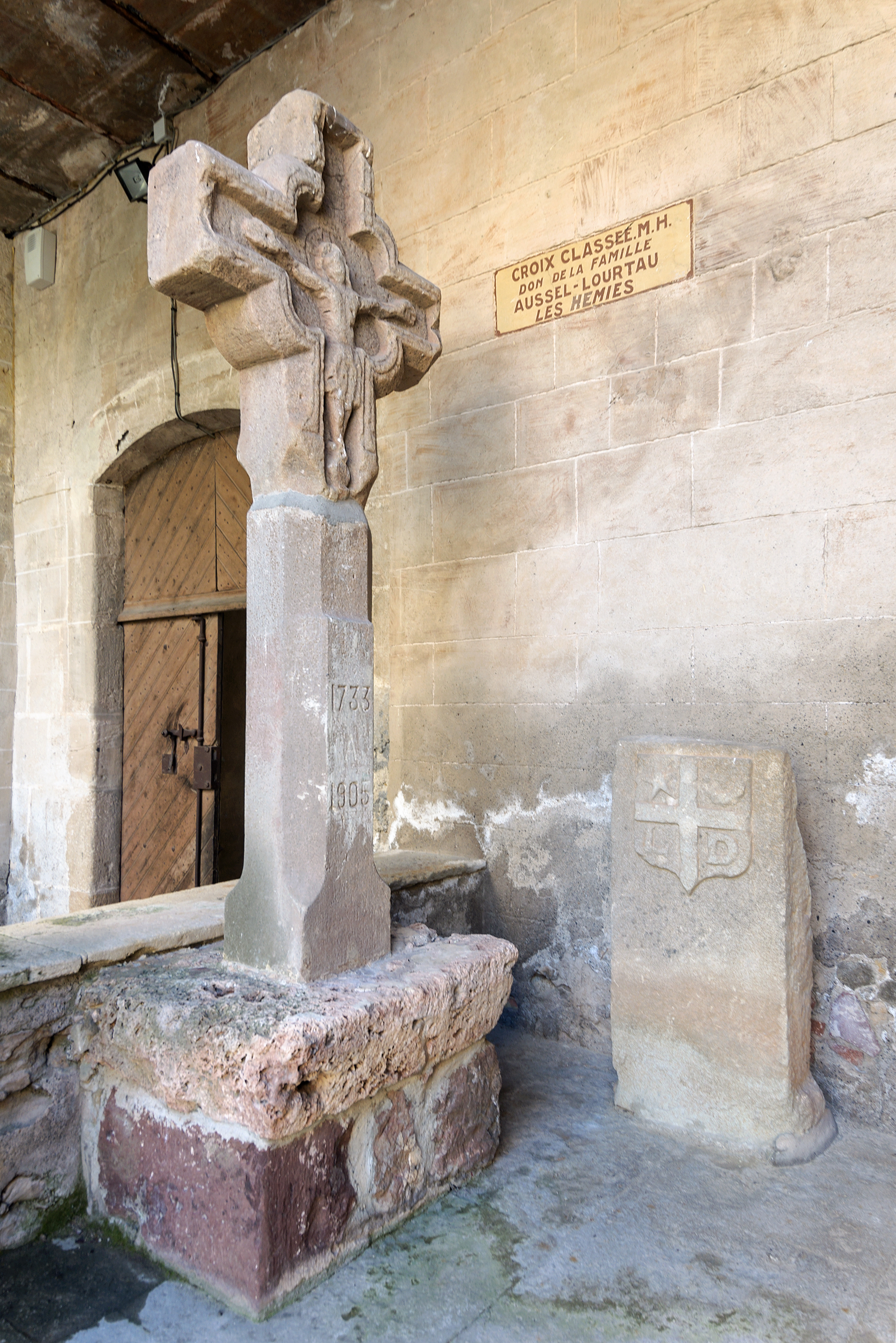
- Historic wayside cross in Le Puech

- Coat of arms
- Location of Le Puech
- Location within France Location within Occitanie
- Coordinates: 43°41′43″N 3°18′54″E
- Country: France
- Region: Occitania
- Department: Hérault
- Arrondissement: Lodève
- Canton: Lodève
- Intercommunality: Lodévois et Larzac

Government
  - Mayor (2020–2026): Bernard Goujon
- Area^{1}: 15.86 km^{2} (6.12 sq mi)
- Elevation: 262 m (860 ft)
- Highest elevation: 385 m (1,263 ft)
- Lowest elevation: 98 m (322 ft)
- Population (2023): 262
  - Density: 16.5/km^{2} (42.8/sq mi)
- Time zone: UTC+01:00 (CET)
  - Summer (DST): UTC+02:00 (CEST)
- INSEE/Postal code: 34220 /34700
- ^{1} French Land Register data, which excludes lakes, ponds, glaciers > 1 km^{2} (0.386 sq mi or 247 acres) and river estuaries.

Le Puech is a commune in the Hérault department in the Occitanie region in southern France.

== Population ==
Historical population
Year	Pop.	±% p.a.
1968	142	—
1975	113	−3.21%
1982	129	+1.91%
1990	135	+0.57%
1999	189	+3.81%
2007	221	+1.97%
2012	233	+1.06%
2017	242	+0.76%
2023	262	+1.33%
Source: INSEE

== Sights ==
- Jardin botanique du Puech

== See also ==
- Communes of the Hérault department
- Lake Salagou
