= Jardin botanique du Puech =

Botanical garden in France

Coordinates: 43.6953°N 3.315°E

The Jardin botanique du Puech is a private botanical garden located in Le Puech, Hérault, Languedoc-Roussillon, France, which contains a variety of fruit trees and Mediterranean plants. As of January 2009, it is unclear whether the garden is still open to the public.

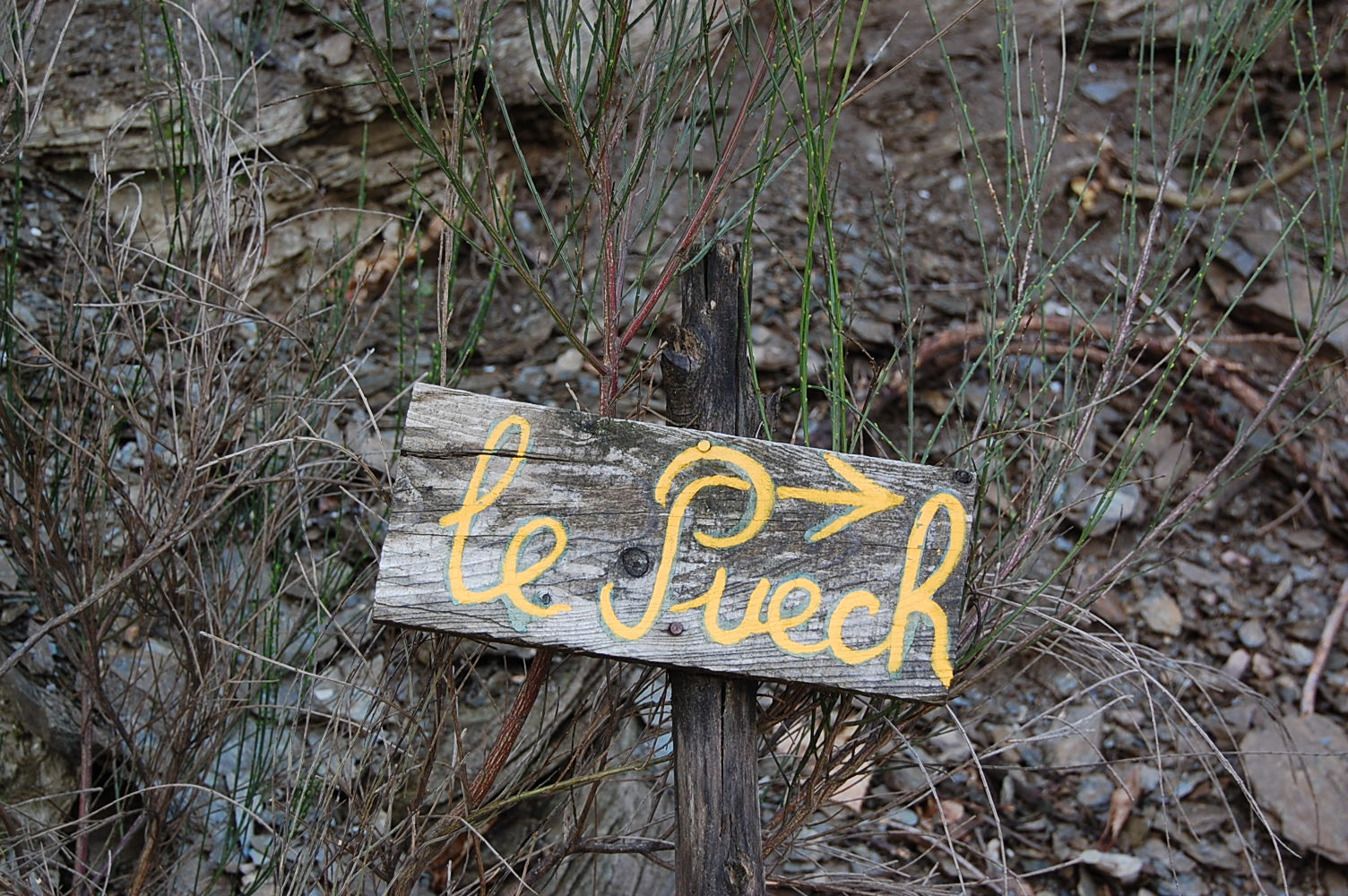
Jardin botanique du Puech

== See also ==
- List of botanical gardens in France
