= Brenas =

- Commune
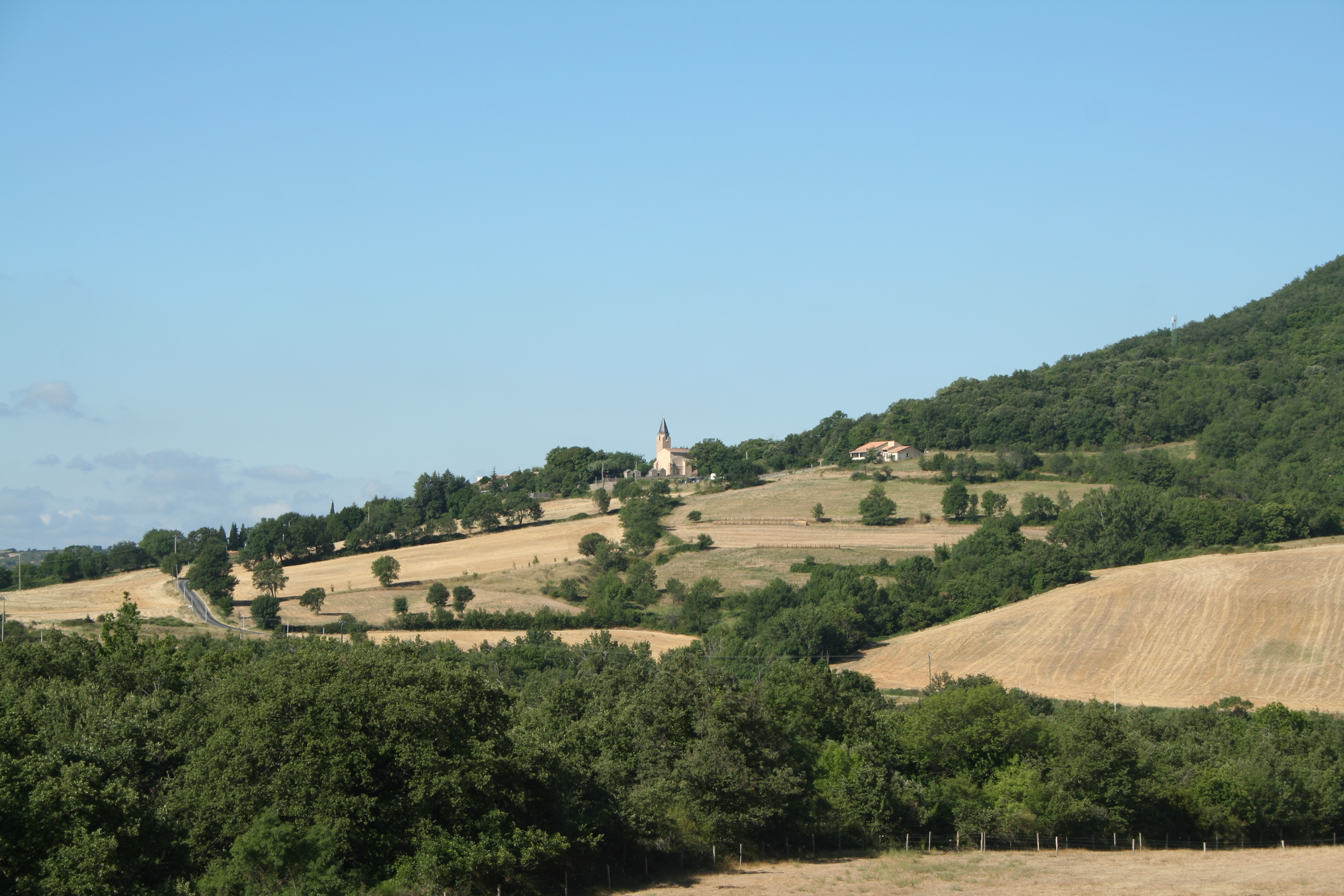
- View of Brenas
- Location of Brenas
- Location within France Location within Occitanie
- Coordinates: 43°39′15″N 3°15′27″E
- Country: France
- Region: Occitania
- Department: Hérault
- Arrondissement: Béziers
- Canton: Clermont-l'Hérault

Government
  - Mayor (2020–2026): Michel Vellas
- Area^{1}: 10.59 km^{2} (4.09 sq mi)
- Elevation: 446 m (1,463 ft)
- Highest elevation: 625 m (2,051 ft)
- Lowest elevation: 188 m (617 ft)
- Population (2023): 58
  - Density: 5.5/km^{2} (14/sq mi)
- Time zone: UTC+01:00 (CET)
  - Summer (DST): UTC+02:00 (CEST)
- INSEE/Postal code: 34040 /34650
- ^{1} French Land Register data, which excludes lakes, ponds, glaciers > 1 km^{2} (0.386 sq mi or 247 acres) and river estuaries.

Brenas is a commune in the Hérault department in southern France.

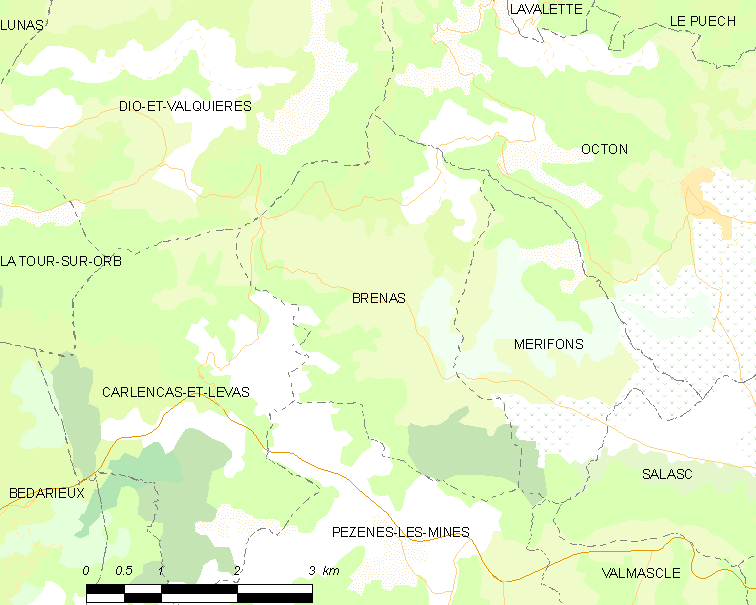
Map

== Population ==
Historical population
Year	Pop.	±% p.a.
1968	31	—
1975	31	+0.00%
1982	30	−0.47%
1990	28	−0.86%
1999	25	−1.25%
2007	42	+6.70%
2012	52	+4.36%
2017	53	+0.38%
2023	58	+1.51%
Source: INSEE

== See also ==
- Communes of the Hérault department
- Salagou
