= Salasc =

- Commune
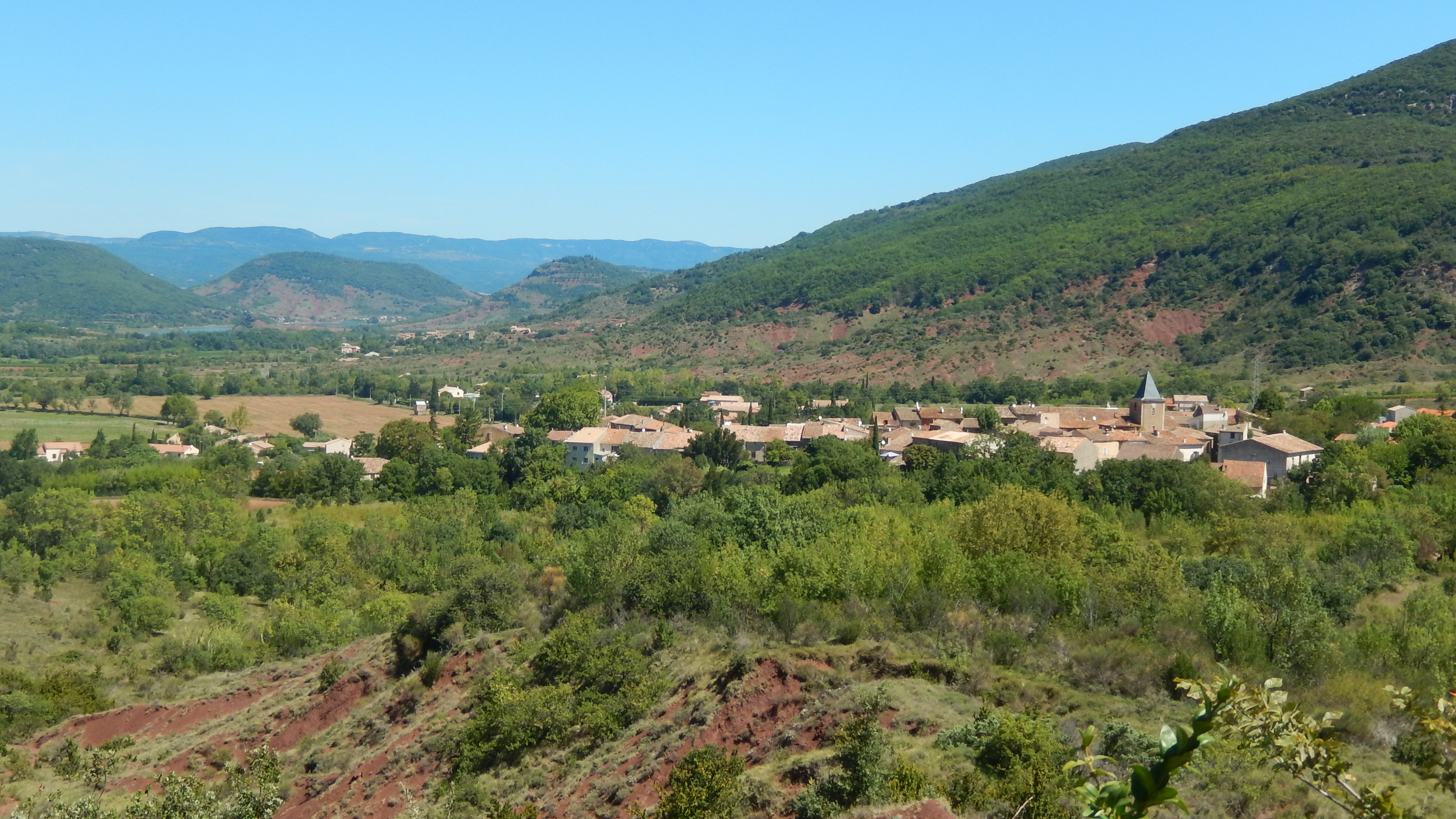

- Coat of arms
- Location of Salasc
- Location within France Location within Occitanie
- Coordinates: 43°37′15″N 3°19′00″E
- Country: France
- Region: Occitania
- Department: Hérault
- Arrondissement: Lodève
- Canton: Clermont-l'Hérault
- Intercommunality: Clermontais

Government
  - Mayor (2022–2026): Jean-Claude Clozier
- Area^{1}: 9 km^{2} (3.5 sq mi)
- Elevation: 200 m (660 ft)
- Highest elevation: 489 m (1,604 ft)
- Lowest elevation: 136 m (446 ft)
- Population (2023): 357
  - Density: 40/km^{2} (100/sq mi)
- Time zone: UTC+01:00 (CET)
  - Summer (DST): UTC+02:00 (CEST)
- INSEE/Postal code: 34292 /34800
- ^{1} French Land Register data, which excludes lakes, ponds, glaciers > 1 km^{2} (0.386 sq mi or 247 acres) and river estuaries.

Salasc (French pronunciation: [salask]) is a commune in the Hérault department in the Occitanie region in southern France.

== Population ==
Historical population
Year	Pop.	±% p.a.
1968	181	—
1975	131	−4.51%
1982	155	+2.43%
1990	141	−1.18%
1999	192	+3.49%
2007	251	+3.41%
2012	305	+3.97%
2017	301	−0.26%
2023	357	+2.88%
Source: INSEE

== See also ==
- Communes of the Hérault department
- Lake Salagou
- Salagou
