= Pégairolles-de-l'Escalette =

- Commune
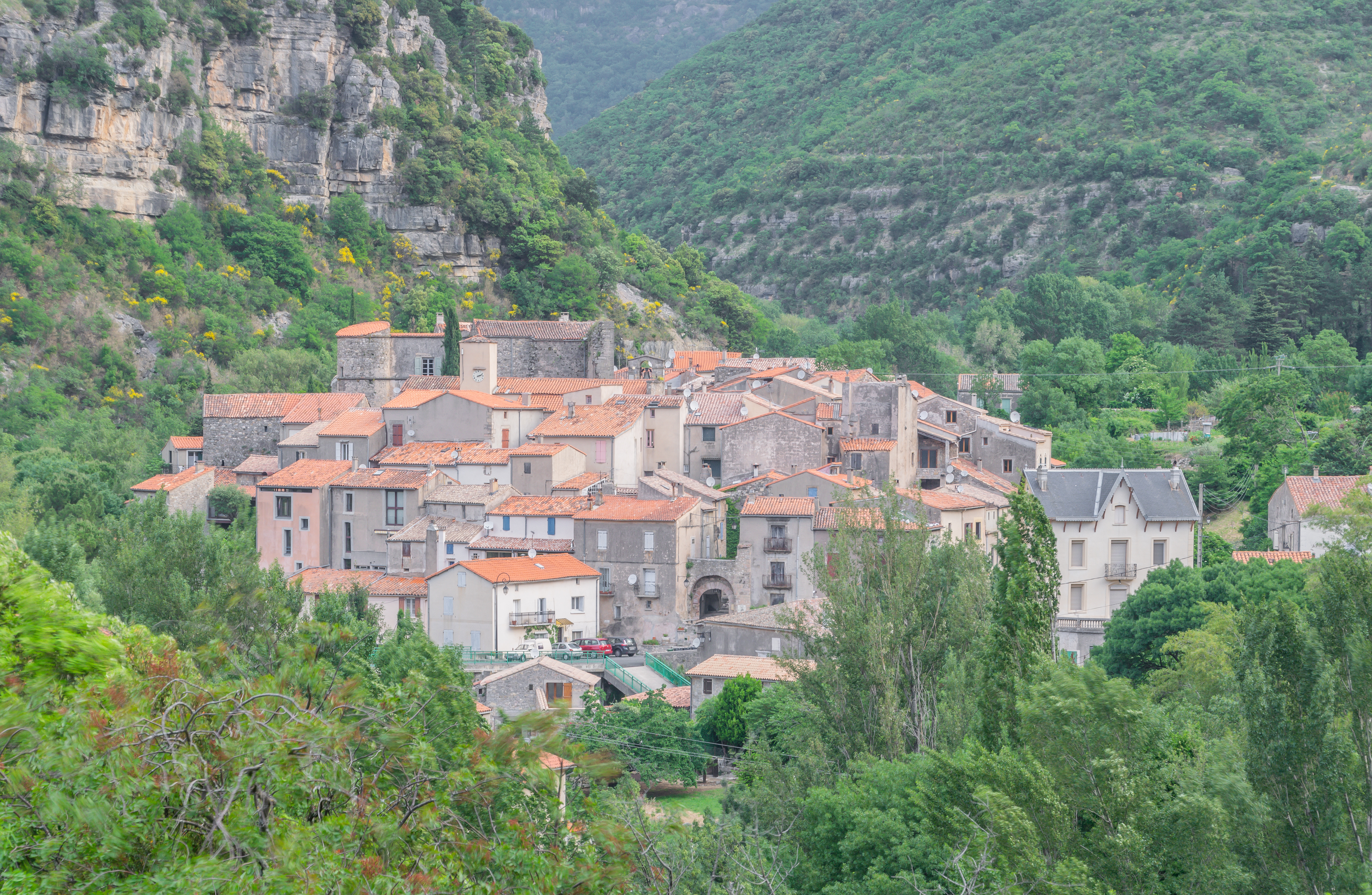
- Location of Pégairolles-de-l'Escalette
- Location within France Location within Occitanie
- Coordinates: 43°48′13″N 3°19′25″E
- Country: France
- Region: Occitania
- Department: Hérault
- Arrondissement: Lodève
- Canton: Lodève
- Intercommunality: Lodévois - Larzac

Government
  - Mayor (2020–2026): Frédéric Roig
- Area^{1}: 32.13 km^{2} (12.41 sq mi)
- Elevation: 315 m (1,033 ft)
- Highest elevation: 822 m (2,697 ft)
- Lowest elevation: 223 m (732 ft)
- Population (2023): 151
  - Density: 4.70/km^{2} (12.2/sq mi)
- Time zone: UTC+01:00 (CET)
  - Summer (DST): UTC+02:00 (CEST)
- INSEE/Postal code: 34196 /34700
- ^{1} French Land Register data, which excludes lakes, ponds, glaciers > 1 km^{2} (0.386 sq mi or 247 acres) and river estuaries.

Pégairolles-de-l'Escalette (French pronunciation: [peɡɛʁɔl də lɛskalɛt]; Languedocien: Pegairòlas de l'Escaleta) is a commune in the Hérault department in the Occitanie region in southern France. It is at the foot of the Larzac plateau.

== Administration ==
List of recent mayors
From	To	Name	Party
March 2001	2026	Frédéric Roig	Parti Socialiste

== Population ==
Historical population
Year	Pop.	±% p.a.
1968	168	—
1975	157	−0.96%
1982	159	+0.18%
1990	141	−1.49%
1999	137	−0.32%
2007	149	+1.06%
2012	139	−1.38%
2017	159	+2.73%
2023	151	−0.86%
Source: INSEE

== Sights ==
- Cave Coopérative
- Arboretum du Mas du Rouquet

== See also ==
- Communes of the Hérault department
