= Neal I. Rosenthal =

American author & wine merchant

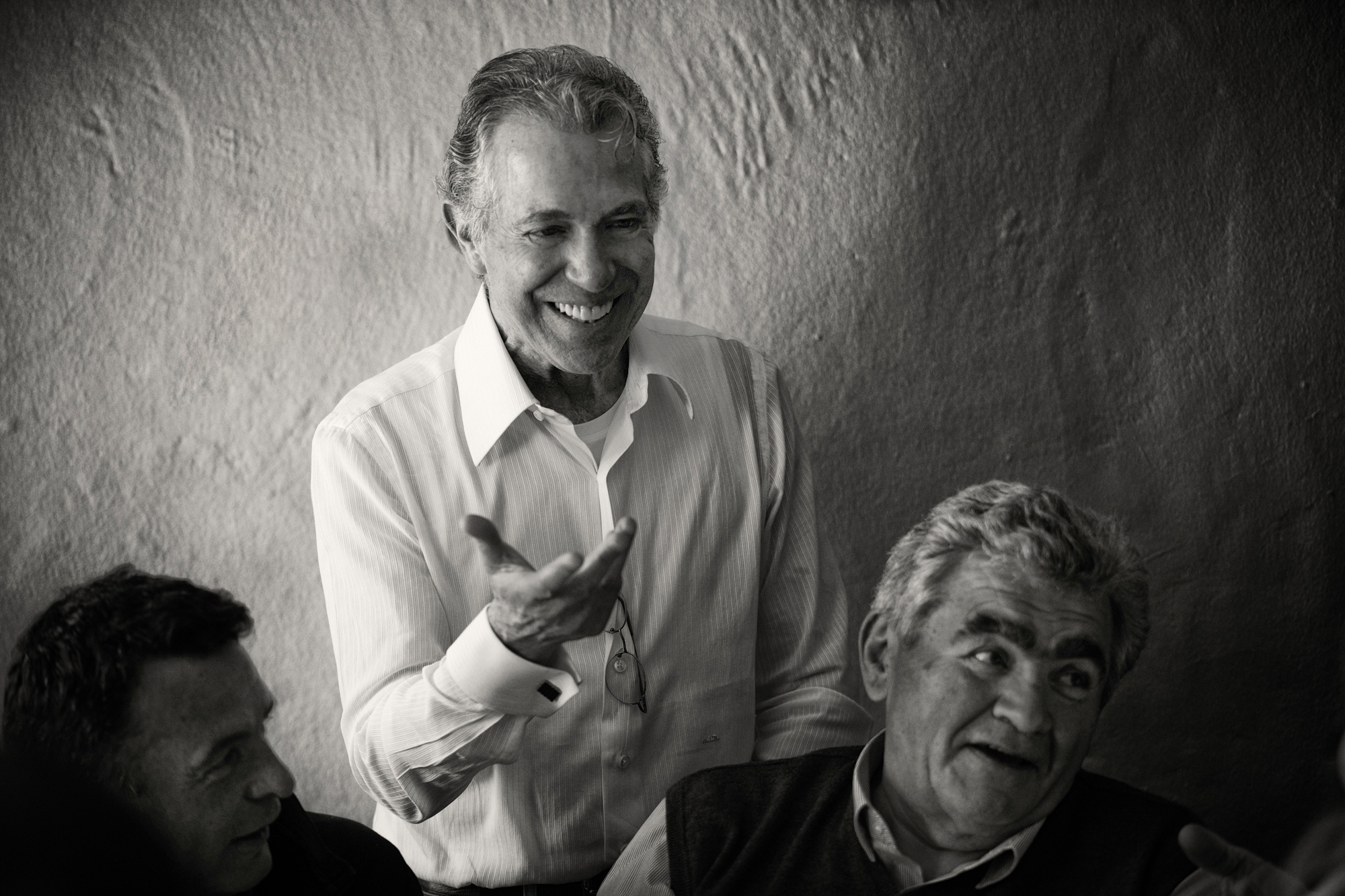
- Born: October 14, 1945 (age 80); New York City, United States
- Education: Rutgers University, New York University, Columbia University
- Occupations: Author wine merchant
- Years active: 1977–present
- Spouse: Kerry Madigan (m. 2002)

Neal I. Rosenthal (born 1945) is an American author, entrepreneur, and wine merchant.

== Early life ==
Neal I. Rosenthal was born in New York City in 1945 and was educated at Rutgers University (B.A.), Columbia University (J.D.), and New York University (LL.M.).

== Career ==
Neal I. Rosenthal is the founder of Rosenthal Wine Merchant (RWM) and The Mad Rose Group (MRG). RWM imports and distributes limited production, estate-bottled wines from Western Europe. This endeavor began in 1977 as a one-man retail operation in New York City, when Neal stepped away from his law practice to conceive a project that would operate outside the mainstream wine business with special emphasis on supporting artisanal, family-owned and operated wine estates. Neal was joined shortly thereafter by Kerry Madigan, who later became his partner and wife. The two have spent decades working with those who share the RWM passion for terroir, collaborating with growers in France, Italy, Switzerland and Catalonia who produce limited quantities of the finest quality wines. MRG now includes Mad Rose Specialty Foods (importer, distributor and direct-to-consumer purveyor of Italian and French food specialties, including extra virgin olive oils), Mad Rose Journeys, curated and intimate travel experiences in France, Italy, and Switzerland inspired by Neal's deep connections to the people, sights, and tastes of these storied places; and La Closerie les Capucines, a 17th-century stone maison d’hôte in Arbois in the Jura region of France that welcomes travelers from around the world,

In 2006, Neal created The Mad Rose Foundation, a charitable organization that supports among other objectives public school education, literary organizations, free speech initiatives, and programs to protect the environment. Currently, the Foundation is underwriting a study abroad program in Benin in West Africa in collaboration with Rutgers University.

== Achievements ==
Neal is the author of Reflections of a Wine Merchant, published by Farrar, Straus & Giroux in 2008. He is featured in the documentary film Mondovino that debuted at the Cannes Film Festival in 2004.

In 2012, Neal was nominated for an Outstanding Wine & Spirits Professional Award by the James Beard Foundation Award.

In 2019, Neal was awarded honorary citizenship in the village of Carema in northwestern Piedmont in Italy in recognition of his efforts to promote the rare wines of that region.
