= Octon, Hérault =

Octon
- Commune
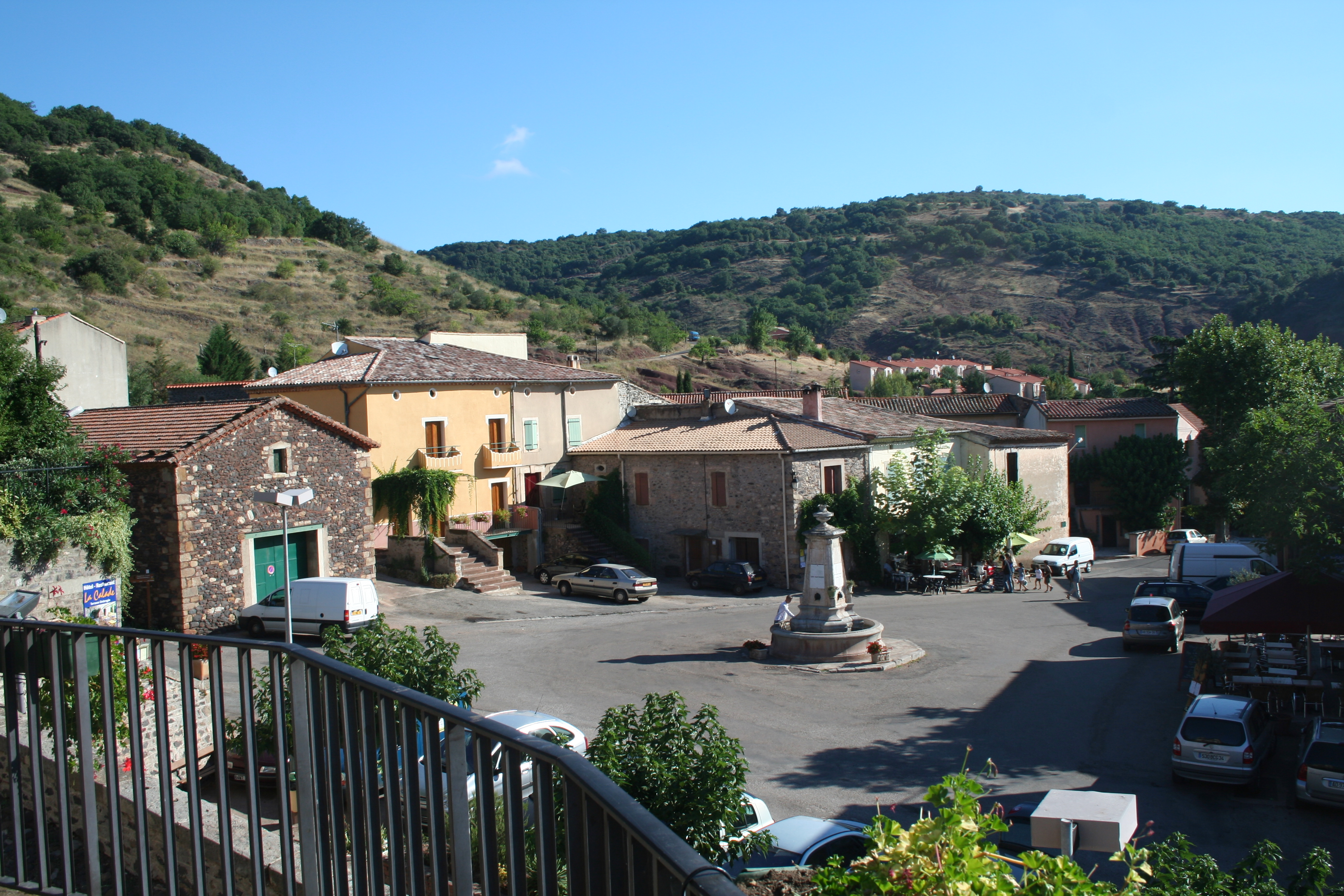
- The main square in Octon

- Coat of arms
- Location of Octon
- Location within France Location within Occitanie
- Coordinates: 43°39′18″N 3°18′12″E
- Country: France
- Region: Occitania
- Department: Hérault
- Arrondissement: Lodève
- Canton: Clermont-l'Hérault
- Intercommunality: Clermontais

Government
  - Mayor (2020–2026): Bernard Coste
- Area^{1}: 21.81 km^{2} (8.42 sq mi)
- Elevation: 125 m (410 ft)
- Highest elevation: 700 m (2,300 ft)
- Lowest elevation: 134 m (440 ft)
- Population (2023): 521
  - Density: 23.9/km^{2} (61.9/sq mi)
- Time zone: UTC+01:00 (CET)
  - Summer (DST): UTC+02:00 (CEST)
- INSEE/Postal code: 34186 /34800
- ^{1} French Land Register data, which excludes lakes, ponds, glaciers > 1 km^{2} (0.386 sq mi or 247 acres) and river estuaries.

Octon (French pronunciation: [ɔktɔ̃]; Occitan: Auton) is a commune in the Hérault department in the Occitanie region in southern France.

== Geography ==
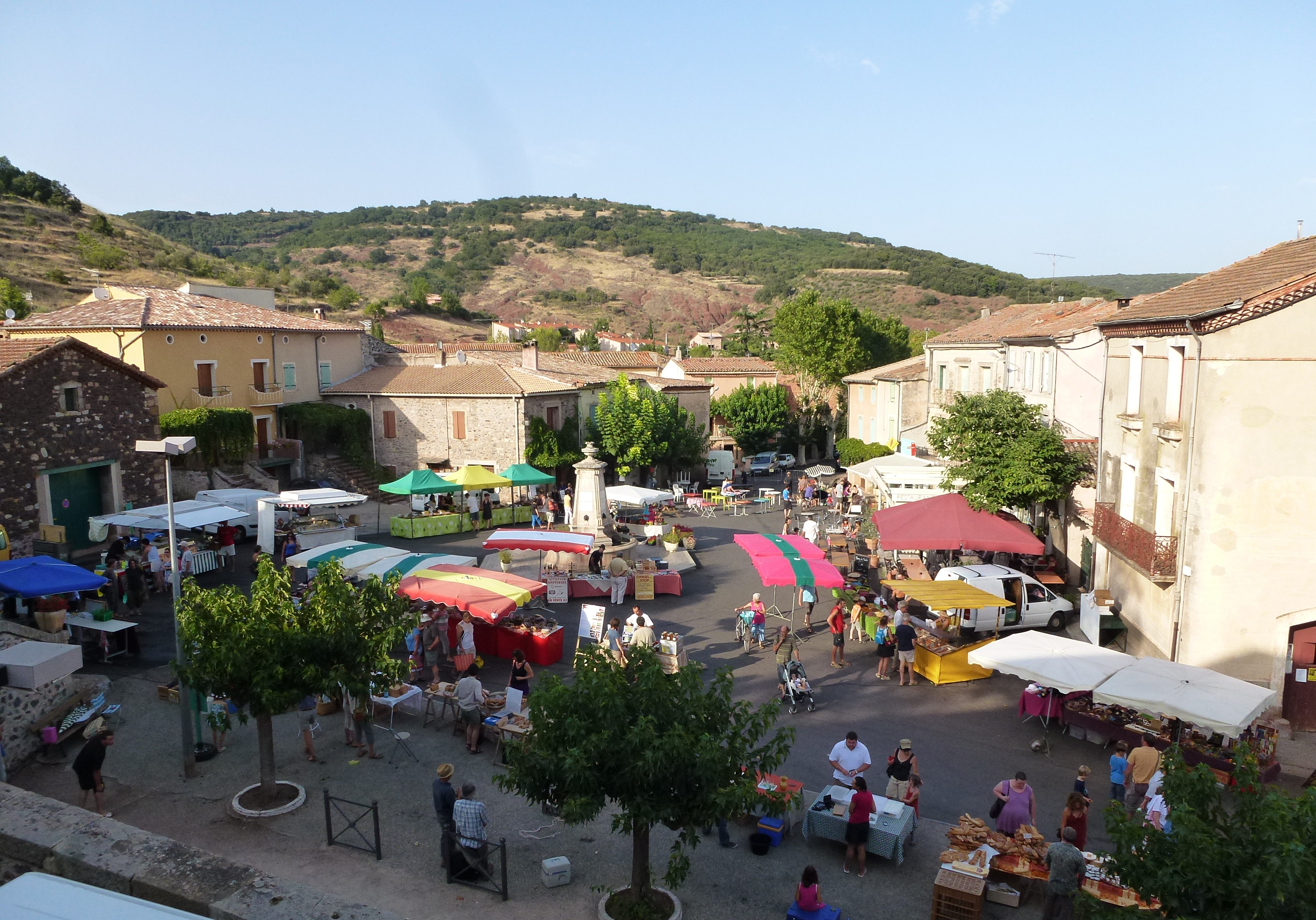
Market in Octon 2012

=== Climate ===
Octon has a mediterranean climate (Köppen climate classification Csa). The average annual temperature in Octon is 14.9 °C (58.8 °F). The average annual rainfall is 942.8 mm (37.12 in) with October as the wettest month. The temperatures are highest on average in July, at around 23.7 °C (74.7 °F), and lowest in January, at around 7.2 °C (45.0 °F). The highest temperature ever recorded in Octon was 40.6 °C (105.1 °F) on 12 August 2003; the coldest temperature ever recorded was −7.2 °C (19.0 °F) on 28 February 2018.

Climate data for Octon (1981–2010 averages, extremes 1998−present)
Month	Jan	Feb	Mar	Apr	May	Jun	Jul	Aug	Sep	Oct	Nov	Dec	Year
Record high °C (°F)	21.1 (70.0)	22.4 (72.3)	27.6 (81.7)	31.9 (89.4)	34.7 (94.5)	39.8 (103.6)	37.6 (99.7)	40.6 (105.1)	36.5 (97.7)	31.8 (89.2)	25.7 (78.3)	21.1 (70.0)	40.6 (105.1)
Mean daily maximum °C (°F)	10.8 (51.4)	11.7 (53.1)	15.4 (59.7)	18.5 (65.3)	22.5 (72.5)	27.5 (81.5)	29.7 (85.5)	29.3 (84.7)	24.7 (76.5)	19.5 (67.1)	14.1 (57.4)	11.1 (52.0)	19.6 (67.3)
Daily mean °C (°F)	7.2 (45.0)	7.7 (45.9)	10.8 (51.4)	13.6 (56.5)	17.4 (63.3)	21.6 (70.9)	23.7 (74.7)	23.5 (74.3)	19.4 (66.9)	15.6 (60.1)	10.5 (50.9)	7.5 (45.5)	14.9 (58.8)
Mean daily minimum °C (°F)	3.7 (38.7)	3.8 (38.8)	6.1 (43.0)	8.7 (47.7)	12.2 (54.0)	15.8 (60.4)	17.8 (64.0)	17.6 (63.7)	14.2 (57.6)	11.7 (53.1)	6.9 (44.4)	3.9 (39.0)	10.2 (50.4)
Record low °C (°F)	−5.4 (22.3)	−7.2 (19.0)	−6.9 (19.6)	1.7 (35.1)	2.7 (36.9)	8.1 (46.6)	9.6 (49.3)	11.1 (52.0)	5.7 (42.3)	−1.0 (30.2)	−5.5 (22.1)	−5.8 (21.6)	−7.2 (19.0)
Average precipitation mm (inches)	87.2 (3.43)	86.1 (3.39)	53.4 (2.10)	86.8 (3.42)	67.3 (2.65)	43.3 (1.70)	22.9 (0.90)	43.0 (1.69)	88.5 (3.48)	144.5 (5.69)	116.2 (4.57)	103.6 (4.08)	942.8 (37.12)
Average precipitation days (≥ 1.0 mm)	7.5	6.3	5.7	7.0	6.4	4.6	2.5	3.9	5.0	7.6	6.7	6.8	69.9
Source: Meteociel

== Heraldry ==
Arms of Octon	divided per pale argent to an oak vert, and gules to a cross clechée, voided and pommée or (Occitan cross), to a bend argent charged with the word ALOUTOU sable superimposed on the line of partition.

In reality, this mention Aloutou = Al Outou: "at (the) Octon" in Mistralian orthography. The regular Occitan spelling is Oton pronounced "Outou".

== Population ==
Historical population
Year	Pop.	±% p.a.
1968	253	—
1975	220	−1.98%
1982	243	+1.43%
1990	350	+4.67%
1999	397	+1.41%
2007	415	+0.56%
2012	459	+2.04%
2017	527	+2.80%
2023	521	−0.19%
Source: INSEE

== See also ==
- Communes of the Hérault department
- Lake Salagou
- Salagou
