= Le Bosc, Hérault =

Le Bosc
- Commune
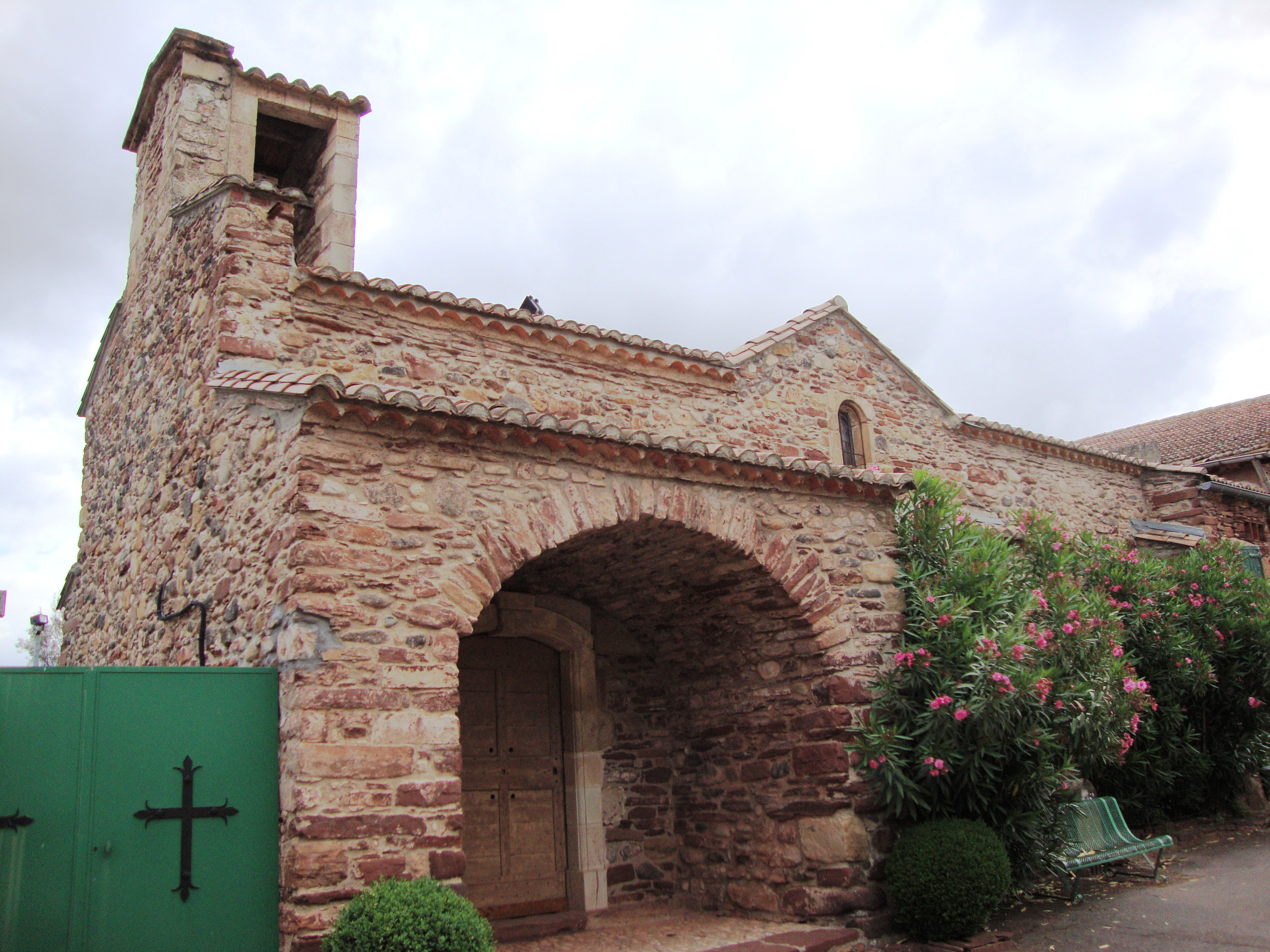
- Church of Saint-Fréchoux
- Location of Le Bosc
- Location within France Location within Occitanie
- Coordinates: 43°42′29″N 3°23′47″E
- Country: France
- Region: Occitania
- Department: Hérault
- Arrondissement: Lodève
- Canton: Lodève

Government
  - Mayor (2021–2026): Jérôme Valat
- Area^{1}: 28.13 km^{2} (10.86 sq mi)
- Elevation: 90 m (300 ft)
- Highest elevation: 432 m (1,417 ft)
- Lowest elevation: 56 m (184 ft)
- Population (2023): 1,435
  - Density: 51.01/km^{2} (132.1/sq mi)
- Time zone: UTC+01:00 (CET)
  - Summer (DST): UTC+02:00 (CEST)
- INSEE/Postal code: 34036 /34700
- ^{1} French Land Register data, which excludes lakes, ponds, glaciers > 1 km^{2} (0.386 sq mi or 247 acres) and river estuaries.

Le Bosc (French pronunciation: [lə bɔsk]; Occitan: Lo Bòsc) is a commune in the Hérault department in southern France.

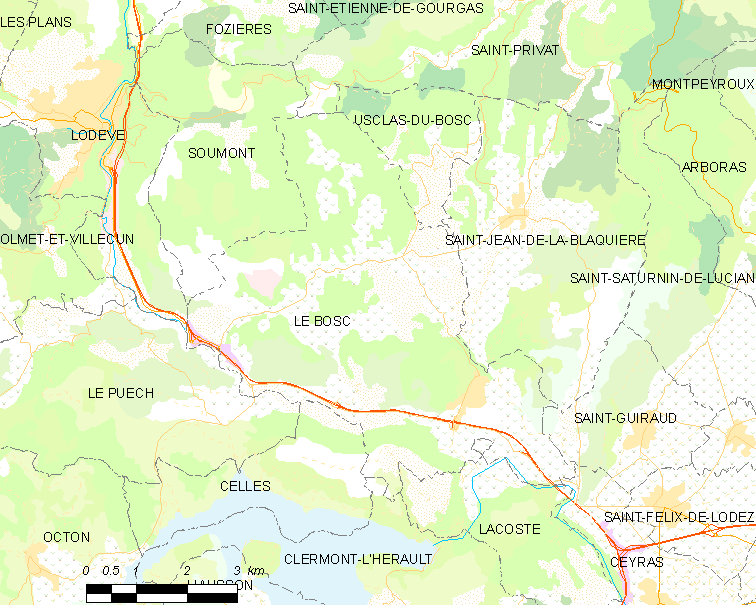
Map

== Population ==
Historical population
Year	Pop.	±% p.a.
1968	658	—
1975	587	−1.62%
1982	651	+1.49%
1990	679	+0.53%
1999	739	+0.95%
2007	1,090	+4.98%
2012	1,275	+3.19%
2017	1,345	+1.07%
2023	1,435	+1.09%
Source: INSEE

== See also ==
- Communes of the Hérault department
- Salagou
