= Mérifons =

- Commune
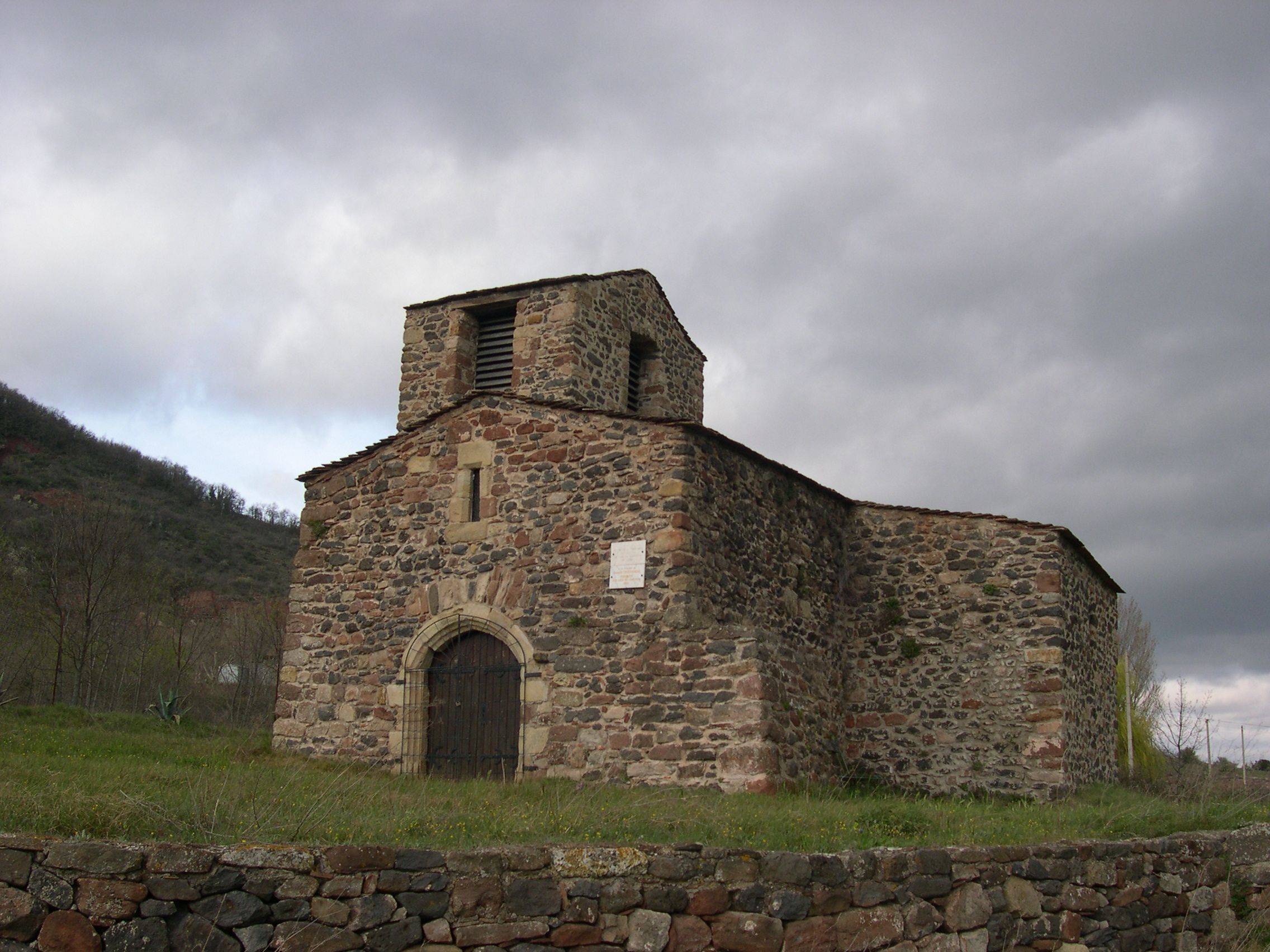
- Church Saint-Pierre-es-Liens
- Location of Mérifons
- Location within France Location within Occitanie
- Coordinates: 43°38′08″N 3°17′10″E
- Country: France
- Region: Occitania
- Department: Hérault
- Arrondissement: Lodève
- Canton: Clermont-l'Hérault
- Intercommunality: Clermontais

Government
  - Mayor (2020–2026): Sophie Costeau
- Area^{1}: 6.74 km^{2} (2.60 sq mi)
- Elevation: 180 m (590 ft)
- Highest elevation: 452 m (1,483 ft)
- Lowest elevation: 157 m (515 ft)
- Population (2023): 62
  - Density: 9.2/km^{2} (24/sq mi)
- Time zone: UTC+01:00 (CET)
  - Summer (DST): UTC+02:00 (CEST)
- INSEE/Postal code: 34156 /34800
- ^{1} French Land Register data, which excludes lakes, ponds, glaciers > 1 km^{2} (0.386 sq mi or 247 acres) and river estuaries.

Mérifons (Languedocien: Merifonts) is a commune in the Hérault department in southern France.

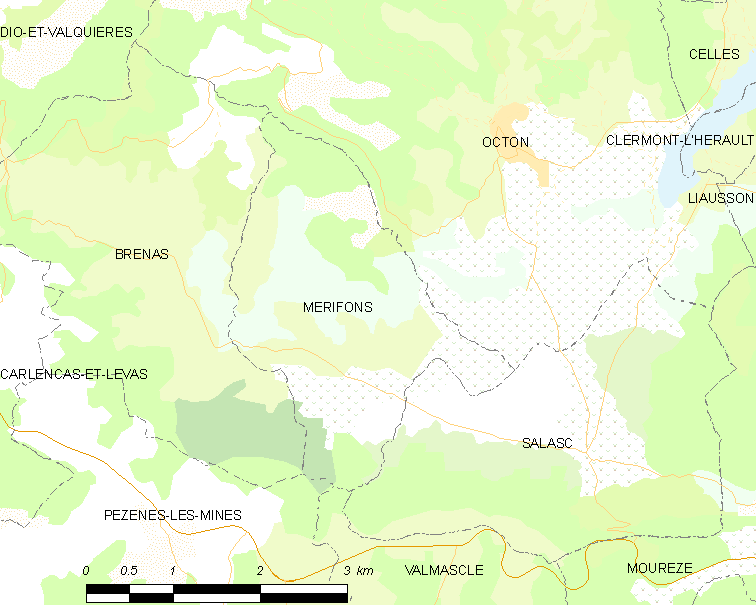
Map

== Population ==
Historical population
Year	Pop.	±% p.a.
1968	47	—
1975	42	−1.59%
1982	29	−5.15%
1990	29	+0.00%
1999	26	−1.21%
2007	50	+8.52%
2012	49	−0.40%
2017	43	−2.58%
2023	62	+6.29%
Source: INSEE

== See also ==
- Communes of the Hérault department
- Salagou
