= Celles, Hérault =

Celles
- Commune
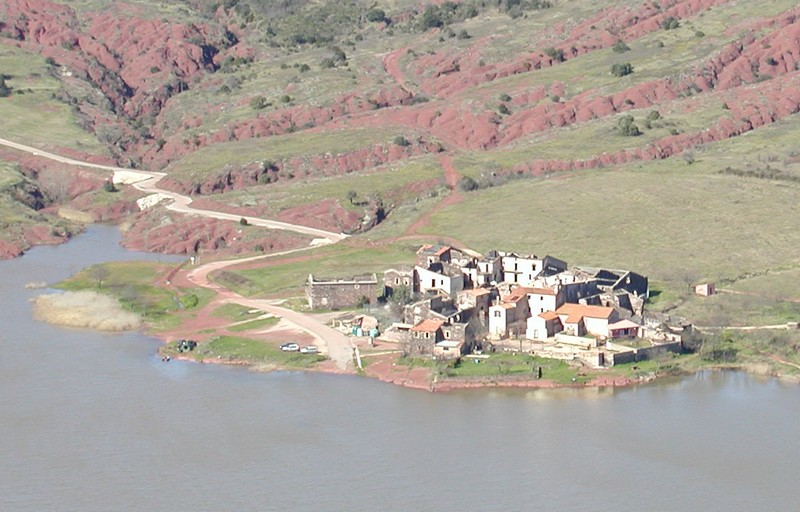
- Celles
- Location of Celles
- Location within France Location within Occitanie
- Coordinates: 43°39′41″N 03°20′27″E
- Country: France
- Region: Occitania
- Department: Hérault
- Arrondissement: Lodève
- Canton: Lodève
- Intercommunality: Lodévois et Larzac

Government
  - Mayor (2026–32): Tom Brière
- Area^{1}: 7.56 km^{2} (2.92 sq mi)
- Elevation: 100 m (330 ft)
- Highest elevation: 350 m (1,150 ft)
- Lowest elevation: 89 m (292 ft)
- Population (2023): 26
  - Density: 3.4/km^{2} (8.9/sq mi)
- Time zone: UTC+01:00 (CET)
  - Summer (DST): UTC+02:00 (CEST)
- INSEE/Postal code: 34072 /34700
- ^{1} French Land Register data, which excludes lakes, ponds, glaciers > 1 km^{2} (0.386 sq mi or 247 acres) and river estuaries.

Celles (French pronunciation: [sɛl]; Occitan: Cèlas) is a commune in the Hérault department in southern France.

== History ==
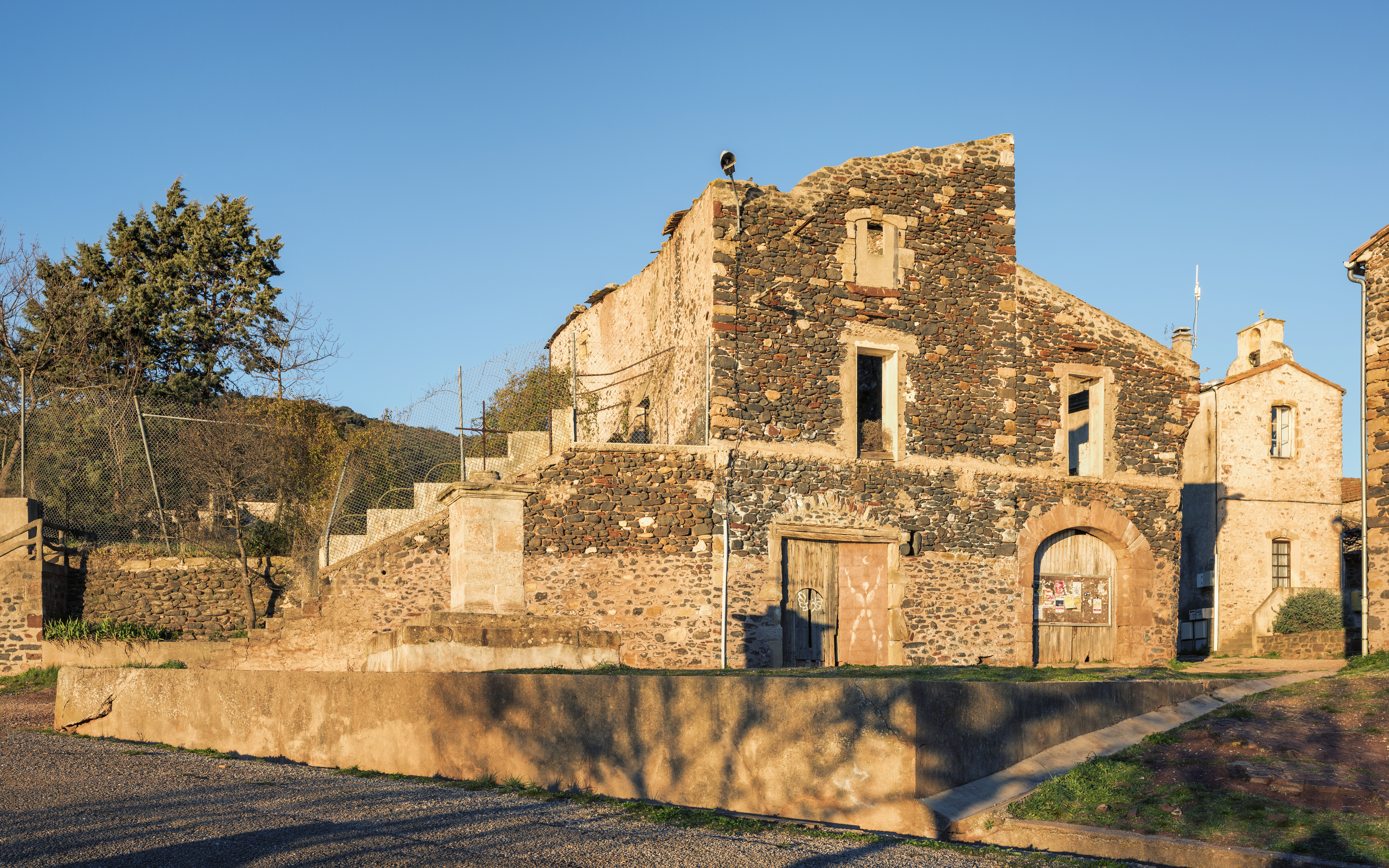
Abandoned stone house in Celles in 2019

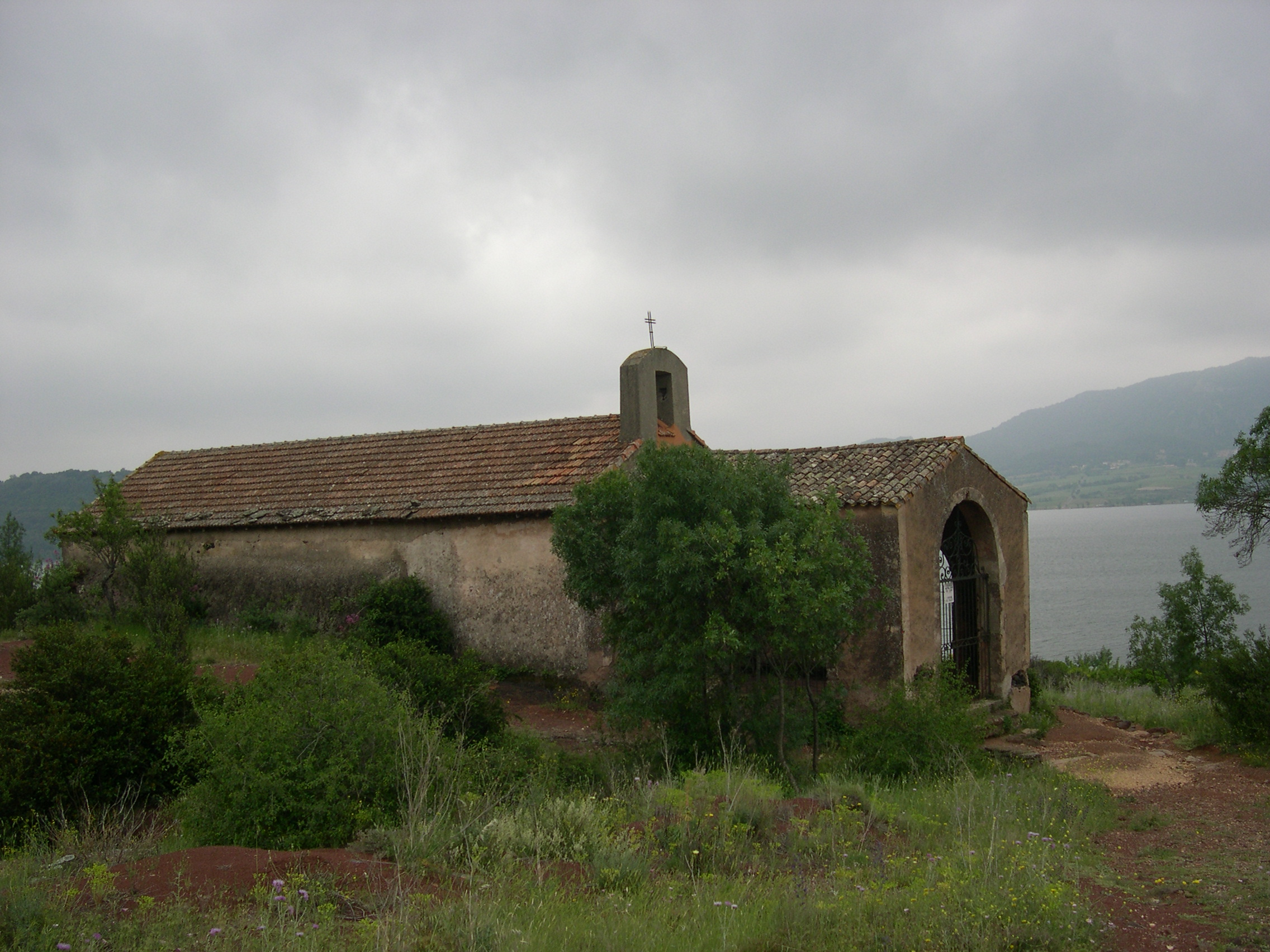
Chapel of Notre-Dame-des-Clans

The village sits on the bank of Lake Salagou. When the dam that created the lake was built (1964–68), the intention was to raise the water level in two stages—first to 139m, then to 150m. The second stage would have engulfed the village of Celles, which is at a mean altitude of 144m, and accordingly the village and its vineyards were officially abandoned. The first stage of water level left the water lapping at the foot of the village without encroaching on any structures. The second stage was never implemented, so a few villagers re-occupied the Mairie, repairing public buildings in order that the status of Celles as a commune would be preserved. However, the French authorities allowed the village to decay and all buildings except the Mairie and the church went to ruin and vandalism, the roof tiles steadily disappearing. It became a popular place for fishing and picnics.

In 1990, the city council, hoping to "move" the department to revitalize the village, called on the general council, owner of the ruins, to secure them in the name of public safety. The expected result - the restoration of the houses - actually led to a crystallization action of the village, with a concreting of the ridges and laying fences around the houses. It was not until 1996 that the department took the official decision to permanently maintain the rating 139. From the beginning, some of the former inhabitants fought to maintain the status of commune in Celles, and regularly maintained and renovated communal buildings, not expropriable

== Repopulation ==
In September 2017 a scheme was announced for the repopulation of Celles. The village was partially rebuilt and reconnected to the water and electricity systems, In the years 2020 a more comprehensivee repopulation plan was approved. French citizens were allowed to occupy structures in the village at no cost provided that they did their own repairs and planned to work in the village. The permits were for 35 years but the new inhabitants will never actually own the property. By 2023 the official population had increased to 26 from a low of five in 1975.

Specific safeguards against overtourism were enforced. For example, there can never be a hotel or gite in the village.

The commune is also home to the chapel of Notre-Dame-des-Clans. Built from local stone, the chapel contains elements dating from the 14th and 15th centuries. It has a single nave and is dedicated to the Virgin Mary. Although normally closed to the public, it remains a pilgrimage site where an annual Mass and procession are held on the Feast of the Assumption.

== Population ==
Historical population
Year	Pop.	±% p.a.
1968	29	—
1975	5	−22.21%
1982	10	+10.41%
1990	14	+4.30%
1999	20	+4.04%
2007	26	+3.33%
2012	29	+2.21%
2017	32	+1.99%
2023	26	−3.40%
Source: INSEE

== Politics and administration ==
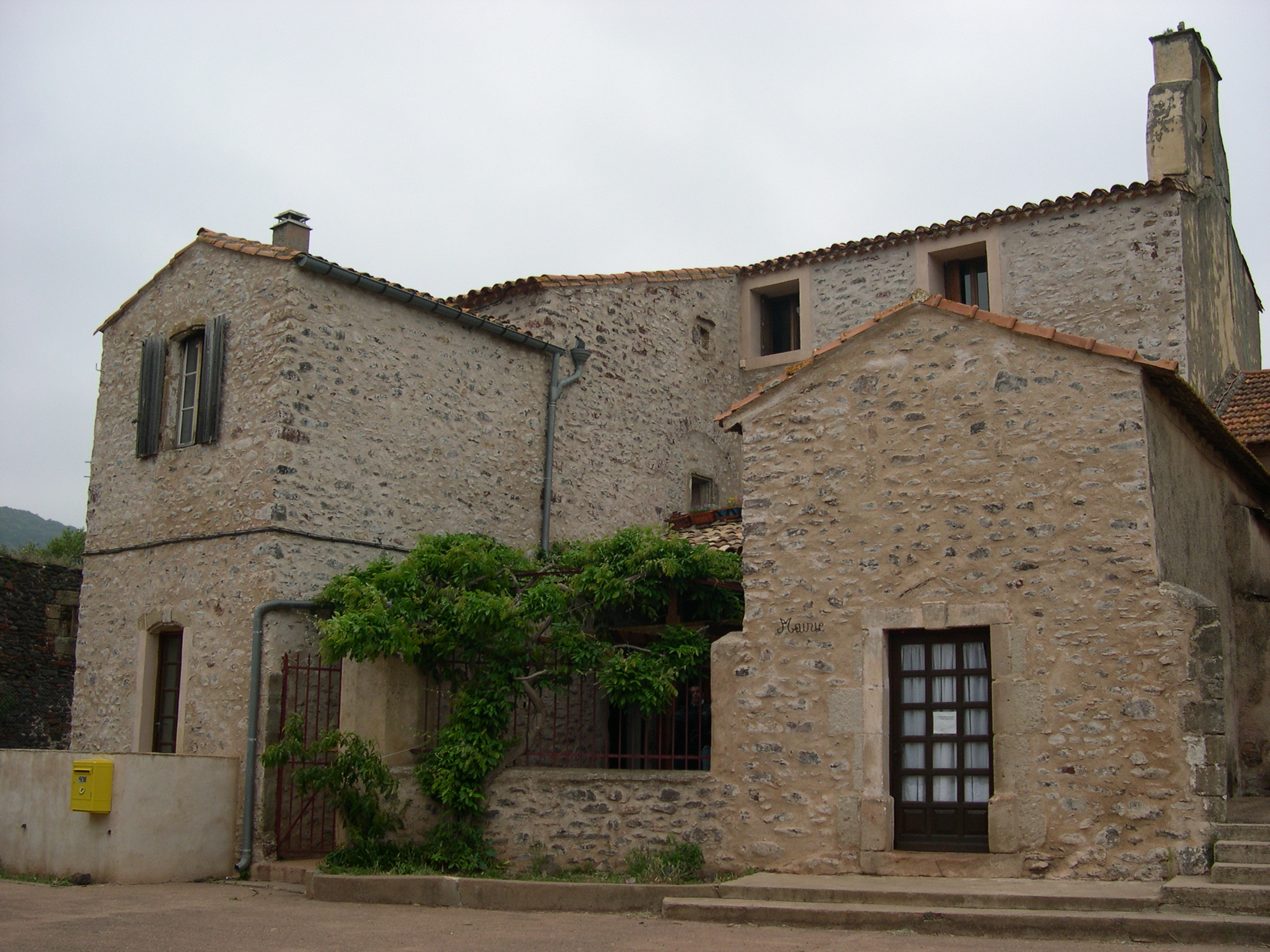
Town hall of Celles

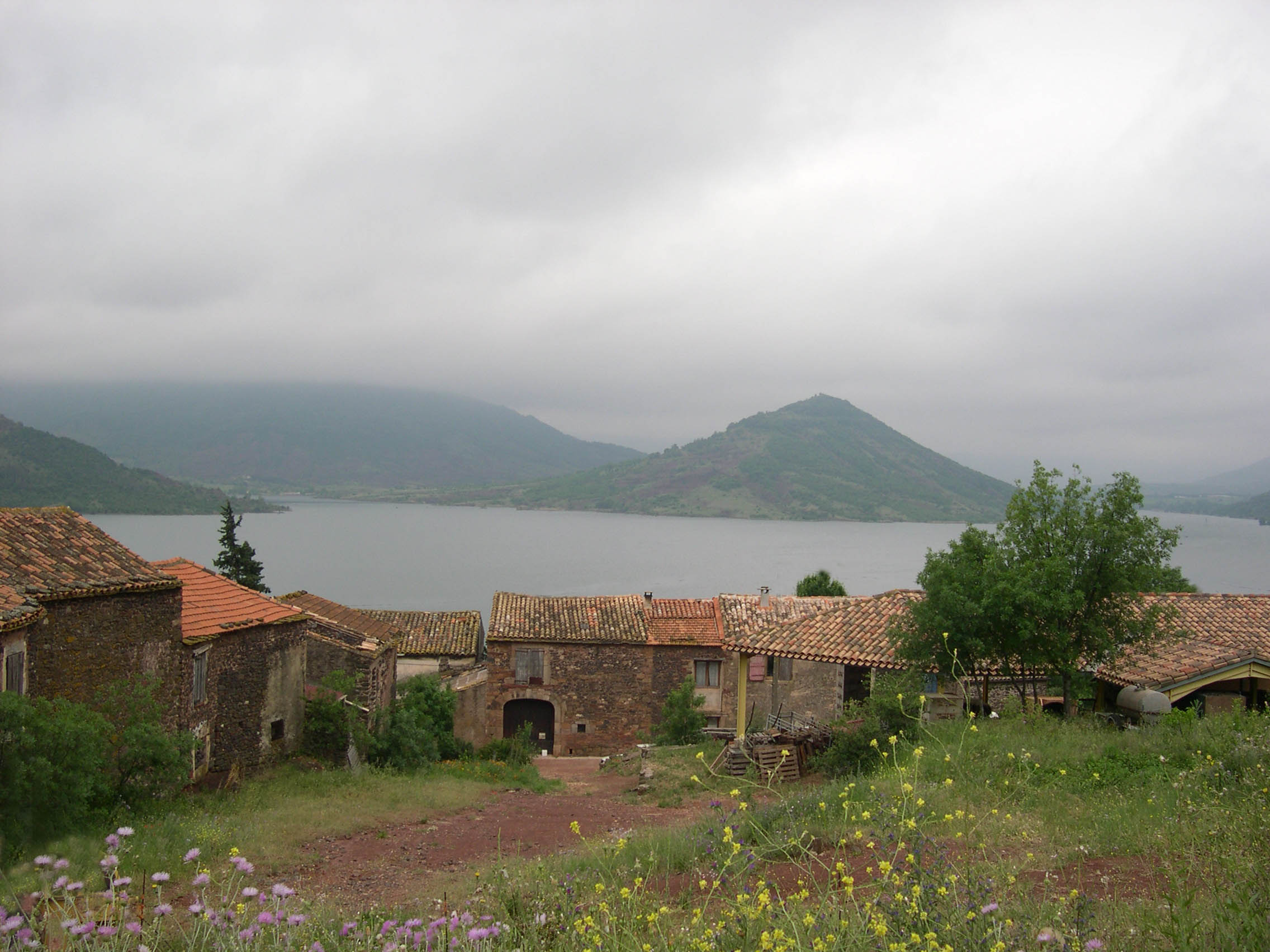
Les Vailhés hamlet

Election	Mayor	Party	Occupation
1971	Henri Goudal	SE	
1977	Henri Goudal	SE	
1983	Henri Goudal	SE	
1989	Henri Goudal	SE	
1995	Joëlle Goudal	SE	Trader
2001	Joëlle Goudal	SE	Trader
2008	Joëlle Goudal	SE	Trader
2014	Joëlle Goudal	SE	Trader
2020	Joëlle Goudal	SE	Trader
2026	Tom Brière	DVG	Sailing and kayaking instructor

== Cinema ==
The ruined village has served as a backdrop for several feature film scenes, notably the 1986 thriller Zone rouge (Red Zone).

== See also ==
- Communes of the Hérault department
