= Jonquières, Hérault =

Jonquières
- Commune
- Coat of arms
- Location of Jonquières
- Location within France Location within Occitanie
- Coordinates: 43°40′34″N 3°28′35″E
- Country: France
- Region: Occitania
- Department: Hérault
- Arrondissement: Lodève
- Canton: Gignac
- Intercommunality: Vallée de l'Hérault

Government
  - Mayor (2020–2026): Bernard Gouzin
- Area^{1}: 2.05 km^{2} (0.79 sq mi)
- Highest elevation: 126 m (413 ft)
- Lowest elevation: 94 m (308 ft)
- Population (2023): 590
  - Density: 290/km^{2} (750/sq mi)
- Time zone: UTC+01:00 (CET)
  - Summer (DST): UTC+02:00 (CEST)
- INSEE/Postal code: 34122 /34725
- ^{1} French Land Register data, which excludes lakes, ponds, glaciers > 1 km^{2} (0.386 sq mi or 247 acres) and river estuaries.

Jonquières (French pronunciation: [ʒɔ̃kjɛʁ]; Occitan: Jonquièiras) is a commune in the Hérault département in the Occitanie region in southern France.

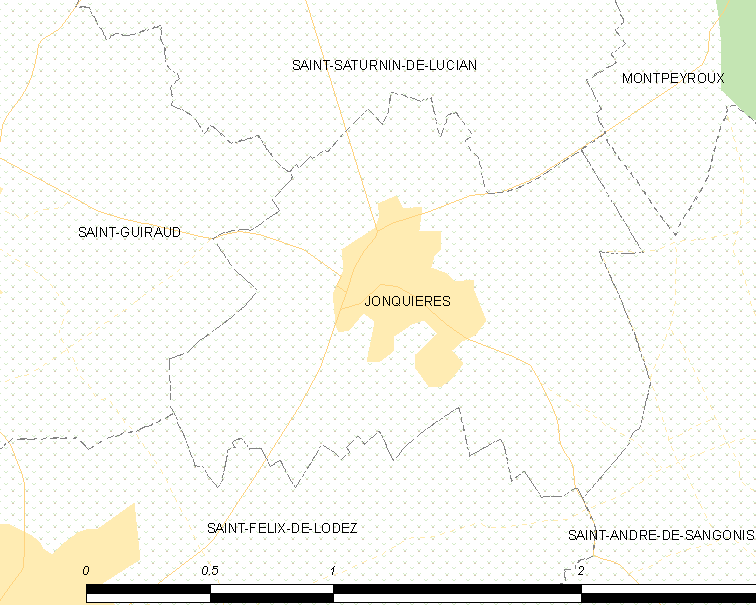
Map

== Population ==
Historical population
Year	Pop.	±% p.a.
1968	316	—
1975	270	−2.22%
1982	286	+0.83%
1990	299	+0.56%
1999	355	+1.93%
2007	376	+0.72%
2012	393	+0.89%
2017	476	+3.91%
2023	590	+3.64%
Source: INSEE

== See also ==
- Communes of the Hérault department
