= Canton of Olargues =

Coordinates: 43°32′50″N 3°00′22″E

Olargues
- Former canton
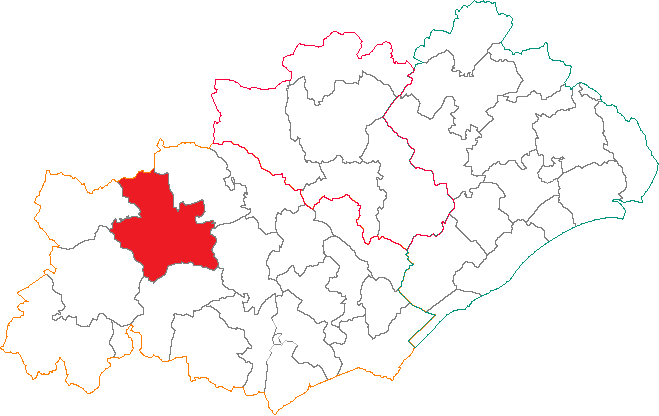
- Country: France
- Region: Occitania
- Department: Hérault
- No. of communes: {{{nbcomm}}}
- Disbanded: 2015
- Population (2012): 4,416

The Canton of Olargues is a former subdivision of the French department of Hérault, and its subdivision, the Arrondissement of Béziers. It had 4,416 inhabitants (2012). It was disbanded following the French canton reorganisation which came into effect in March 2015. It consisted of 13 communes, which joined the canton of Saint-Pons-de-Thomières in 2015.

== Municipalities ==
The canton comprised the following communes:

- Berlou
- Cambon-et-Salvergues
- Colombières-sur-Orb
- Ferrières-Poussarou
- Mons
- Olargues
- Prémian
- Roquebrun
- Saint-Étienne-d'Albagnan
- Saint-Julien
- Saint-Martin-de-l'Arçon
- Saint-Vincent-d'Olargues
- Vieussan

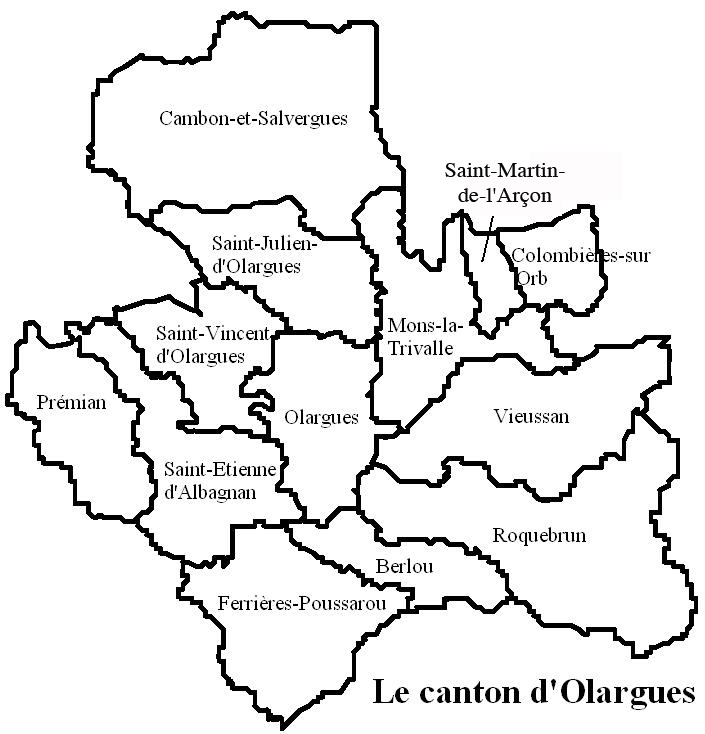
image_map

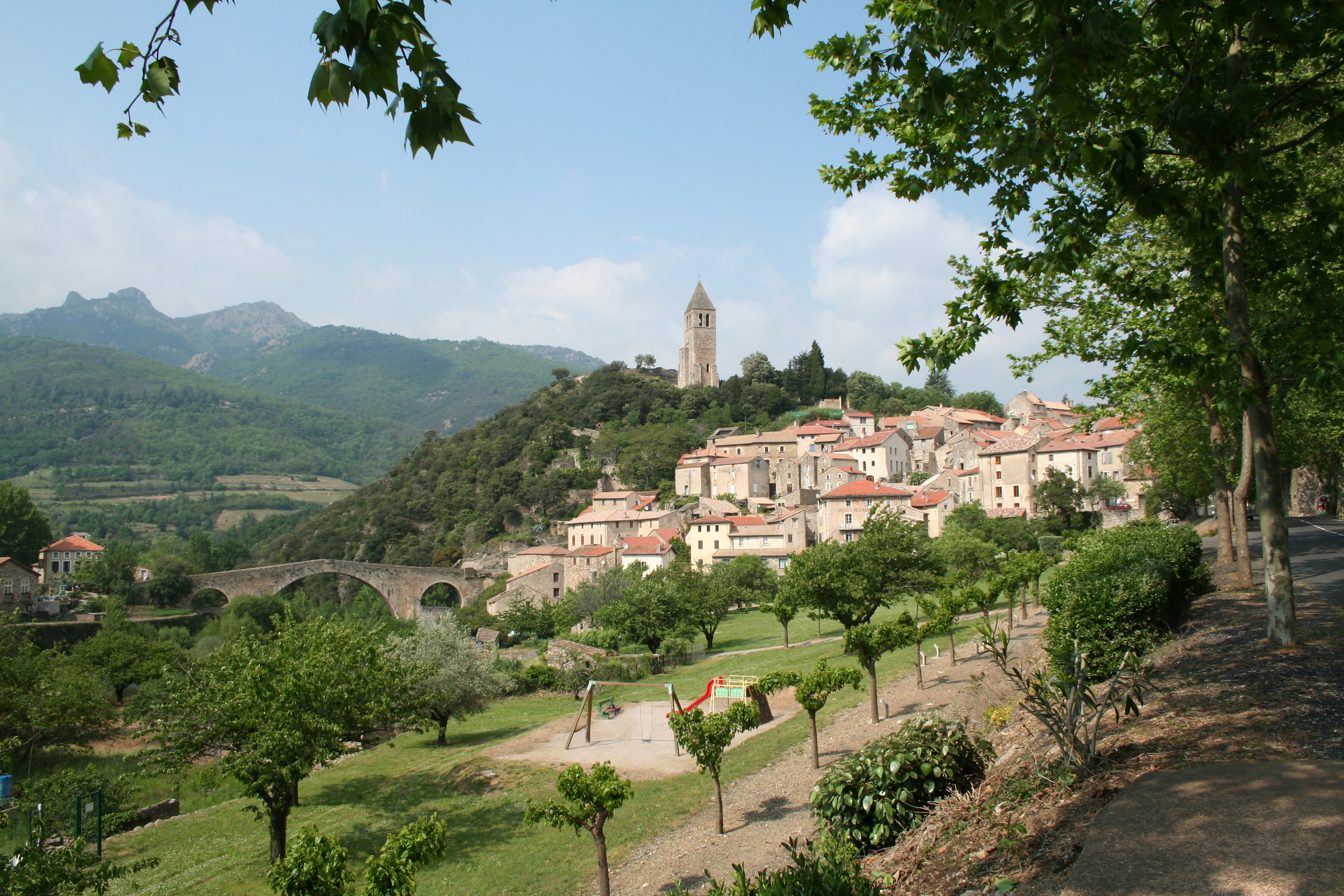
Olargues

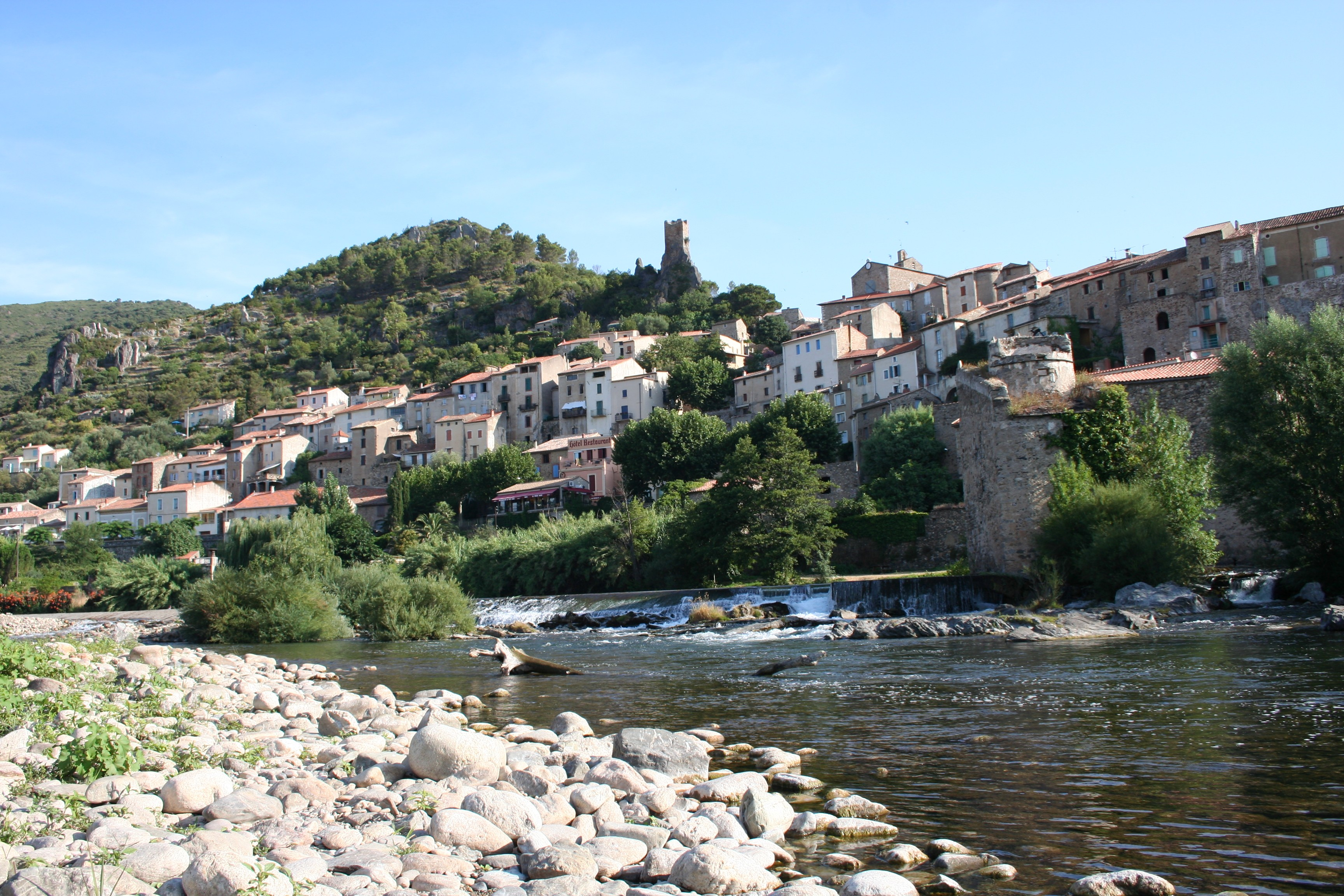
Roquebrun
