= Canton of Saint-Chinian =

Coordinates: 43°23′52″N 2°56′20″E

Saint-Chinian
- Former canton
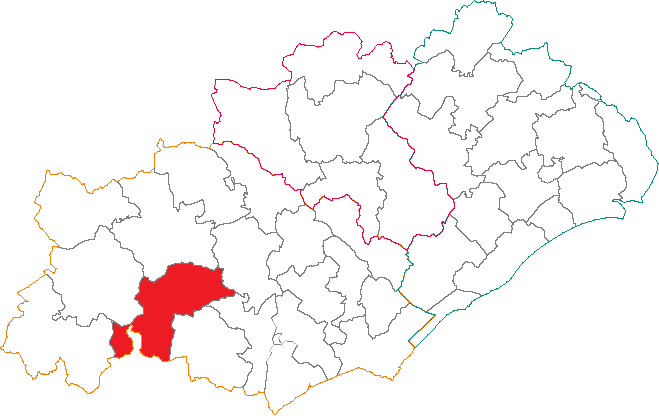
- Country: France
- Region: Occitania
- Department: Hérault
- No. of communes: {{{nbcomm}}}
- Disbanded: 2015
- Area: 219 km^{2} (85 sq mi)
- Population (2012): 8,138
  - Density: 37.2/km^{2} (96.2/sq mi)

The Canton of Saint-Chinian is a former subdivision of the French department of Hérault, and its subdivision, the Arrondissement of Béziers. It had 8,138 inhabitants (2012). It was disbanded following the French canton reorganisation which came into effect in March 2015. It consisted of 13 communes, which joined the canton of Saint-Pons-de-Thomières in 2015.

== Municipalities ==
The canton comprised the following communes:

- Agel
- Aigues-Vives
- Assignan
- Babeau-Bouldoux
- Cazedarnes
- Cébazan
- Cessenon-sur-Orb
- Cruzy
- Montouliers
- Pierrerue
- Prades-sur-Vernazobre
- Saint-Chinian
- Villespassans

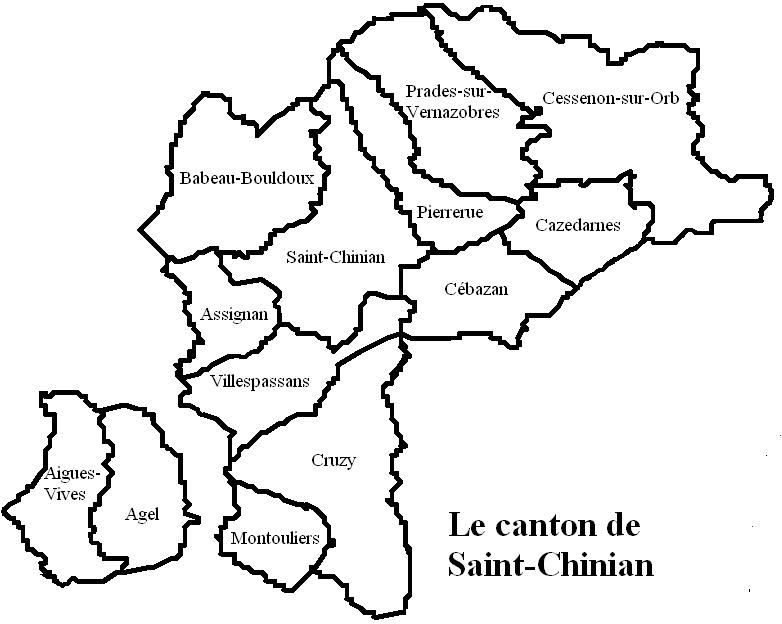
image_map

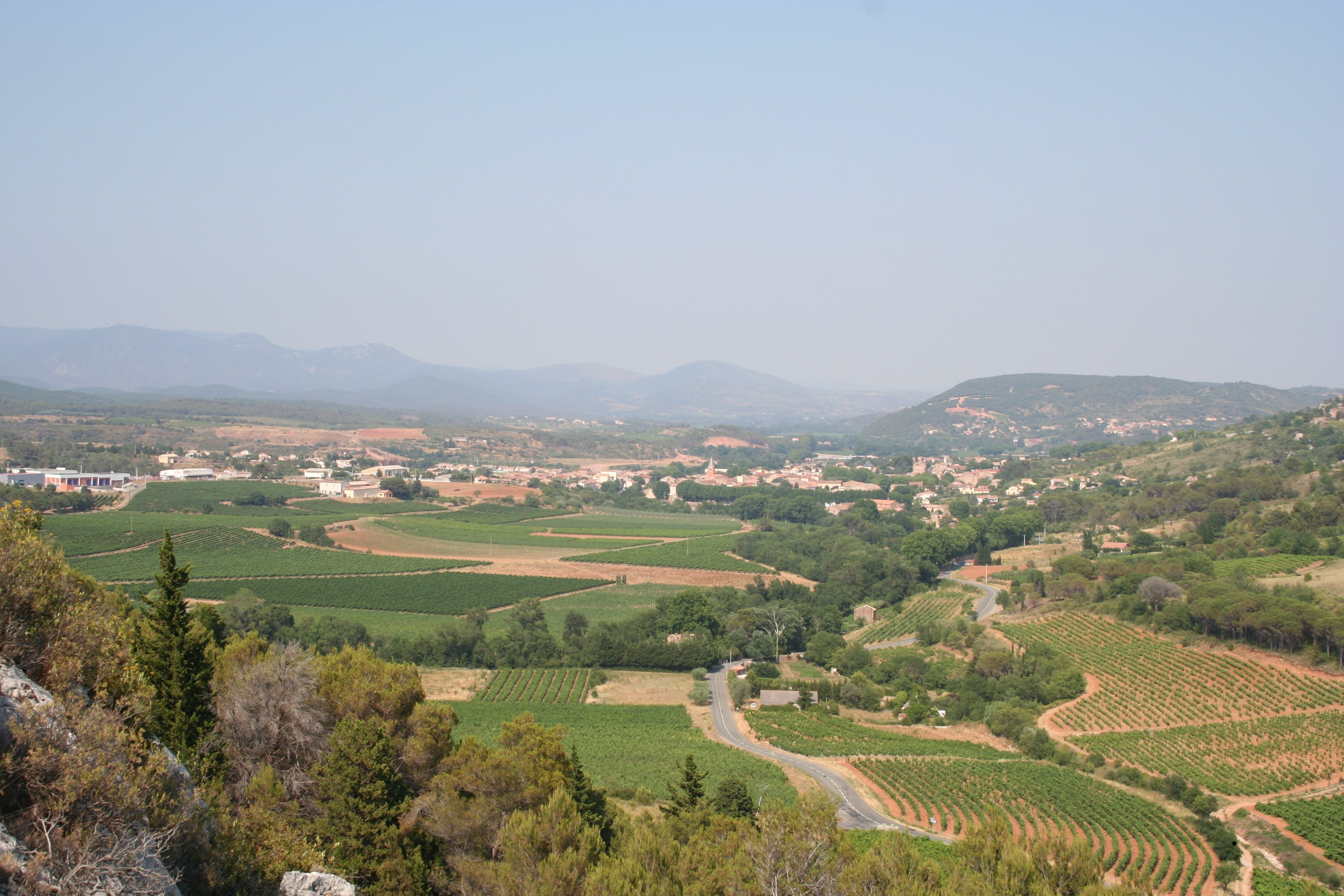
Saint-Chinian

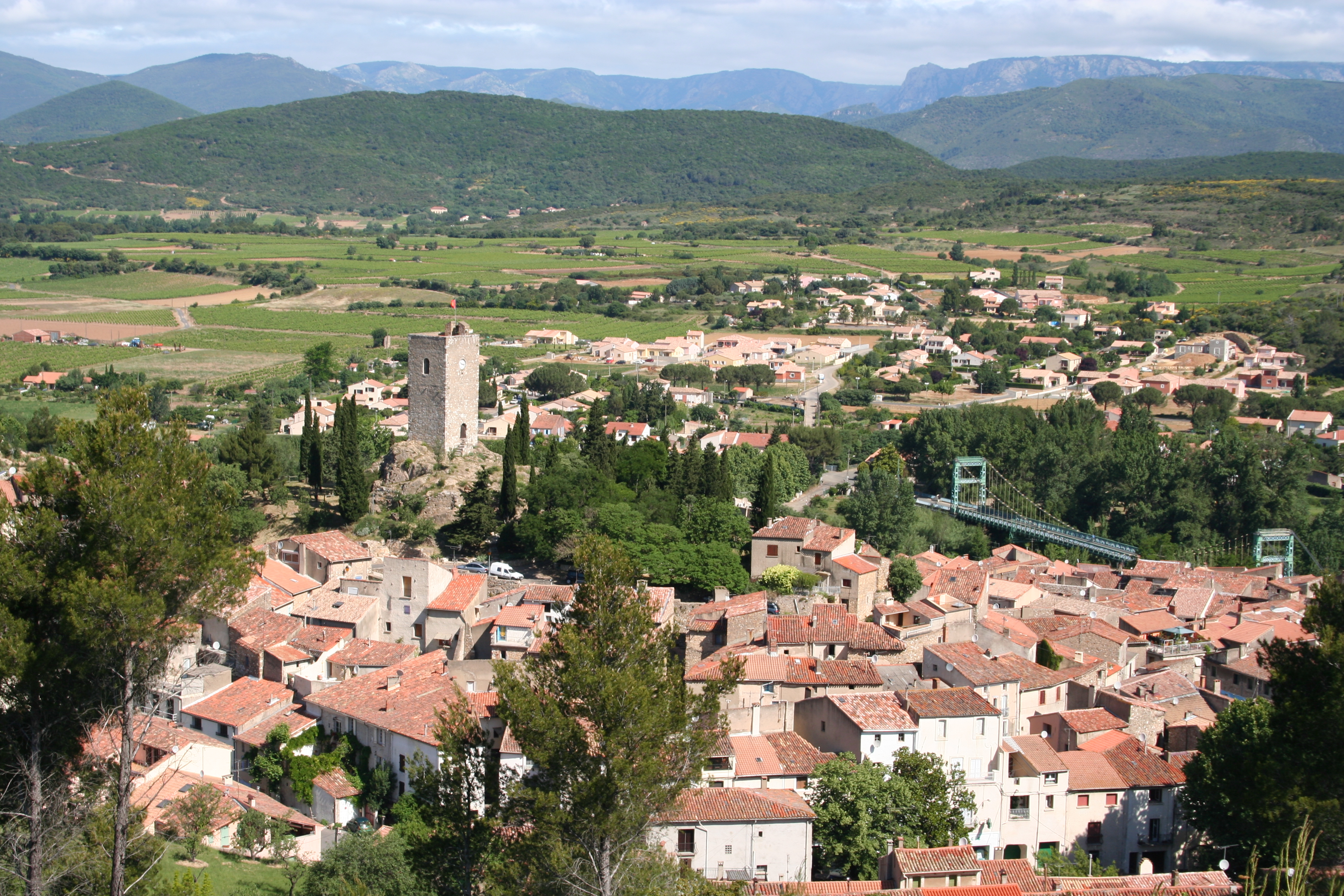
Cessenon-sur-Orb
