= Canton of Florensac =

Coordinates: 43°23′N 3°27′E

Florensac
- Former canton
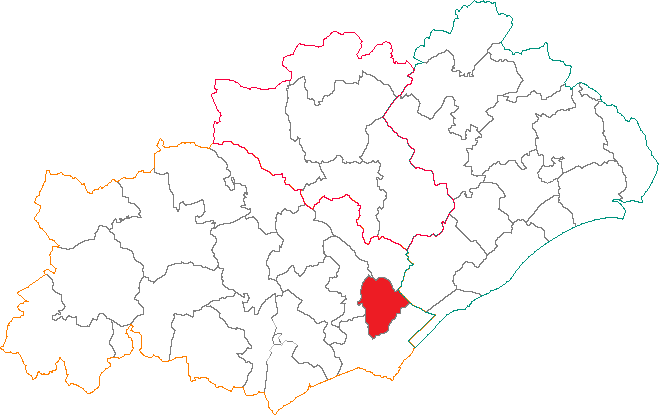
- Country: France
- Region: Occitania
- Department: Hérault
- No. of communes: {{{nbcomm}}}
- Disbanded: 2015
- Area: 78 km^{2} (30 sq mi)
- Population (2012): 9,707
  - Density: 120/km^{2} (320/sq mi)

The Canton of Florensac is a former subdivision of the French department of Hérault, and its subdivision, the Arrondissement of Béziers. It had 9,707 inhabitants (2012). It was disbanded following the French canton reorganisation which came into effect in March 2015. It consisted of 4 communes, which joined the canton of Pézenas in 2015.

== Composition ==
The canton comprised the following communes:

- Castelnau-de-Guers
- Florensac
- Pinet
- Pomérols

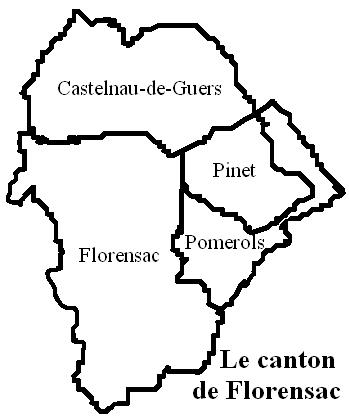
image_map

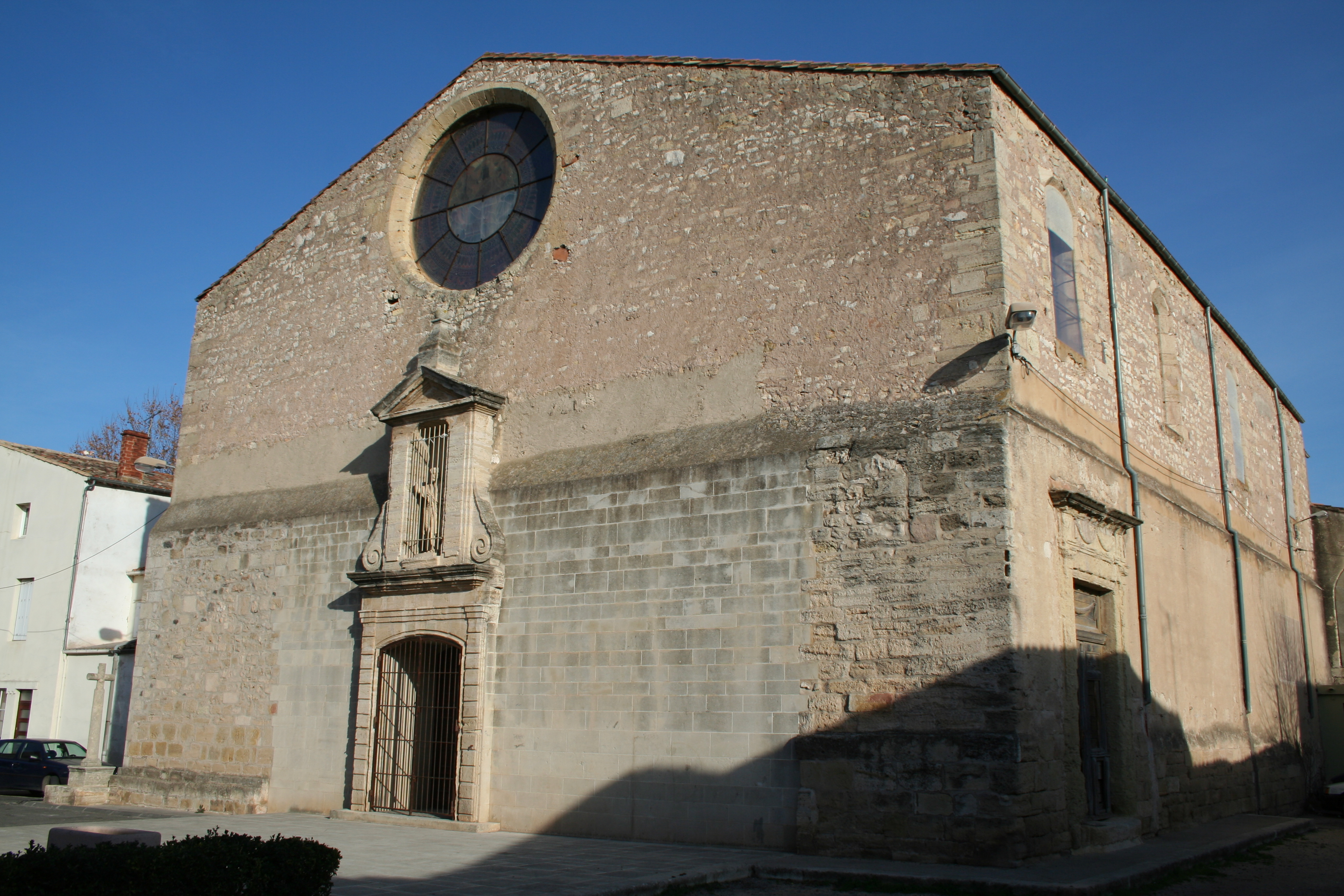
Church of Florensac

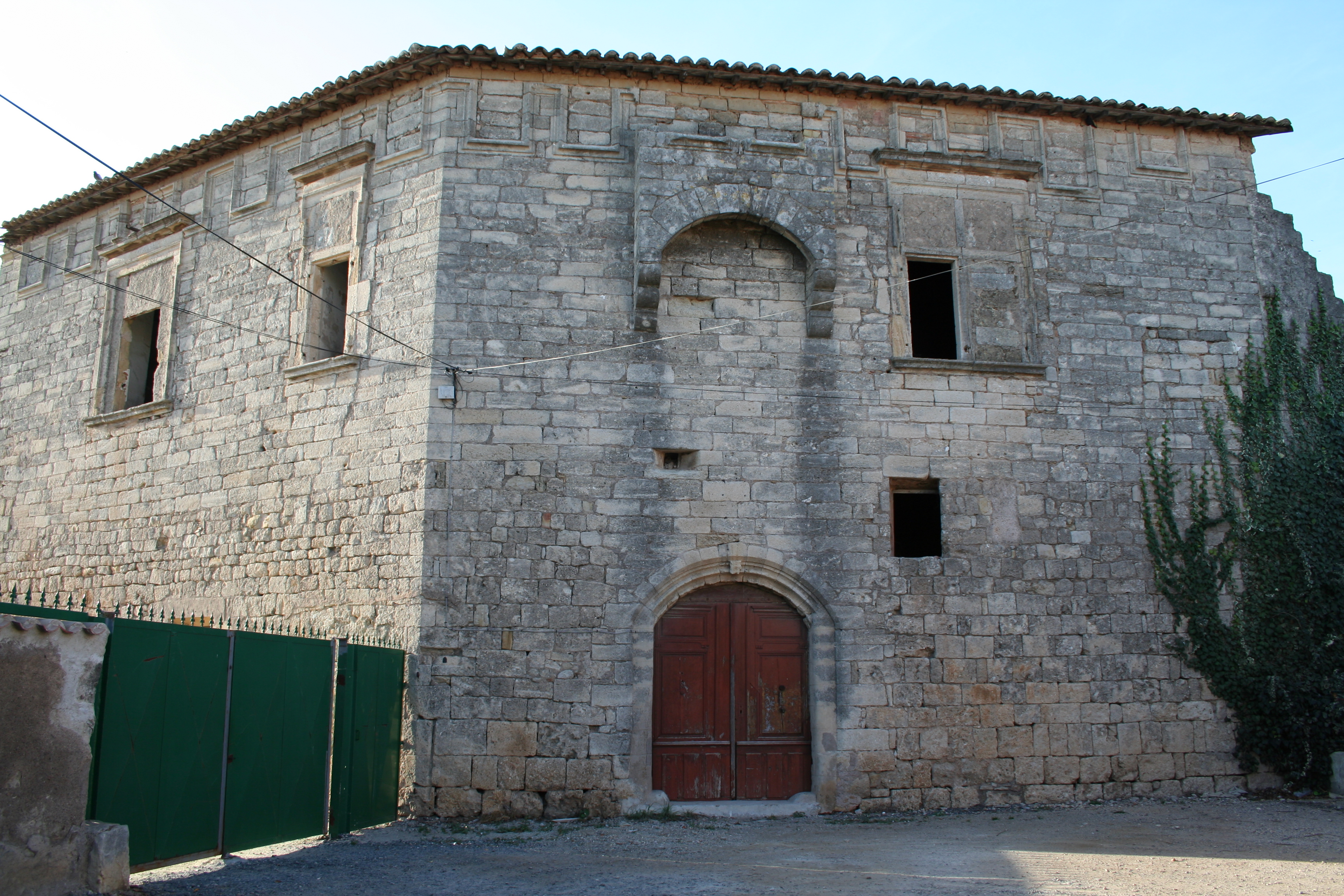
Castle of Castelnau-de-Guers
