= Aigne =

- Commune
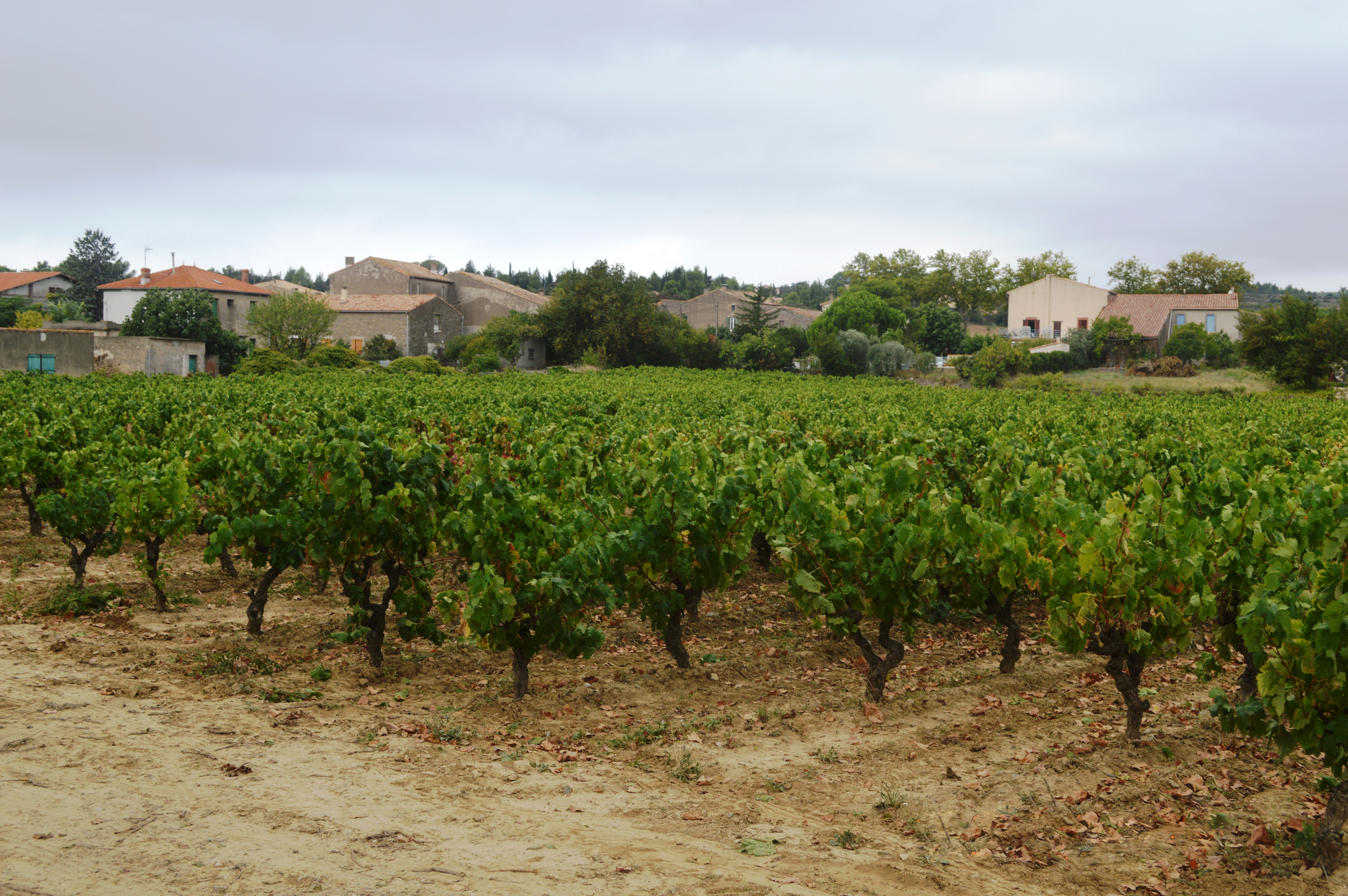
- General view of Aigne

- Coat of arms
- Location of Aigne
- Location within France Location within Occitanie
- Coordinates: 43°20′00″N 2°47′52″E
- Country: France
- Region: Occitania
- Department: Hérault
- Arrondissement: Béziers
- Canton: Saint-Pons-de-Thomières
- Intercommunality: CC du Minervois au Caroux

Government
  - Mayor (2025–2026): Dominique Vidal
- Area^{1}: 10.94 km^{2} (4.22 sq mi)
- Elevation: 150 m (490 ft)
- Highest elevation: 273 m (896 ft)
- Lowest elevation: 79 m (259 ft)
- Population (2023): 301
  - Density: 27.5/km^{2} (71.3/sq mi)
- Time zone: UTC+01:00 (CET)
  - Summer (DST): UTC+02:00 (CEST)
- INSEE/Postal code: 34006 /34210
- ^{1} French Land Register data, which excludes lakes, ponds, glaciers > 1 km^{2} (0.386 sq mi or 247 acres) and river estuaries.

Aigne (French pronunciation: [ɛɲ]; Occitan: Anha) is a commune in the Hérault department in the Occitanie region of southern France.

== Geography ==
Aigne is located some 25 km north-west of Narbonne and 40 km north-east of Carcassonne. The commune can be accessed by the D910 road from Beaufort in the south-west continuing through the commune and the village to Aigues-Vives in the north-east. The D177 minor road also comes from Azillanet in the west to the village then continues north to join the D907 at the northern border of the commune. The south-eastern border of the commune is also the border between the Herault and Aude departments. Most of the commune is undulating farmland with large areas of forest especially towards the west.

Numerous streams rise in the commune and flow towards the south-west. The Ruisseau d'Embusque forms a large part of the south-eastern border.

== History ==
- A Neolithic presence has been found in Mouchas, Mouleyres and Embusco.
- Large Roman Villas have been found at: Saint-Michel, La Prade, Les Mouleyres, Sainte-Leocadie, and Les Clauses
- Slate Tombs have been found at: Saints-Abdon-et-Sennen, La Prade, Sainte-Leocadie, Le Caïrou, Sainte-Luchaire, and Les Mouleyres.

The Treil of Pardailhan were the last noble Aigne family: they were also Barons of Pardailhan and Lords of La Caunette.

=== Heraldry ===
Arms of Aigne	Blazon: Gules, a grapevine eradicated in Vert, leaved and fruited Argent, surmounting a crescent the same; in chief Azure charged with three mullets of Or inverted.

== Administration ==
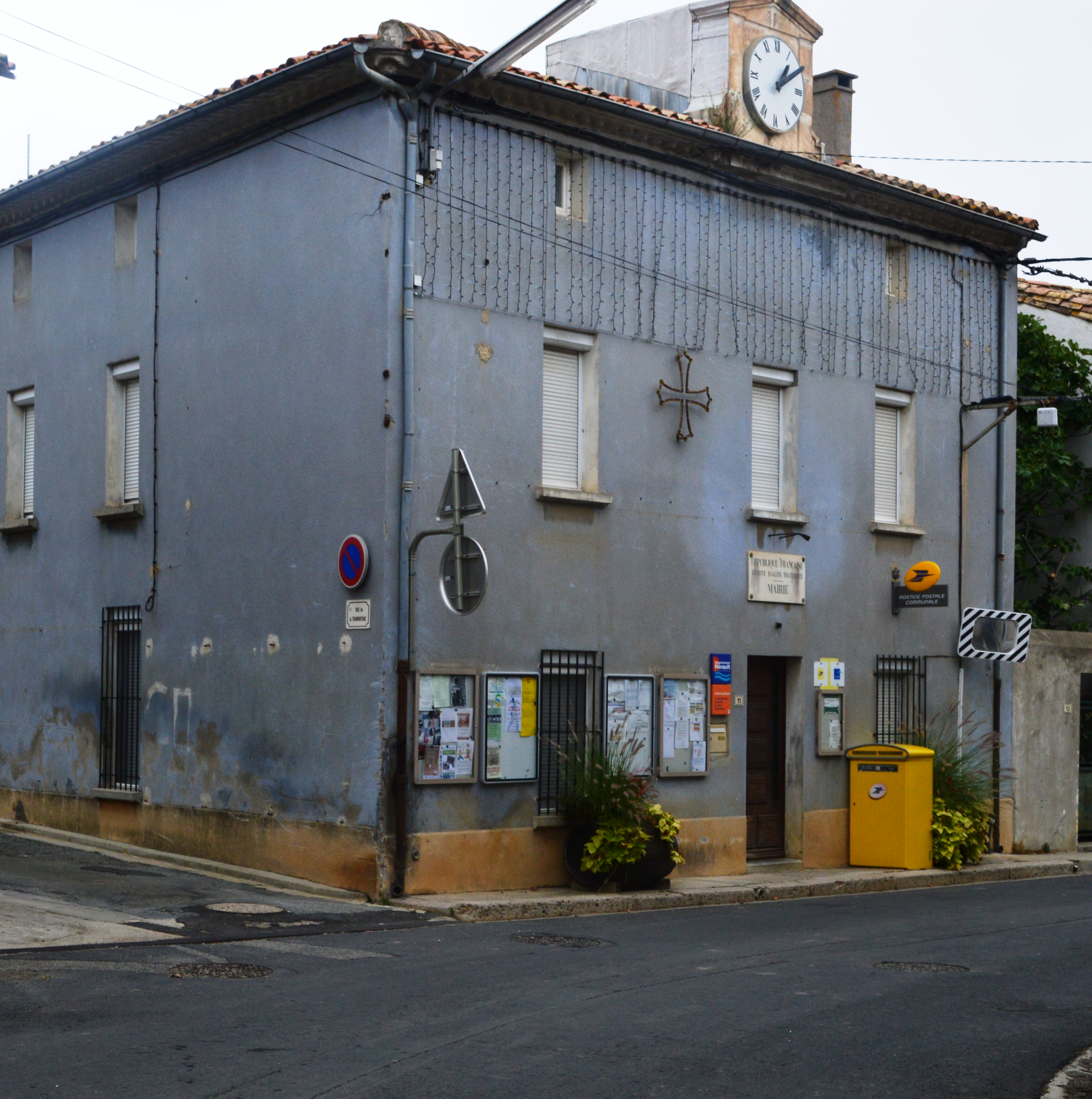
The Town Hall

List of successive mayors of Aigne

From	To	Name
2001	2026	Yves Fraisse

== Population ==
The inhabitants of the commune are known as Aignois or Aignoises in French.

Historical population
Year	Pop.	±% p.a.
1968	321	—
1975	265	−2.70%
1982	237	−1.58%
1990	209	−1.56%
1999	234	+1.26%
2007	258	+1.23%
2012	269	+0.84%
2017	269	+0.00%
2023	301	+1.89%
Source: INSEE

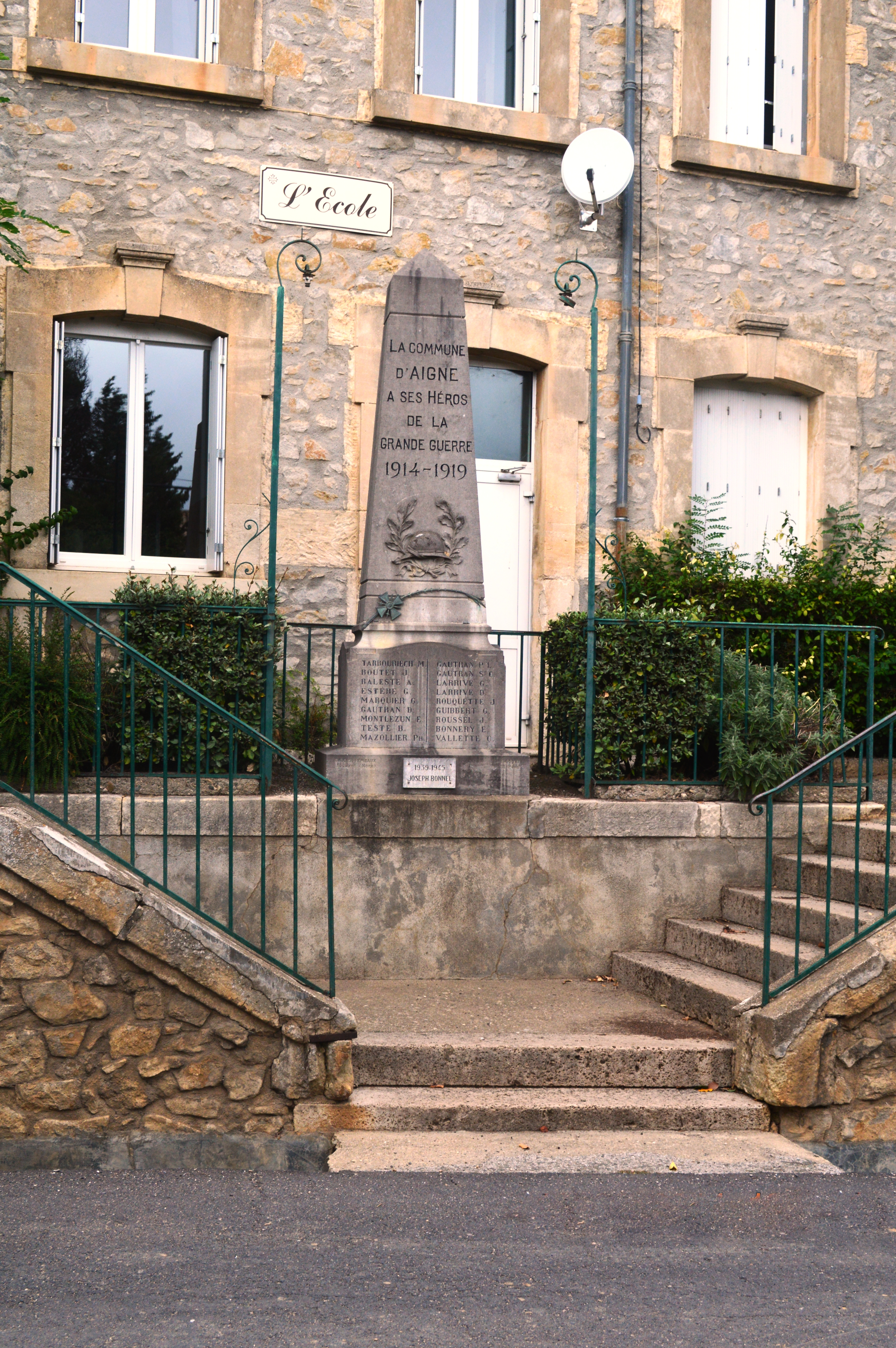
The War Memorial

== Economy ==
Aigne has a cooperative winery located at the entrance of the village. This winery has been absorbed by the cellar of Azillanet and no longer makes wine.

== Culture and heritage ==
=== Civil heritage ===
- L'Escargot (The Snail) is a unique architectural building dating from the 11th century. This is a spiral of houses centred on the church square which is only accessible by a private porch. It was once flanked by a drawbridge and defended by a portcullis. It is likely that this architecture was the result of a strategic choice of defense.

=== Religious heritage ===
The Church contains two items which are registered as historical objects:

- An Altar and Tabernacle (18th century)
- A Bronze bell (1616)

== Tourism ==
There are several sites to visit with a restaurant on the town square and craft workshops.

== See also ==
- Communes of the Hérault department
- Arrondissements of the Hérault department
- Castles in Hérault
