= Agel (disambiguation) =

Agel is a French commune.

Agel may also refer to:

- Mont Agel, mountain on the France-Monaco border
- Jesse Agel (born 1961), American basketball coach
