= Arrondissement of Béziers =

Coordinates: 43°20′34″N 3°12′58″E

Béziers
- Arrondissement
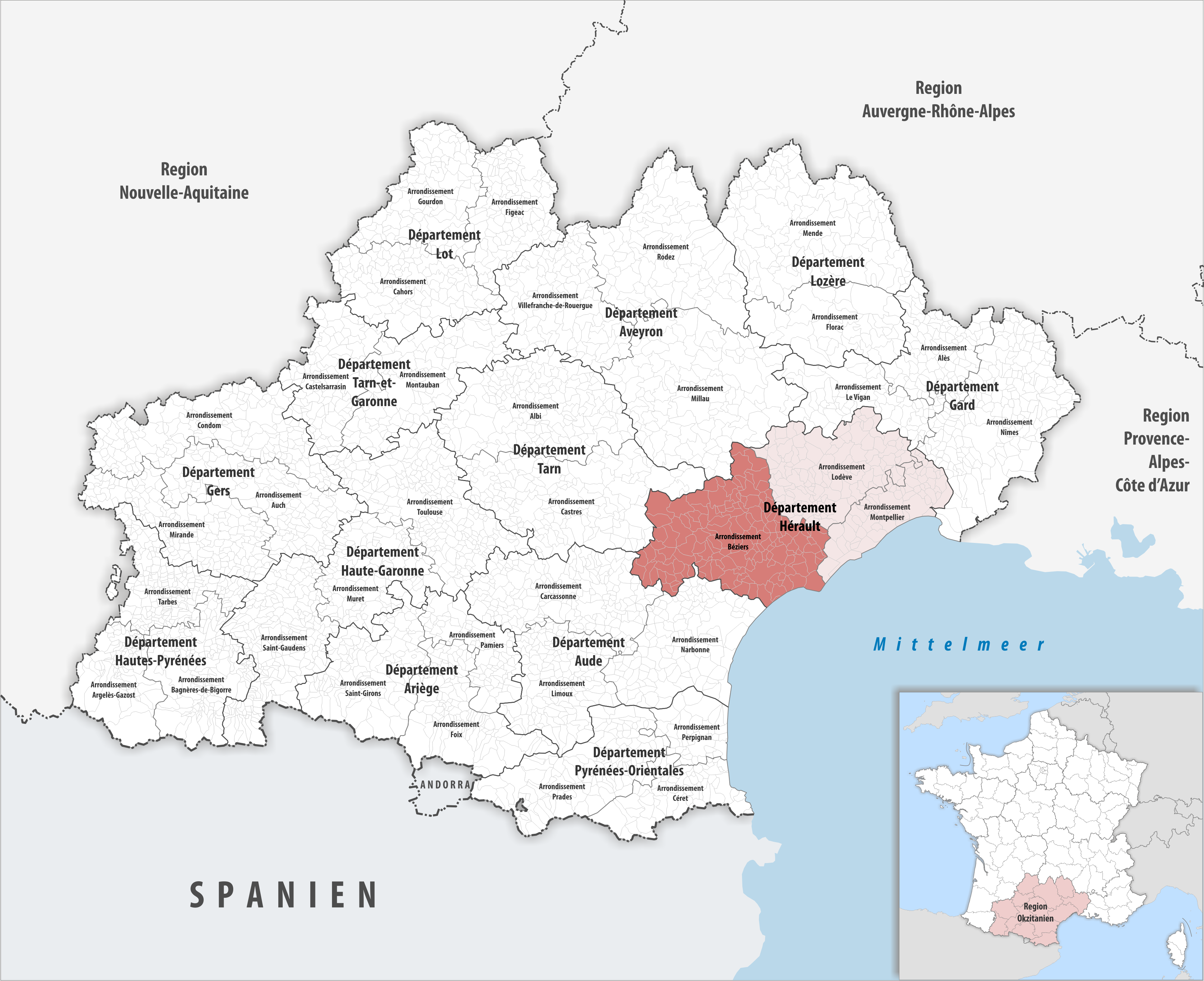
- Location within the region Occitanie
- Country: France
- Region: Occitania
- Department: Hérault
- No. of communes: {{{nbcomm}}}
- Area: 3,091.2 km^{2} (1,193.5 sq mi)
- Population (2023): 329,046
  - Density: 106.45/km^{2} (275.69/sq mi)
- INSEE code: 341

The arrondissement of Béziers is an arrondissement of France in the Hérault department in the Occitanie région. Its INSEE code is 341 and its capital city is Béziers. It has 152 communes. Its population is 321,879 (2021), and its area is 3,091.2 km^{2} (1,193.5 sq mi).

It is the southernmost of the arrondissements of the department. The main cities in the arrondissement, with more than 10,000 inhabitants in 2019, are Béziers (78,308 inhabitants) and Agde (29,600 inhabitants).

== Geography ==
The arrondissement of Béziers is bordered to the north by the Aveyron department and the arrondissement of Lodève, to the northeast by the arrondissement of Montpellier, to the east by the Gulf of Lion (Mediterranean Sea), to the south by the Aude department and to the west by the Tarn department.

== Composition ==
The communes of the arrondissement of Béziers are (with their INSEE codes):

1. Abeilhan (34001)
2. Adissan (34002)
3. Agde (34003)
4. Agel (34004)
5. Aigne (34006)
6. Aigues-Vives (34007)
7. Les Aires (34008)
8. Alignan-du-Vent (34009)
9. Assignan (34015)
10. Aumes (34017)
11. Autignac (34018)
12. Avène (34019)
13. Azillanet (34020)
14. Babeau-Bouldoux (34021)
15. Bassan (34025)
16. Beaufort (34026)
17. Bédarieux (34028)
18. Berlou (34030)
19. Bessan (34031)
20. Béziers (34032)
21. Boisset (34034)
22. Boujan-sur-Libron (34037)
23. Le Bousquet-d'Orb (34038)
24. Brenas (34040)
25. Cabrerolles (34044)
26. Cambon-et-Salvergues (34046)
27. Camplong (34049)
28. Capestang (34052)
29. Carlencas-et-Levas (34053)
30. Cassagnoles (34054)
31. Castanet-le-Haut (34055)
32. Castelnau-de-Guers (34056)
33. La Caunette (34059)
34. Causses-et-Veyran (34061)
35. Caussiniojouls (34062)
36. Caux (34063)
37. Cazedarnes (34065)
38. Cazouls-d'Hérault (34068)
39. Cazouls-lès-Béziers (34069)
40. Cébazan (34070)
41. Ceilhes-et-Rocozels (34071)
42. Cers (34073)
43. Cessenon-sur-Orb (34074)
44. Cesseras (34075)
45. Colombières-sur-Orb (34080)
46. Colombiers (34081)
47. Combes (34083)
48. Corneilhan (34084)
49. Coulobres (34085)
50. Courniou (34086)
51. Creissan (34089)
52. Cruzy (34092)
53. Espondeilhan (34094)
54. Faugères (34096)
55. Félines-Minervois (34097)
56. Ferrals-les-Montagnes (34098)
57. Ferrières-Poussarou (34100)
58. Florensac (34101)
59. Fos (34104)
60. Fouzilhon (34105)
61. Fraisse-sur-Agout (34107)
62. Gabian (34109)
63. Graissessac (34117)
64. Hérépian (34119)
65. Joncels (34121)
66. Lamalou-les-Bains (34126)
67. Laurens (34130)
68. Lespignan (34135)
69. Lézignan-la-Cèbe (34136)
70. Lieuran-lès-Béziers (34139)
71. Lignan-sur-Orb (34140)
72. La Livinière (34141)
73. Lunas-les-Châteaux (34144)
74. Magalas (34147)
75. Maraussan (34148)
76. Margon (34149)
77. Maureilhan (34155)
78. Minerve (34158)
79. Mons (34160)
80. Montady (34161)
81. Montagnac (34162)
82. Montblanc (34166)
83. Montels (34167)
84. Montesquieu (34168)
85. Montouliers (34170)
86. Murviel-lès-Béziers (34178)
87. Neffiès (34181)
88. Nézignan-l'Évêque (34182)
89. Nissan-lez-Enserune (34183)
90. Nizas (34184)
91. Olargues (34187)
92. Olonzac (34189)
93. Oupia (34190)
94. Pailhès (34191)
95. Pardailhan (34193)
96. Pézenas (34199)
97. Pézènes-les-Mines (34200)
98. Pierrerue (34201)
99. Pinet (34203)
100. Poilhes (34206)
101. Pomérols (34207)
102. Portiragnes (34209)
103. Le Poujol-sur-Orb (34211)
104. Pouzolles (34214)
105. Le Pradal (34216)
106. Prades-sur-Vernazobre (34218)
107. Prémian (34219)
108. Puimisson (34223)
109. Puissalicon (34224)
110. Puisserguier (34225)
111. Quarante (34226)
112. Rieussec (34228)
113. Riols (34229)
114. Roquebrun (34232)
115. Roquessels (34234)
116. Rosis (34235)
117. Roujan (34237)
118. Saint-Chinian (34245)
119. Saint-Étienne-d'Albagnan (34250)
120. Saint-Étienne-Estréchoux (34252)
121. Saint-Geniès-de-Fontedit (34258)
122. Saint-Geniès-de-Varensal (34257)
123. Saint-Gervais-sur-Mare (34260)
124. Saint-Jean-de-Minervois (34269)
125. Saint-Julien (34271)
126. Saint-Martin-de-l'Arçon (34273)
127. Saint-Nazaire-de-Ladarez (34279)
128. Saint-Pons-de-Mauchiens (34285)
129. Saint-Pons-de-Thomières (34284)
130. Saint-Thibéry (34289)
131. Saint-Vincent-d'Olargues (34291)
132. La Salvetat-sur-Agout (34293)
133. Sauvian (34298)
134. Sérignan (34299)
135. Servian (34300)
136. Siran (34302)
137. Le Soulié (34305)
138. Taussac-la-Billière (34308)
139. Thézan-lès-Béziers (34310)
140. Tourbes (34311)
141. La Tour-sur-Orb (34312)
142. Vailhan (34319)
143. Valras-Plage (34324)
144. Valros (34325)
145. Vélieux (34326)
146. Vendres (34329)
147. Verreries-de-Moussans (34331)
148. Vias (34332)
149. Vieussan (34334)
150. Villemagne-l'Argentière (34335)
151. Villeneuve-lès-Béziers (34336)
152. Villespassans (34339)

== History ==
The arrondissement of Béziers was created in 1800. At the January 2017 reorganisation of the arrondissements of Hérault, it gained seven communes from the arrondissement of Lodève, and it lost five communes to the arrondissement of Lodève and one commune to the arrondissement of Montpellier.

As a result of the reorganisation of the cantons of France which came into effect in 2015, the borders of the cantons are no longer related to the borders of the arrondissements. The cantons of the arrondissement of Béziers were, as of January 2015:

1. Agde
2. Bédarieux
3. Béziers-1
4. Béziers-2
5. Béziers-3
6. Béziers-4
7. Capestang
8. Florensac
9. Montagnac
10. Murviel-lès-Béziers
11. Olargues
12. Olonzac
13. Pézenas
14. Roujan
15. Saint-Chinian
16. Saint-Gervais-sur-Mare
17. Saint-Pons-de-Thomières
18. La Salvetat-sur-Agout
19. Servian
