= Pinet, Hérault =

Pinet
- Commune
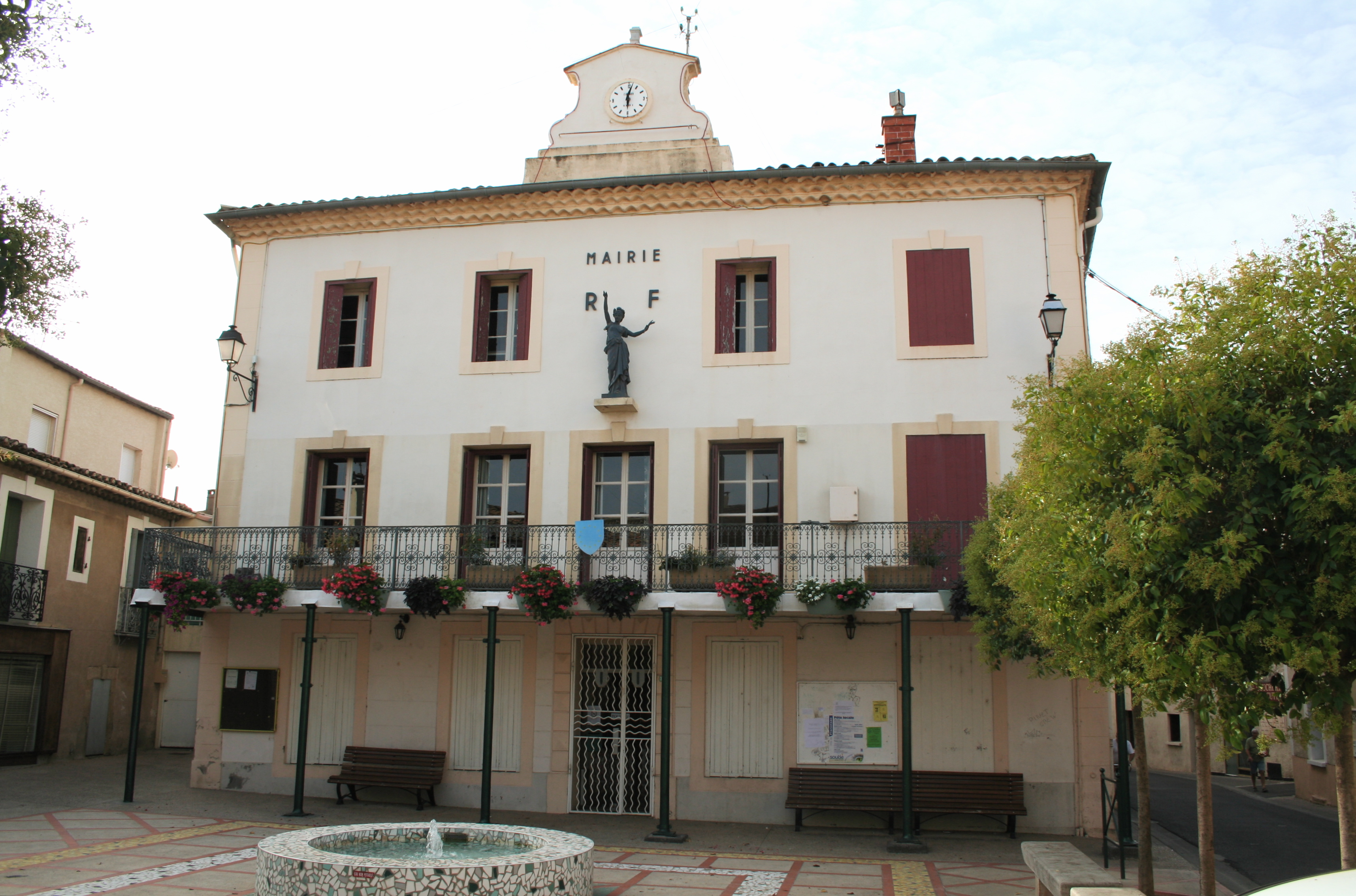
- Town hall

- Coat of arms
- Location of Pinet
- Location within France Location within Occitanie
- Coordinates: 43°24′20″N 3°30′36″E
- Country: France
- Region: Occitania
- Department: Hérault
- Arrondissement: Béziers
- Canton: Pézenas
- Intercommunality: CA Hérault Méditerranée

Government
  - Mayor (2021–2026): Nicolas Isern
- Area^{1}: 8.83 km^{2} (3.41 sq mi)
- Elevation: 13 m (43 ft)
- Highest elevation: 68 m (223 ft)
- Lowest elevation: 5 m (16 ft)
- Population (2023): 2,049
  - Density: 232/km^{2} (601/sq mi)
- Time zone: UTC+01:00 (CET)
  - Summer (DST): UTC+02:00 (CEST)
- INSEE/Postal code: 34203 /34850
- ^{1} French Land Register data, which excludes lakes, ponds, glaciers > 1 km^{2} (0.386 sq mi or 247 acres) and river estuaries.

Pinet (French pronunciation: [pinɛ]) is a commune in the Hérault department in the Occitanie region in southern France.

== Population ==
Historical population
Year	Pop.	±% p.a.
1968	814	—
1975	805	−0.16%
1982	827	+0.39%
1990	904	+1.12%
1999	990	+1.01%
2007	1,247	+2.93%
2012	1,418	+2.60%
2017	1,745	+4.24%
2023	2,049	+2.71%
Source: INSEE

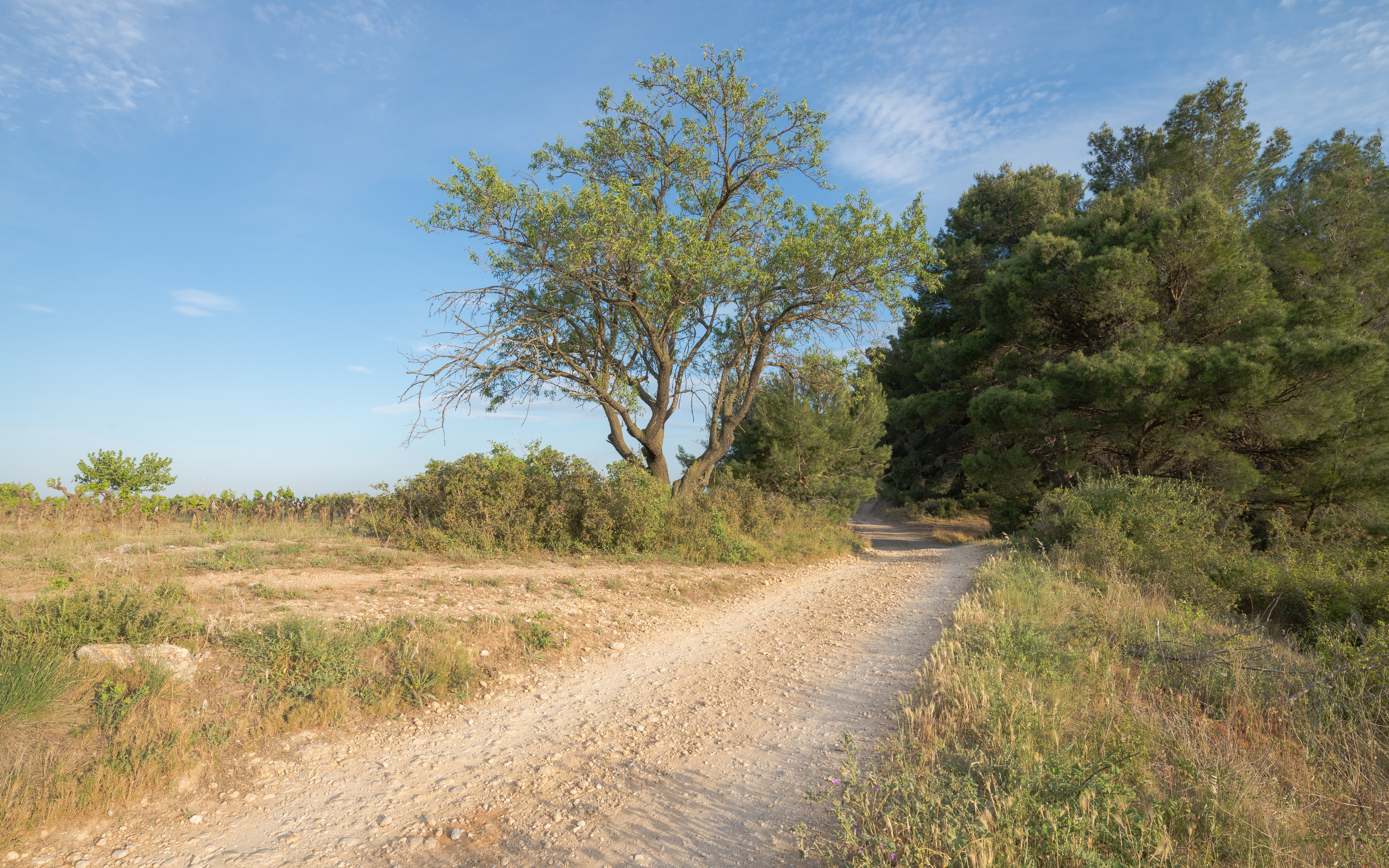
A trail in Pinet.

== Economy ==
AOP Picpoul de Pinet is the only white wine appellation in the Languedoc. Vineyards are situated on the low hills surrounding the Etang de Thau, and include six different villages. Annual production is around 8,000,000 litres (1,800,000 imp gal). The wine is named Picpoul de Pinet, but the grape variety is Piquepoul blanc. Cultivation covers about 1,400 hectares (3,500 acres), on mostly limestone-based soils.

== See also ==
- Communes of the Hérault department
