= Villespassans =

- Commune
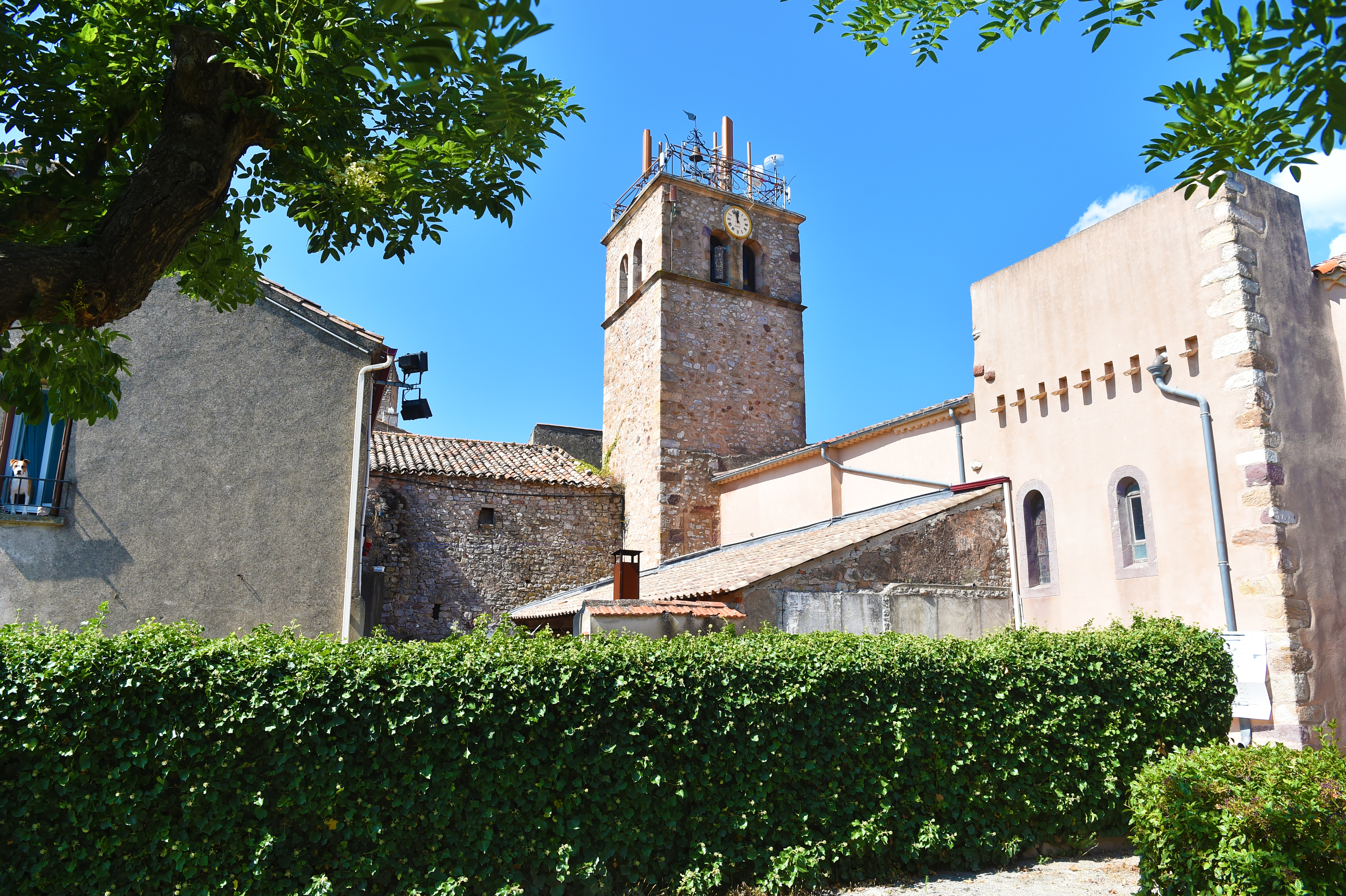

- Coat of arms
- Location of Villespassans
- Location within France Location within Occitanie
- Coordinates: 43°22′54″N 2°54′59″E
- Country: France
- Region: Occitania
- Department: Hérault
- Arrondissement: Béziers
- Canton: Saint-Pons-de-Thomières

Government
  - Mayor (2020–2026): Jean-Christophe Petit
- Area^{1}: 14.07 km^{2} (5.43 sq mi)
- Elevation: 249 m (817 ft)
- Highest elevation: 321 m (1,053 ft)
- Lowest elevation: 138 m (453 ft)
- Population (2023): 185
  - Density: 13.1/km^{2} (34.1/sq mi)
- Time zone: UTC+01:00 (CET)
  - Summer (DST): UTC+02:00 (CEST)
- INSEE/Postal code: 34339 /34360
- ^{1} French Land Register data, which excludes lakes, ponds, glaciers > 1 km^{2} (0.386 sq mi or 247 acres) and river estuaries.

Villespassans is a commune in the Hérault department in the Occitanie region in southern France.

== Geography ==
=== Climate ===
Villespassans has a mediterranean climate (Köppen climate classification Csa). The average annual temperature in Villespassans is 14.4 °C (57.9 °F). The average annual rainfall is 729.2 mm (28.71 in) with October as the wettest month. The temperatures are highest on average in July, at around 23.3 °C (73.9 °F), and lowest in January, at around 6.9 °C (44.4 °F). The highest temperature ever recorded in Villespassans was 41.7 °C (107.1 °F) on 6 August 2003; the coldest temperature ever recorded was −14.6 °C (5.7 °F) on 9 January 1985.

Climate data for Villespassans (1981–2010 averages, extremes 1980−2019)
Month	Jan	Feb	Mar	Apr	May	Jun	Jul	Aug	Sep	Oct	Nov	Dec	Year
Record high °C (°F)	21.1 (70.0)	23.9 (75.0)	28.0 (82.4)	31.2 (88.2)	36.0 (96.8)	41.0 (105.8)	38.6 (101.5)	41.7 (107.1)	36.5 (97.7)	32.6 (90.7)	24.7 (76.5)	21.8 (71.2)	41.7 (107.1)
Mean daily maximum °C (°F)	10.6 (51.1)	11.6 (52.9)	14.7 (58.5)	17.2 (63.0)	21.2 (70.2)	25.9 (78.6)	29.2 (84.6)	28.7 (83.7)	24.5 (76.1)	19.4 (66.9)	14.1 (57.4)	11.2 (52.2)	19.1 (66.4)
Daily mean °C (°F)	6.9 (44.4)	7.5 (45.5)	10.1 (50.2)	12.4 (54.3)	16.3 (61.3)	20.4 (68.7)	23.3 (73.9)	23.0 (73.4)	19.4 (66.9)	15.4 (59.7)	10.4 (50.7)	7.6 (45.7)	14.4 (57.9)
Mean daily minimum °C (°F)	3.2 (37.8)	3.5 (38.3)	5.5 (41.9)	7.6 (45.7)	11.3 (52.3)	14.9 (58.8)	17.4 (63.3)	17.2 (63.0)	14.3 (57.7)	11.3 (52.3)	6.7 (44.1)	3.9 (39.0)	9.8 (49.6)
Record low °C (°F)	−13.5 (7.7)	−9.3 (15.3)	−8.5 (16.7)	−0.8 (30.6)	1.2 (34.2)	6.5 (43.7)	9.5 (49.1)	8.6 (47.5)	6.1 (43.0)	−1.3 (29.7)	−6.0 (21.2)	−8.1 (17.4)	−13.5 (7.7)
Average precipitation mm (inches)	69.6 (2.74)	79.1 (3.11)	49.6 (1.95)	61.0 (2.40)	54.4 (2.14)	35.4 (1.39)	19.2 (0.76)	46.1 (1.81)	56.6 (2.23)	107.9 (4.25)	77.7 (3.06)	72.6 (2.86)	729.2 (28.71)
Average precipitation days (≥ 1.0 mm)	6.7	5.7	6.0	6.7	6.0	3.9	3.1	4.1	4.6	6.7	6.0	6.6	66.3
Source: Meteociel

== Population ==
Historical population
Year	Pop.	±% p.a.
1968	156	—
1975	136	−1.94%
1982	132	−0.43%
1990	124	−0.78%
1999	126	+0.18%
2007	138	+1.14%
2012	150	+1.68%
2017	171	+2.66%
2023	185	+1.32%
Source: INSEE

== See also ==
- Communes of the Hérault department
