= Castelnau-de-Guers =

- Commune
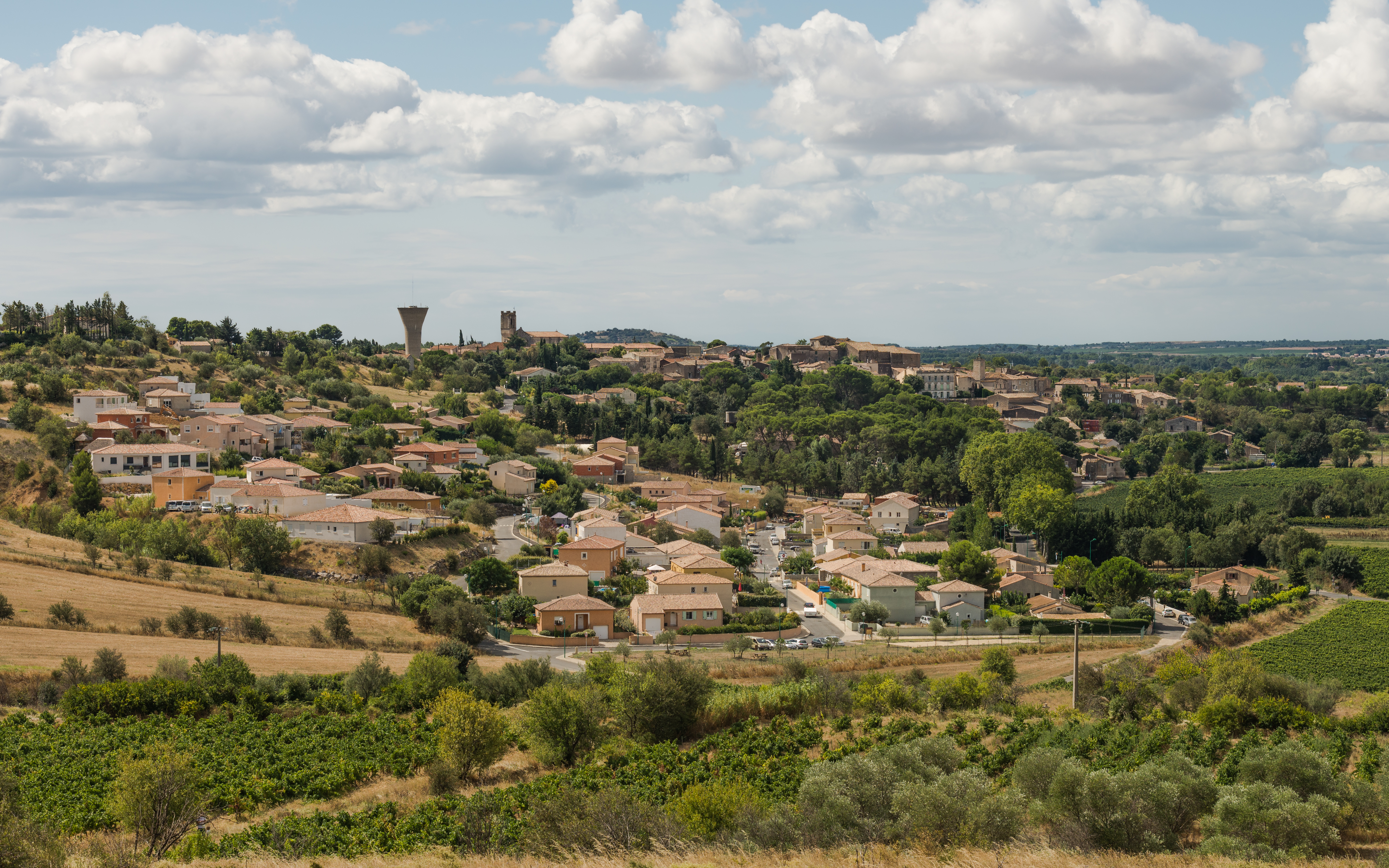
- General view from Northeast

- Coat of arms
- Location of Castelnau-de-Guers
- Location within France Location within Occitanie
- Coordinates: 43°26′09″N 3°26′21″E
- Country: France
- Region: Occitania
- Department: Hérault
- Arrondissement: Béziers
- Canton: Pézenas
- Intercommunality: CA Hérault Méditerranée

Government
  - Mayor (2020–2026): Didier Michel
- Area^{1}: 22.51 km^{2} (8.69 sq mi)
- Highest elevation: 105 m (344 ft)
- Lowest elevation: 1 m (3.3 ft)
- Population (2023): 1,208
  - Density: 53.67/km^{2} (139.0/sq mi)
- Time zone: UTC+01:00 (CET)
  - Summer (DST): UTC+02:00 (CEST)
- INSEE/Postal code: 34056 /34120
- ^{1} French Land Register data, which excludes lakes, ponds, glaciers > 1 km^{2} (0.386 sq mi or 247 acres) and river estuaries.

Castelnau-de-Guers (Languedocien: Castèlnòu de Guèrs) is a commune in the Hérault department in southern France. It is the birthplace of historian Michel Christol.

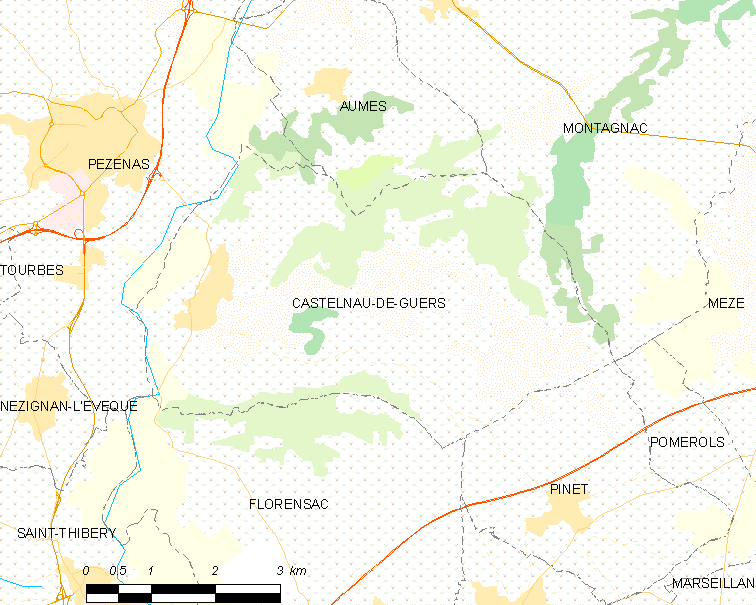
Map

== Population ==
Historical population
Year	Pop.	±% p.a.
1968	837	—
1975	827	−0.17%
1982	886	+0.99%
1990	876	−0.14%
1999	889	+0.16%
2007	1,055	+2.16%
2012	1,134	+1.45%
2017	1,197	+1.09%
2023	1,208	+0.15%
Source: INSEE

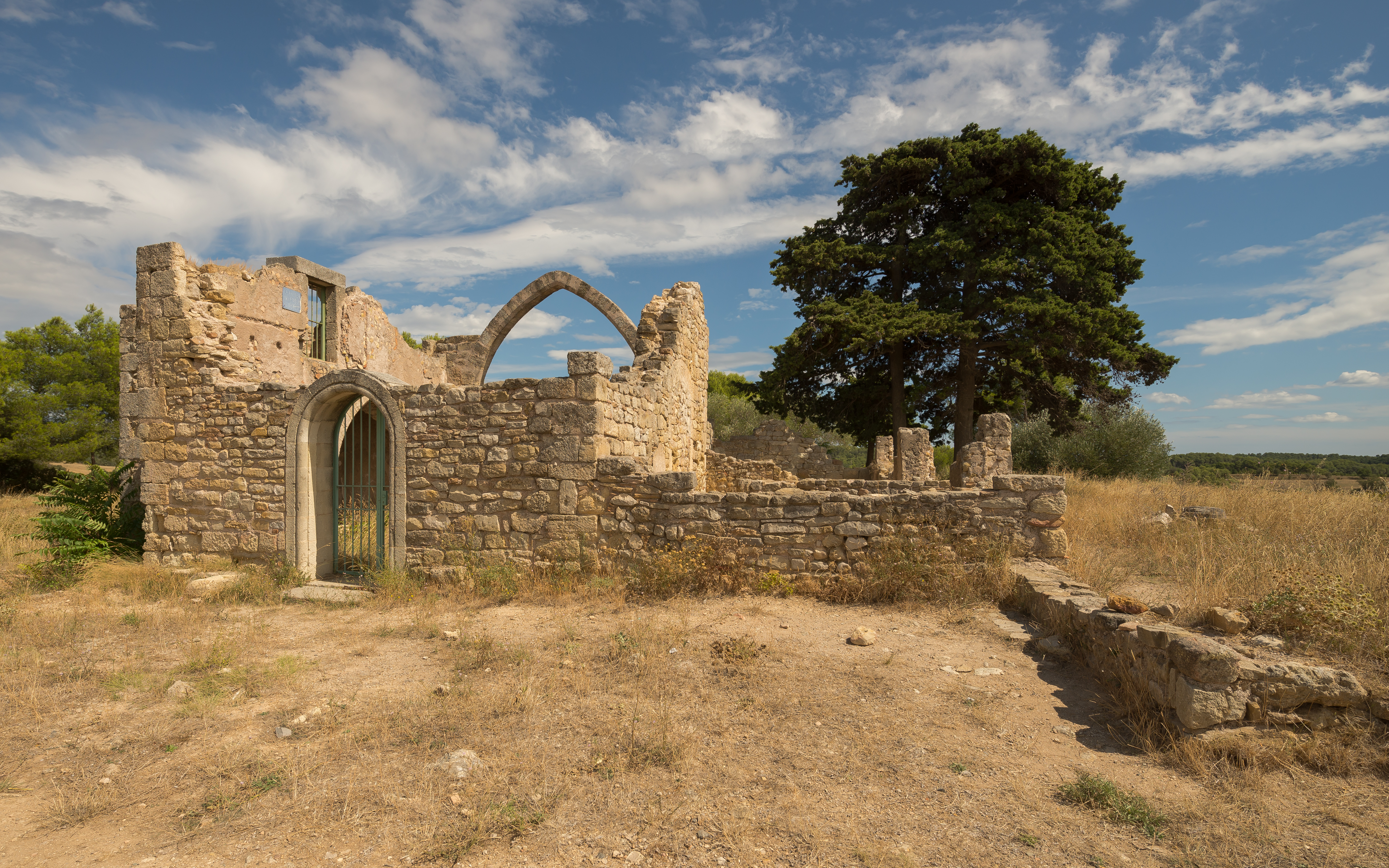
Ruins of the Hermitage Saint-Antoine

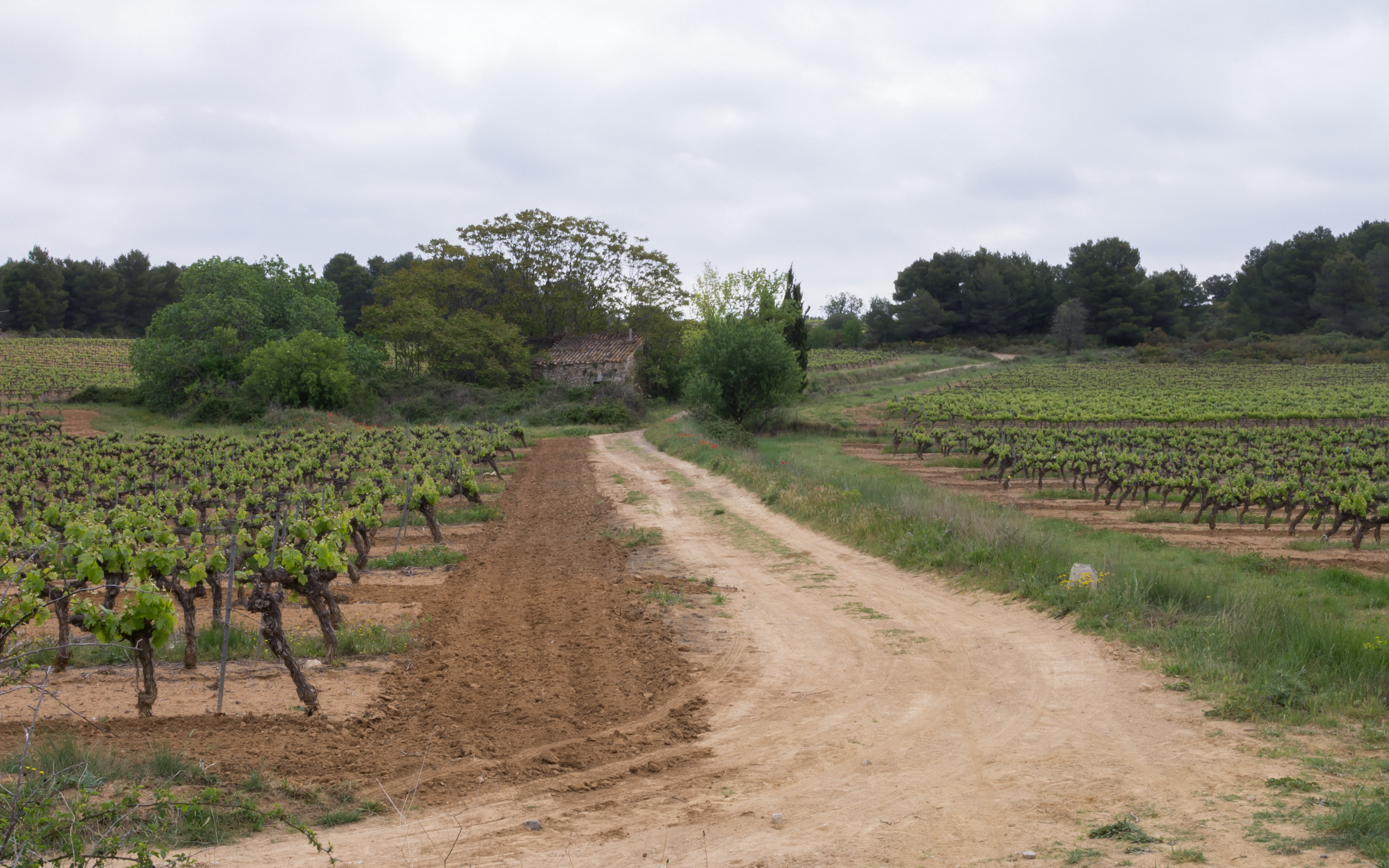
Vineyard and Mas du Sol

== See also ==
- Communes of the Hérault department
