= Azillanet =

- Commune
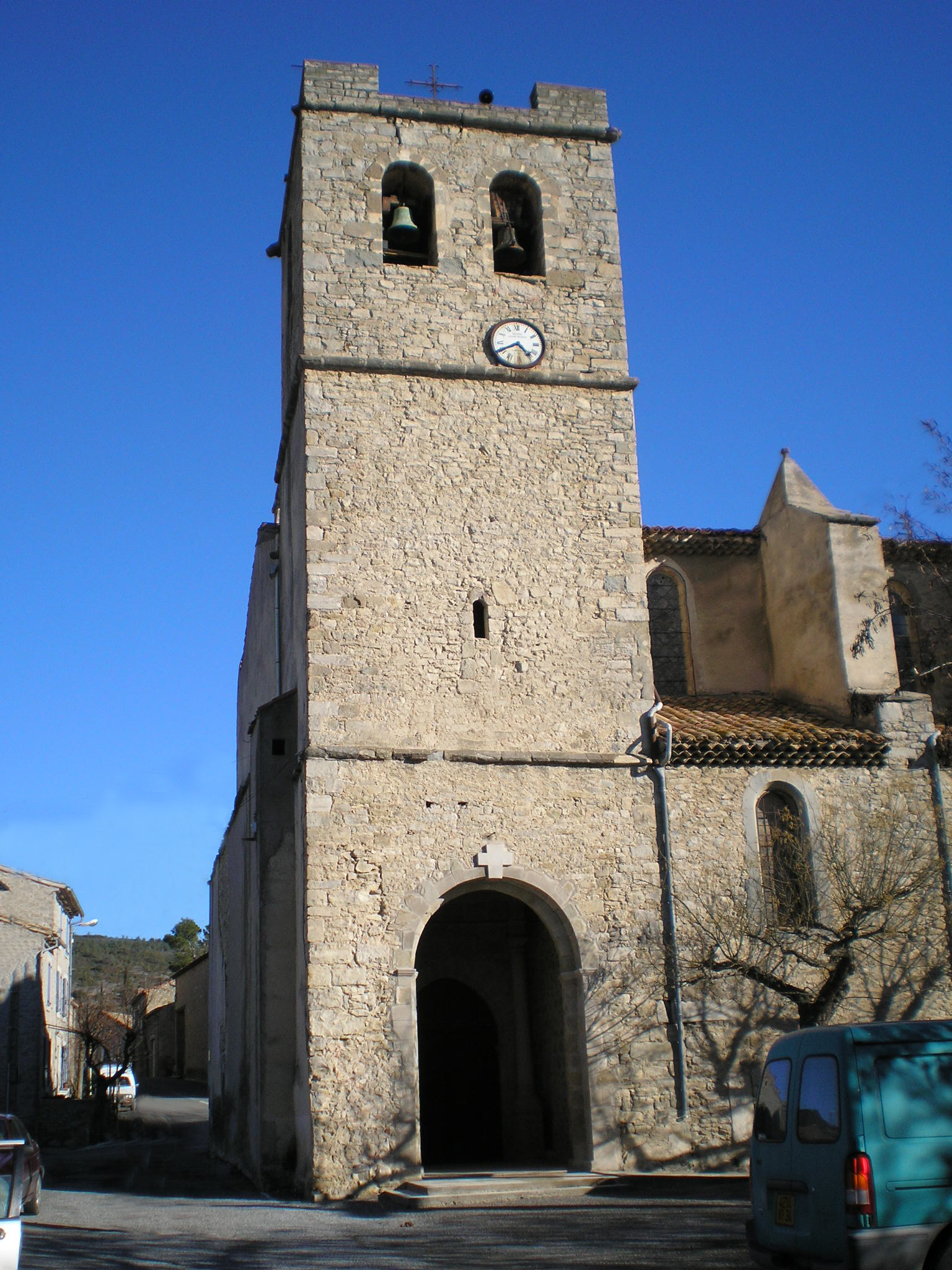
- Saint-Laurent Church

- Coat of arms
- Location of Azillanet
- Location within France Location within Occitanie
- Coordinates: 43°19′30″N 2°44′18″E
- Country: France
- Region: Occitania
- Department: Hérault
- Arrondissement: Béziers
- Canton: Saint-Pons-de-Thomières
- Intercommunality: Minervois au Caroux

Government
  - Mayor (2020–2026): Alexandre Dye
- Area^{1}: 14.4 km^{2} (5.6 sq mi)
- Elevation: 100 m (330 ft)
- Highest elevation: 279 m (915 ft)
- Lowest elevation: 62 m (203 ft)
- Population (2023): 357
  - Density: 24.8/km^{2} (64.2/sq mi)
- Time zone: UTC+01:00 (CET)
  - Summer (DST): UTC+02:00 (CEST)
- INSEE/Postal code: 34020 /34210
- ^{1} French Land Register data, which excludes lakes, ponds, glaciers > 1 km^{2} (0.386 sq mi or 247 acres) and river estuaries.

Azillanet (French pronunciation: [azijanɛ]; Occitan: Asilhanet) is a commune in the Hérault department in southern France.

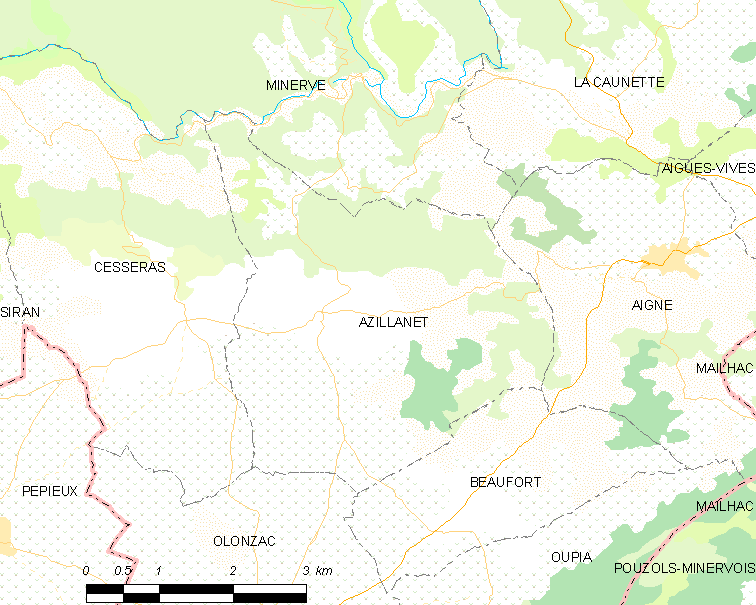
Map

== Population ==
Historical population
Year	Pop.	±% p.a.
1968	468	—
1975	384	−2.79%
1982	371	−0.49%
1990	331	−1.42%
1999	370	+1.25%
2007	398	+0.92%
2012	410	+0.60%
2017	365	−2.30%
2023	357	−0.37%
Source: INSEE

== See also ==
- Communes of the Hérault department
