= Saint-Julien, Hérault =

Saint-Julien-d'Olargues
- Commune
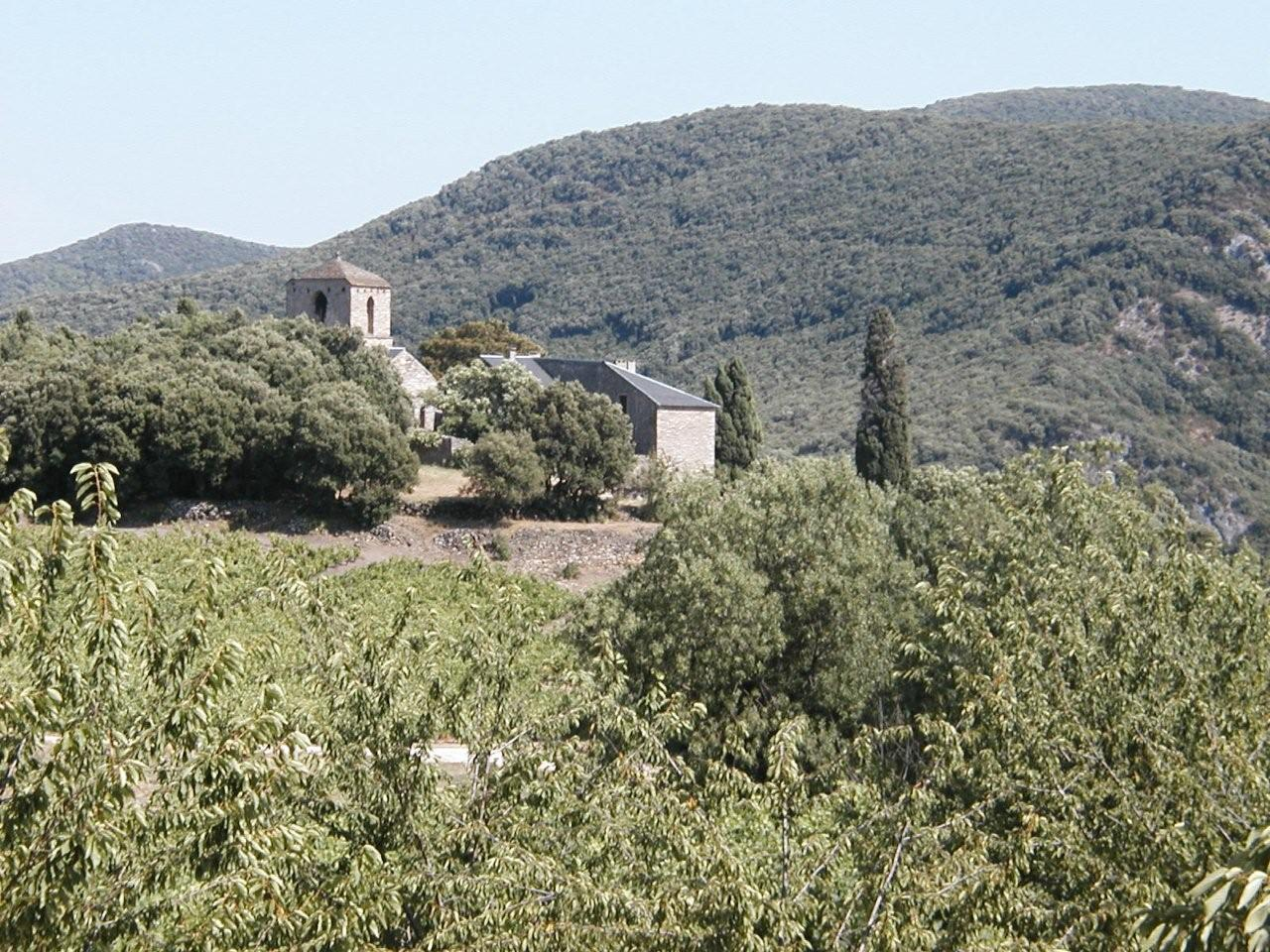
- Priory

- Coat of arms
- Location of Saint-Julien-d'Olargues
- Location within France Location within Occitanie
- Coordinates: 43°34′12″N 2°55′37″E
- Country: France
- Region: Occitania
- Department: Hérault
- Arrondissement: Béziers
- Canton: Saint-Pons-de-Thomières

Government
  - Mayor (2020–2026): Robert Azaïs
- Area^{1}: 19.25 km^{2} (7.43 sq mi)
- Elevation: 250 m (820 ft)
- Highest elevation: 1,090 m (3,580 ft)
- Lowest elevation: 148 m (486 ft)
- Population (2023): 228
  - Density: 11.8/km^{2} (30.7/sq mi)
- Time zone: UTC+01:00 (CET)
  - Summer (DST): UTC+02:00 (CEST)
- INSEE/Postal code: 34271 /34390
- ^{1} French Land Register data, which excludes lakes, ponds, glaciers > 1 km^{2} (0.386 sq mi or 247 acres) and river estuaries.

Saint-Julien (French pronunciation: [sɛ̃ ʒyljɛ̃]; Languedocien: Sant Julian), also known as Saint-Julien-d'Olargues, is a commune in the Hérault department in the Occitanie region in southern France.

== Population ==
Historical population
Year	Pop.	±% p.a.
1968	162	—
1975	137	−2.37%
1982	151	+1.40%
1990	192	+3.05%
1999	191	−0.06%
2007	201	+0.64%
2012	212	+1.07%
2017	220	+0.74%
2023	228	+0.60%
Source: INSEE

== See also ==
- Communes of the Hérault department
