= Saint-Étienne-d'Albagnan =

- Commune
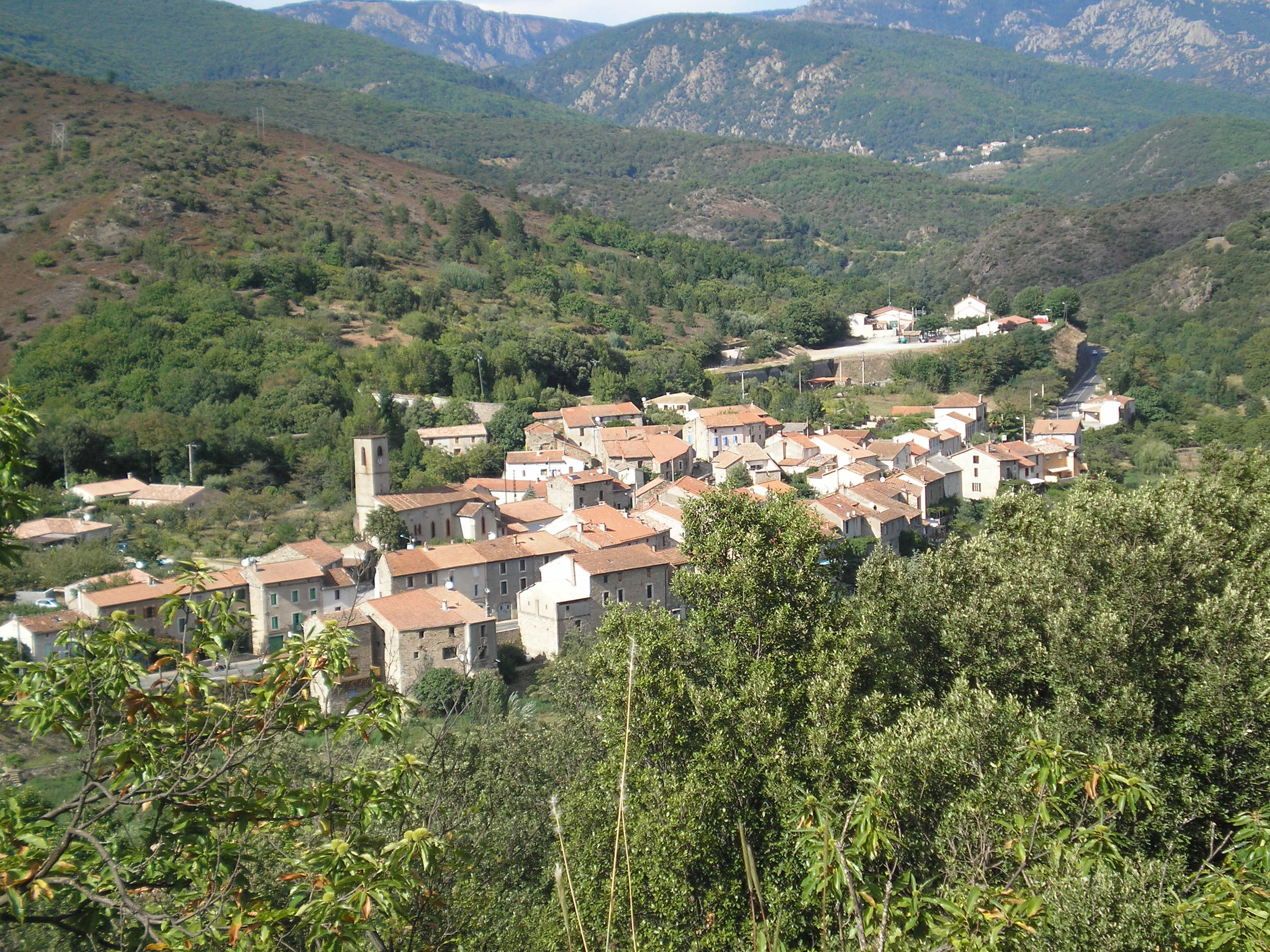
- A general view of Saint-Étienne-d'Albagnan

- Coat of arms
- Location of Saint-Étienne-d'Albagnan
- Location within France Location within Occitanie
- Coordinates: 43°31′58″N 2°51′25″E
- Country: France
- Region: Occitania
- Department: Hérault
- Arrondissement: Béziers
- Canton: Saint-Pons-de-Thomières

Government
  - Mayor (2020–2026): Franck Lignon
- Area^{1}: 22.7 km^{2} (8.8 sq mi)
- Elevation: 230 m (750 ft)
- Highest elevation: 1,102 m (3,615 ft)
- Lowest elevation: 207 m (679 ft)
- Population (2023): 302
  - Density: 13.3/km^{2} (34.5/sq mi)
- Time zone: UTC+01:00 (CET)
  - Summer (DST): UTC+02:00 (CEST)
- INSEE/Postal code: 34250 /34390
- ^{1} French Land Register data, which excludes lakes, ponds, glaciers > 1 km^{2} (0.386 sq mi or 247 acres) and river estuaries.

Saint-Étienne-d'Albagnan (French pronunciation: [sɛ̃.t‿etjɛn dalbaɲɑ̃]; Languedocien: Lo Mas de la Glèisa) is a commune in the Hérault department in the Occitanie region in southern France.

== Population ==
Historical population
Year	Pop.	±% p.a.
1968	319	—
1975	256	−3.09%
1982	218	−2.27%
1990	253	+1.88%
1999	271	+0.77%
2007	295	+1.07%
2012	323	+1.83%
2017	306	−1.08%
2023	302	−0.22%
Source: INSEE

== See also ==
- Communes of the Hérault department
