= Beaufort, Hérault =

Beaufort
- Commune
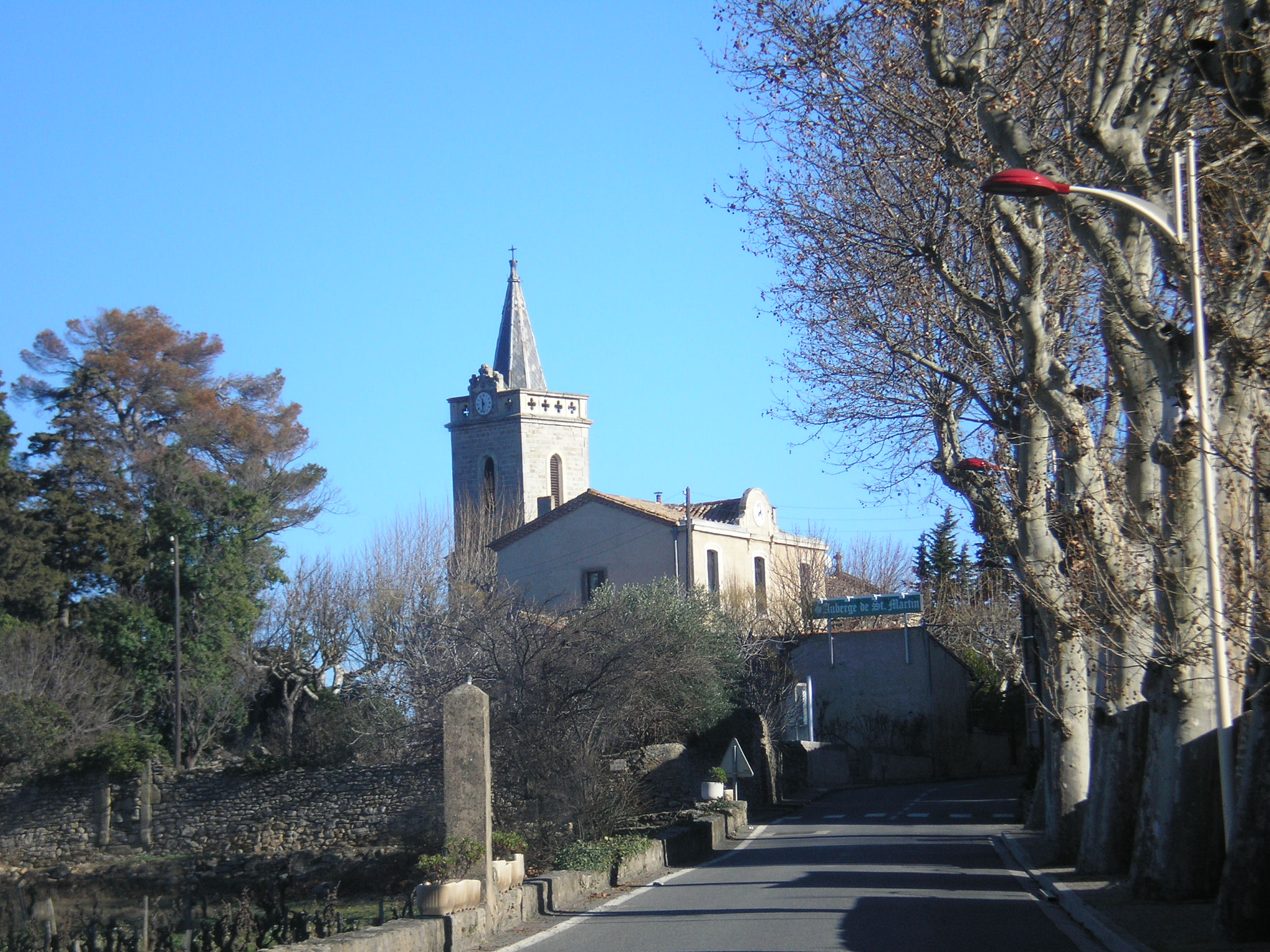
- The church of Saint-Martin

- Coat of arms
- Location of Beaufort
- Location within France Location within Occitanie
- Coordinates: 43°17′57″N 2°45′32″E
- Country: France
- Region: Occitania
- Department: Hérault
- Arrondissement: Béziers
- Canton: Saint-Pons-de-Thomières
- Intercommunality: CC du Minervois au Caroux

Government
  - Mayor (2022–2026): Françoise Perez
- Area^{1}: 6.09 km^{2} (2.35 sq mi)
- Elevation: 75 m (246 ft)
- Highest elevation: 220 m (720 ft)
- Lowest elevation: 53 m (174 ft)
- Population (2023): 214
  - Density: 35.1/km^{2} (91.0/sq mi)
- Time zone: UTC+01:00 (CET)
  - Summer (DST): UTC+02:00 (CEST)
- INSEE/Postal code: 34026 /34210
- ^{1} French Land Register data, which excludes lakes, ponds, glaciers > 1 km^{2} (0.386 sq mi or 247 acres) and river estuaries.

Beaufort (French pronunciation: [bofɔʁ]; Languedocien: Baufòrt) is a commune in the Hérault department in the Occitanie region in southern France.

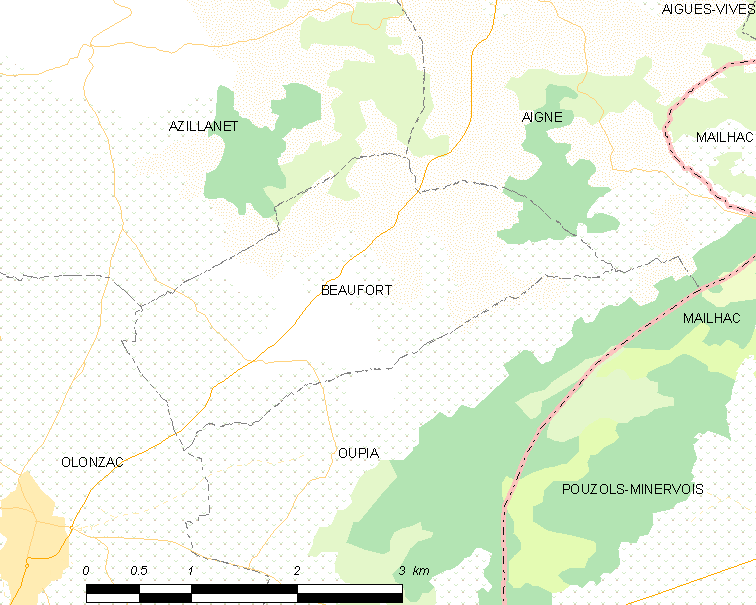
Map

== Population ==
Historical population
Year	Pop.	±% p.a.
1968	194	—
1975	156	−3.07%
1982	161	+0.45%
1990	161	+0.00%
1999	155	−0.42%
2007	170	+1.16%
2012	202	+3.51%
2017	219	+1.63%
2023	214	−0.38%
Source: INSEE

== See also ==
- Communes of the Hérault department
