= Saint-Martin-de-l'Arçon =

- Commune
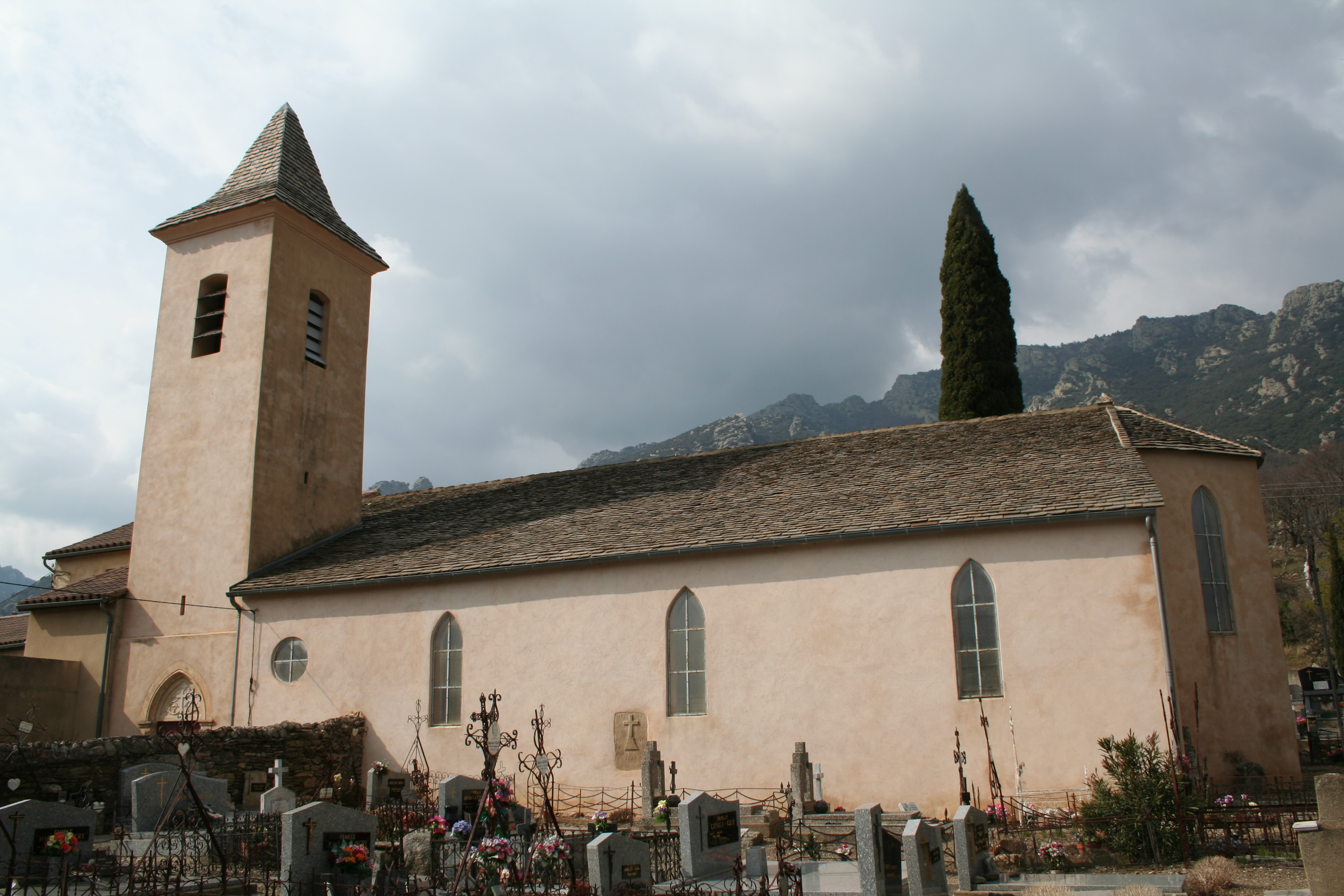
- The church of Saint-Martin-de-l'Arçon

- Coat of arms
- Location of Saint-Martin-de-l'Arçon
- Location within France Location within Occitanie
- Coordinates: 43°34′33″N 2°59′02″E
- Country: France
- Region: Occitania
- Department: Hérault
- Arrondissement: Béziers
- Canton: Saint-Pons-de-Thomières

Government
  - Mayor (2020–2026): Thierry Salles-Blayac
- Area^{1}: 4.22 km^{2} (1.63 sq mi)
- Elevation: 282 m (925 ft)
- Highest elevation: 1,065 m (3,494 ft)
- Lowest elevation: 120 m (390 ft)
- Population (2023): 101
  - Density: 23.9/km^{2} (62.0/sq mi)
- Time zone: UTC+01:00 (CET)
  - Summer (DST): UTC+02:00 (CEST)
- INSEE/Postal code: 34273 /34390
- ^{1} French Land Register data, which excludes lakes, ponds, glaciers > 1 km^{2} (0.386 sq mi or 247 acres) and river estuaries.

Saint-Martin-de-l'Arçon (French pronunciation: [sɛ̃ maʁtɛ̃ də laʁsɔ̃]; Languedocien: Sant Martin de l'Arçon) is a commune in the Hérault department in the Occitanie region in southern France.

== Population ==
Historical population
Year	Pop.	±% p.a.
1968	115	—
1975	107	−1.02%
1982	110	+0.40%
1990	103	−0.82%
1999	118	+1.52%
2007	144	+2.52%
2012	114	−4.56%
2017	139	+4.05%
2023	101	−5.18%
Source: INSEE

== See also ==
- Communes of the Hérault department
