= Cébazan =

- Commune
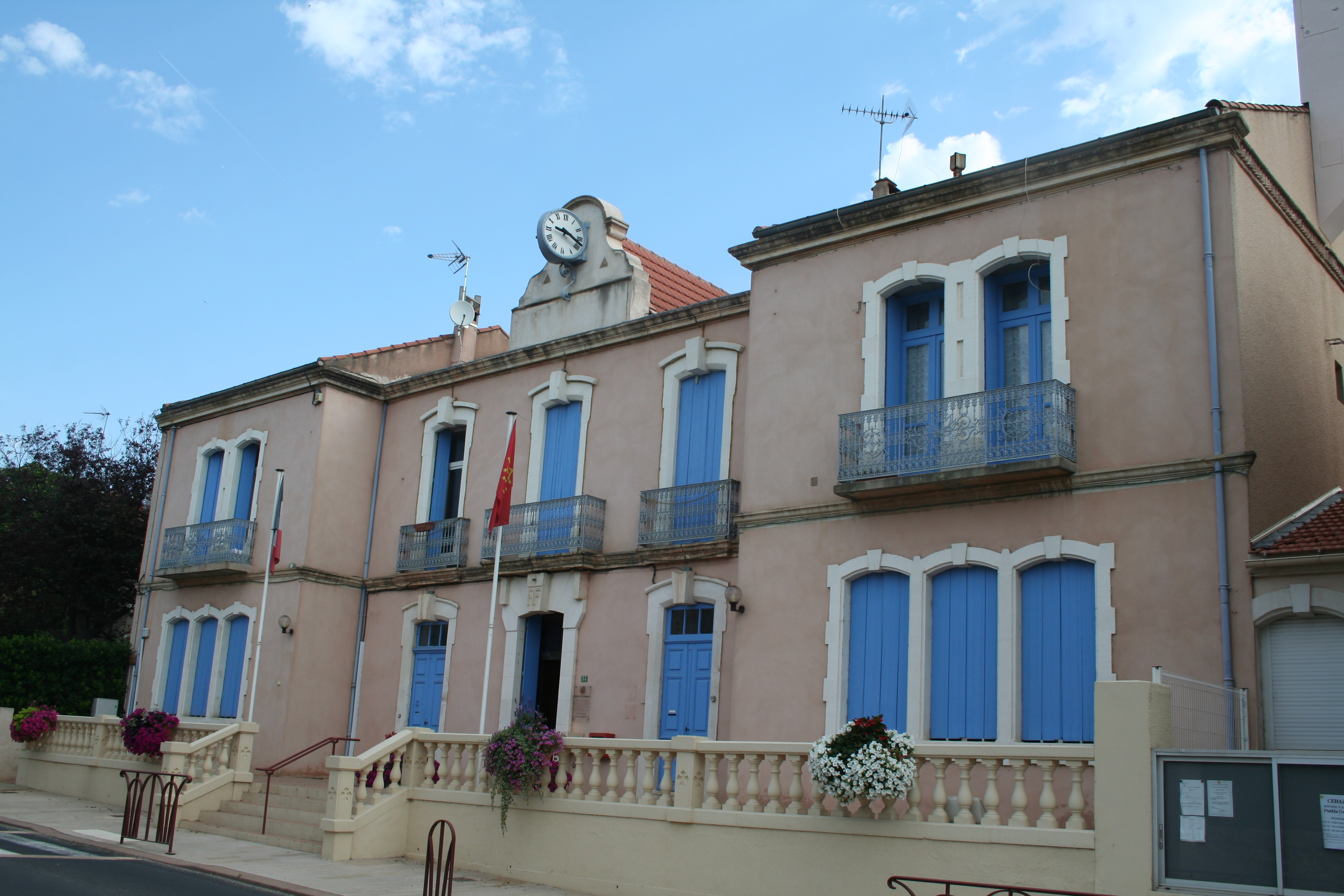
- Town hall

- Coat of arms
- Location of Cébazan
- Location within France Location within Occitanie
- Coordinates: 43°24′16″N 2°58′31″E
- Country: France
- Region: Occitania
- Department: Hérault
- Arrondissement: Béziers
- Canton: Saint-Pons-de-Thomières

Government
  - Mayor (2020–2026): Marc Fidel
- Area^{1}: 13.03 km^{2} (5.03 sq mi)
- Elevation: 151 m (495 ft)
- Highest elevation: 268 m (879 ft)
- Lowest elevation: 112 m (367 ft)
- Population (2023): 646
  - Density: 49.6/km^{2} (128/sq mi)
- Time zone: UTC+01:00 (CET)
  - Summer (DST): UTC+02:00 (CEST)
- INSEE/Postal code: 34070 /34360
- ^{1} French Land Register data, which excludes lakes, ponds, glaciers > 1 km^{2} (0.386 sq mi or 247 acres) and river estuaries.

Cébazan (French pronunciation: [sebazɑ̃]; Languedocien: Cebasan) is a commune in the Hérault department in the south of France.

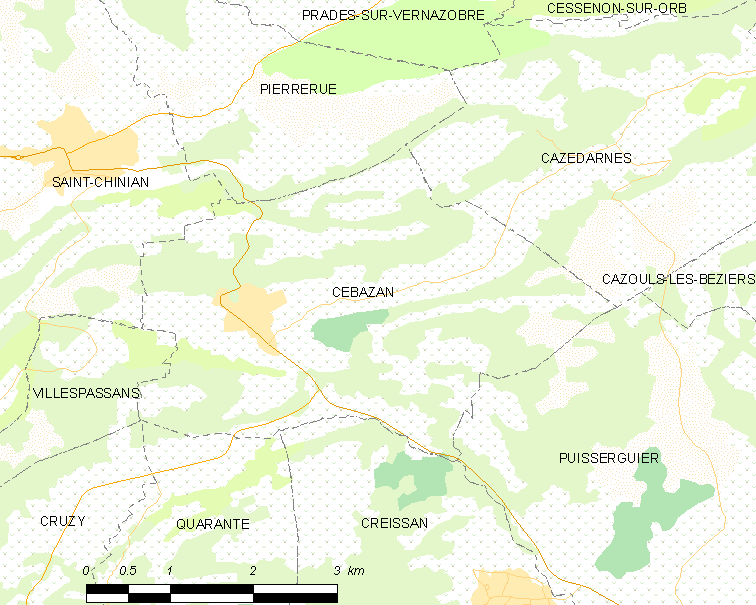
Map

== Population ==
Historical population
Year	Pop.	±% p.a.
1968	420	—
1975	368	−1.87%
1982	376	+0.31%
1990	377	+0.03%
1999	343	−1.04%
2007	477	+4.21%
2012	560	+3.26%
2017	616	+1.92%
2023	646	+0.80%
Source: INSEE

== See also ==
- Communes of the Hérault department
