= Cambon-et-Salvergues =

- Commune
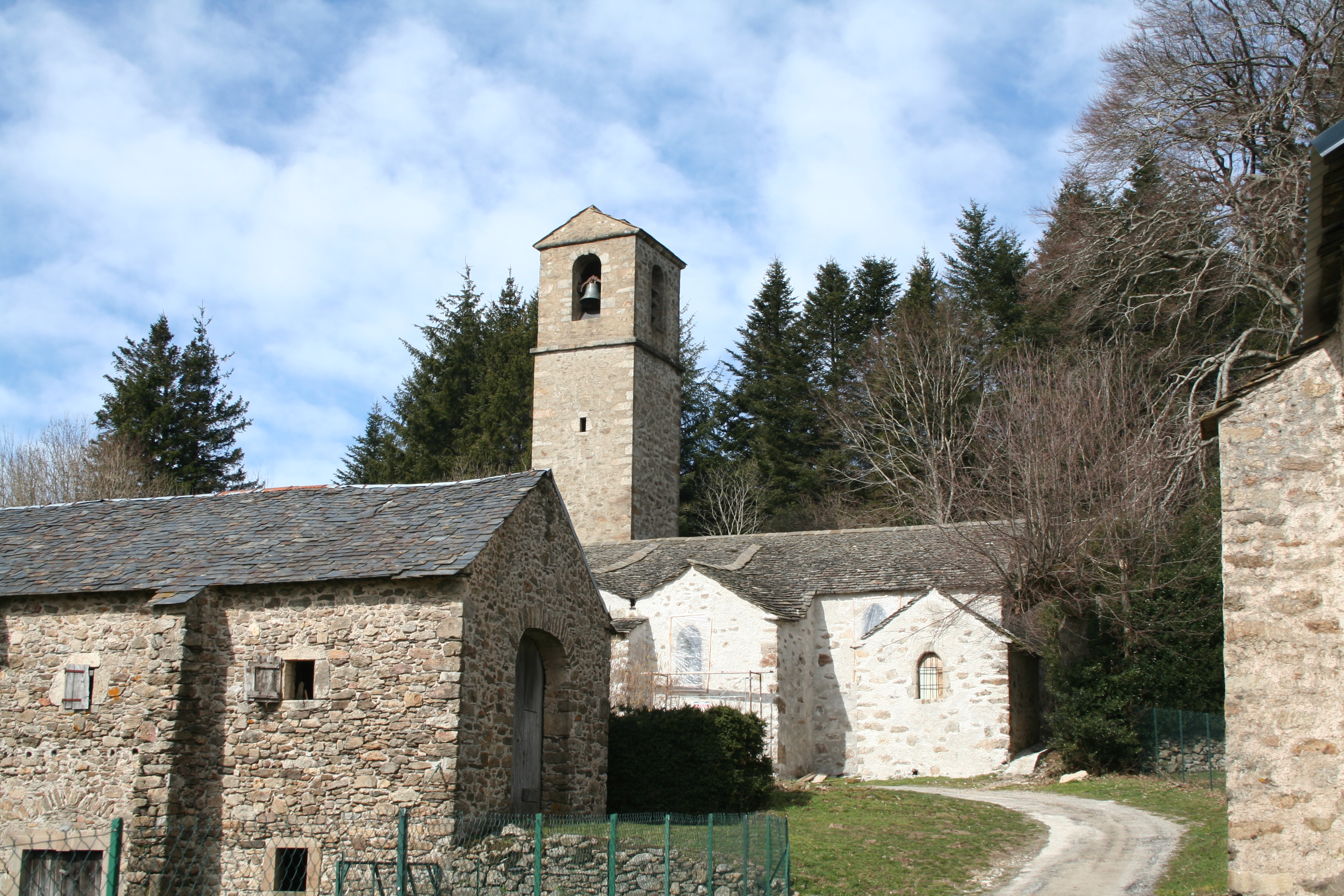
- Salvergues

- Coat of arms
- Location of Cambon-et-Salvergues
- Location within France Location within Occitanie
- Coordinates: 43°37′08″N 2°51′33″E
- Country: France
- Region: Occitania
- Department: Hérault
- Arrondissement: Béziers
- Canton: Saint-Pons-de-Thomières
- Intercommunality: CC du Haut-Languedoc

Government
  - Mayor (2020–2026): Marie Casares
- Area^{1}: 50.39 km^{2} (19.46 sq mi)
- Elevation: 1,000 m (3,300 ft)
- Highest elevation: 1,152 m (3,780 ft)
- Lowest elevation: 511 m (1,677 ft)
- Population (2023): 52
  - Density: 1.0/km^{2} (2.7/sq mi)
- Time zone: UTC+01:00 (CET)
  - Summer (DST): UTC+02:00 (CEST)
- INSEE/Postal code: 34046 /34330
- ^{1} French Land Register data, which excludes lakes, ponds, glaciers > 1 km^{2} (0.386 sq mi or 247 acres) and river estuaries.

Cambon-et-Salvergues (French pronunciation: [kɑ̃bɔ̃ e salvɛʁɡ]; Occitan: Cambon e Salvèrgas) is a commune in the Hérault department in southern France.

== Geography ==
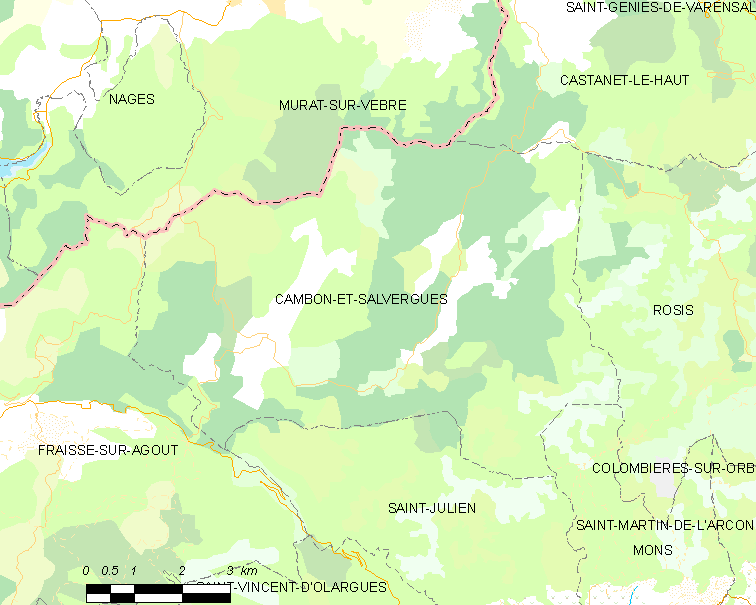
Map

=== Climate ===
Cambon-et-Salvergues has a warm-summer mediterranean climate (Köppen climate classification Csb). The average annual temperature in Cambon-et-Salvergues is 9.4 °C (48.9 °F). The average annual rainfall is 1,477.6 mm (58.17 in) with October as the wettest month. The temperatures are highest on average in August, at around 17.3 °C (63.1 °F), and lowest in January, at around 2.3 °C (36.1 °F). The highest temperature ever recorded in Cambon-et-Salvergues was 35.9 °C (96.6 °F) on 12 August 2003; the coldest temperature ever recorded was −16.5 °C (2.3 °F) on 1 March 2005.

Climate data for Cambon-et-Salvergues (1981–2010 averages, extremes 1998−present)
| Month | Jan | Feb | Mar | Apr | May | Jun | Jul | Aug | Sep | Oct | Nov | Dec | Year |
|---|---|---|---|---|---|---|---|---|---|---|---|---|---|
| Record high °C (°F) | 18.0 (64.4) | 22.0 (71.6) | 22.4 (72.3) | 25.6 (78.1) | 29.2 (84.6) | 34.1 (93.4) | 34.0 (93.2) | 35.9 (96.6) | 30.0 (86.0) | 26.5 (79.7) | 22.0 (71.6) | 21.0 (69.8) | 35.9 (96.6) |
| Mean daily maximum °C (°F) | 5.6 (42.1) | 5.9 (42.6) | 9.3 (48.7) | 11.9 (53.4) | 16.6 (61.9) | 21.6 (70.9) | 23.1 (73.6) | 23.2 (73.8) | 19.0 (66.2) | 14.4 (57.9) | 8.4 (47.1) | 6.1 (43.0) | 13.8 (56.8) |
| Daily mean °C (°F) | 2.3 (36.1) | 2.5 (36.5) | 5.1 (41.2) | 7.6 (45.7) | 11.8 (53.2) | 16.0 (60.8) | 17.1 (62.8) | 17.3 (63.1) | 13.7 (56.7) | 10.6 (51.1) | 5.0 (41.0) | 2.8 (37.0) | 9.4 (48.9) |
| Mean daily minimum °C (°F) | −0.9 (30.4) | −0.9 (30.4) | 0.9 (33.6) | 3.2 (37.8) | 7.0 (44.6) | 10.5 (50.9) | 11.1 (52.0) | 11.5 (52.7) | 8.4 (47.1) | 6.7 (44.1) | 1.7 (35.1) | −0.6 (30.9) | 4.9 (40.8) |
| Record low °C (°F) | −13.2 (8.2) | −15.1 (4.8) | −16.5 (2.3) | −5.0 (23.0) | −3.0 (26.6) | −1.1 (30.0) | 3.3 (37.9) | 4.0 (39.2) | −1.0 (30.2) | −6.1 (21.0) | −12.2 (10.0) | −13.3 (8.1) | −16.5 (2.3) |
| Average precipitation mm (inches) | 155.5 (6.12) | 128.7 (5.07) | 99.0 (3.90) | 139.6 (5.50) | 108.8 (4.28) | 62.3 (2.45) | 39.3 (1.55) | 65.1 (2.56) | 115.5 (4.55) | 193.5 (7.62) | 189.5 (7.46) | 180.8 (7.12) | 1,477.6 (58.17) |
| Average precipitation days (≥ 1.0 mm) | 12.1 | 10.2 | 10.2 | 10.8 | 9.4 | 6.4 | 4.9 | 6.3 | 7.2 | 11.7 | 11.4 | 11.4 | 111.8 |
Source: Meteociel

== Population ==
Historical population
| Year | Pop. | ±% p.a. |
|---|---|---|
| 1968 | 120 | — |
| 1975 | 94 | −3.43% |
| 1982 | 77 | −2.81% |
| 1990 | 69 | −1.36% |
| 1999 | 74 | +0.78% |
| 2007 | 85 | +1.75% |
| 2012 | 59 | −7.04% |
| 2017 | 48 | −4.04% |
| 2023 | 52 | +1.34% |
Source: INSEE

== See also ==
- Communes of the Hérault department
