= Prémian =

- Commune
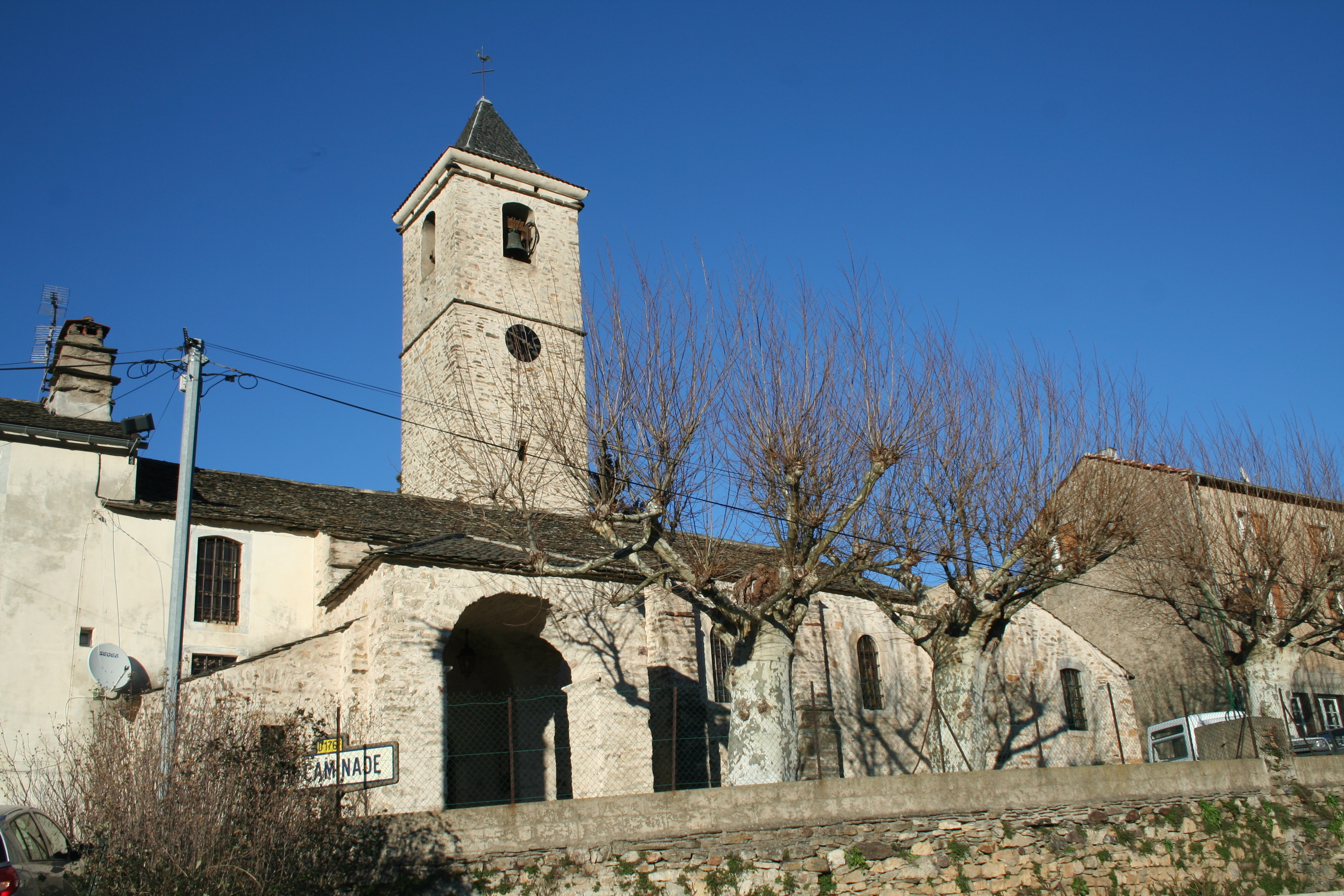
- The church of Saint-Sébastien

- Coat of arms
- Location of Prémian
- Location within France Location within Occitanie
- Coordinates: 43°31′30″N 2°49′52″E
- Country: France
- Region: Occitania
- Department: Hérault
- Arrondissement: Béziers
- Canton: Saint-Pons-de-Thomières

Government
  - Mayor (2020–2026): Roland Coutou
- Area^{1}: 16.69 km^{2} (6.44 sq mi)
- Elevation: 256 m (840 ft)
- Highest elevation: 1,111 m (3,645 ft)
- Lowest elevation: 218 m (715 ft)
- Population (2023): 479
  - Density: 28.7/km^{2} (74.3/sq mi)
- Time zone: UTC+01:00 (CET)
  - Summer (DST): UTC+02:00 (CEST)
- INSEE/Postal code: 34219 /34390
- ^{1} French Land Register data, which excludes lakes, ponds, glaciers > 1 km^{2} (0.386 sq mi or 247 acres) and river estuaries.

Prémian (French pronunciation: [pʁemjɑ̃]; Occitan: Prumian) is a commune in the Hérault department in the Occitanie region in southern France.

== Population ==
Historical population
Year	Pop.	±% p.a.
1968	354	—
1975	347	−0.28%
1982	378	+1.23%
1990	407	+0.93%
1999	405	−0.05%
2007	494	+2.51%
2012	557	+2.43%
2017	518	−1.44%
2023	479	−1.30%
Source: INSEE

== See also ==
- Communes of the Hérault department
