= Cazedarnes =

- Commune
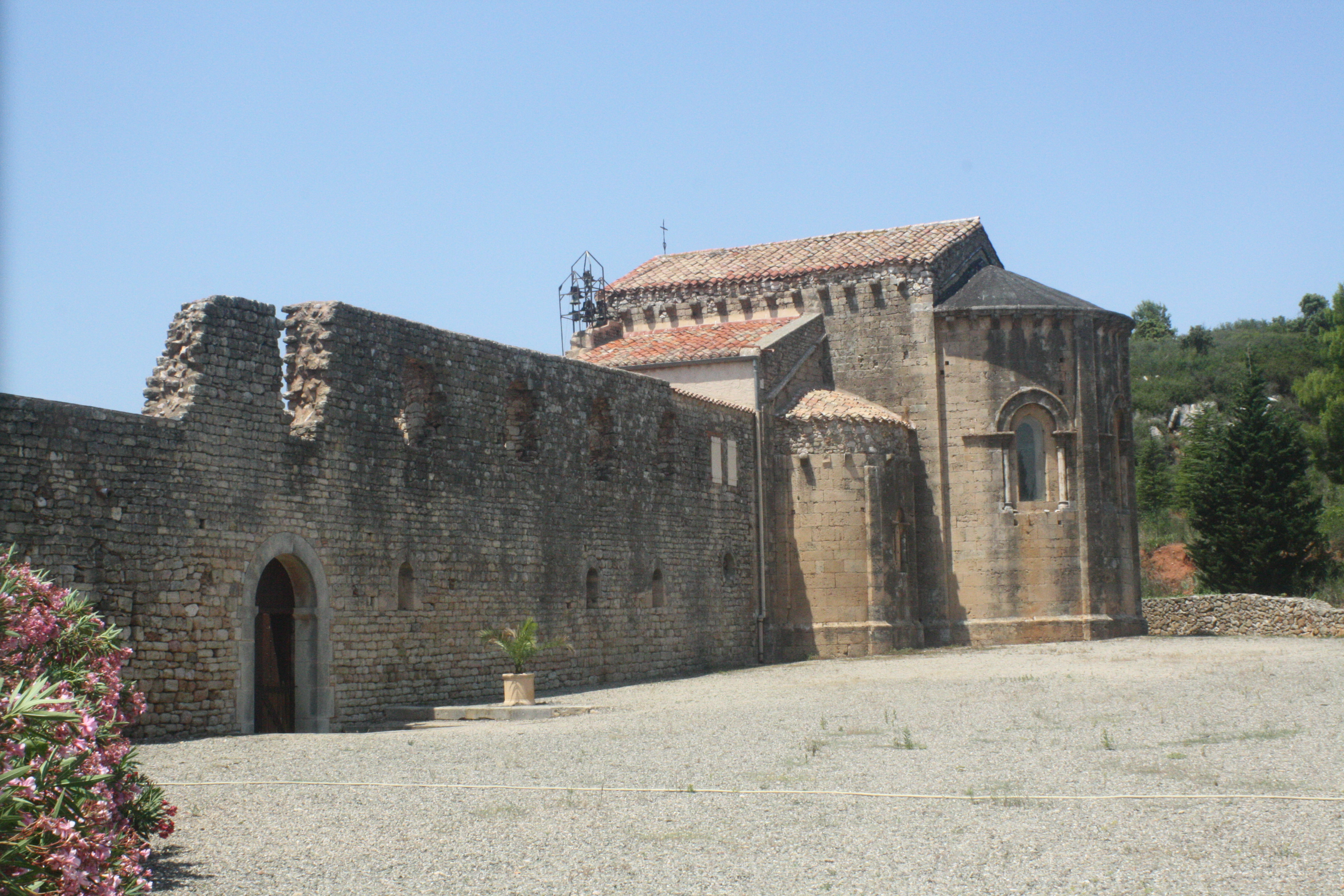
- Abbey of Fontcaude

- Coat of arms
- Location of Cazedarnes
- Location within France Location within Occitanie
- Coordinates: 43°25′31″N 3°01′45″E
- Country: France
- Region: Occitania
- Department: Hérault
- Arrondissement: Béziers
- Canton: Saint-Pons-de-Thomières

Government
  - Mayor (2020–2026): Thierry Cazals
- Area^{1}: 11.64 km^{2} (4.49 sq mi)
- Elevation: 150 m (490 ft)
- Highest elevation: 251 m (823 ft)
- Lowest elevation: 98 m (322 ft)
- Population (2023): 682
  - Density: 58.6/km^{2} (152/sq mi)
- Time zone: UTC+01:00 (CET)
  - Summer (DST): UTC+02:00 (CEST)
- INSEE/Postal code: 34065 /34460
- ^{1} French Land Register data, which excludes lakes, ponds, glaciers > 1 km^{2} (0.386 sq mi or 247 acres) and river estuaries.

Cazedarnes (French pronunciation: [kazdaʁn]; Occitan: Casa d'Arnas) is a commune in the Hérault department in southern France.

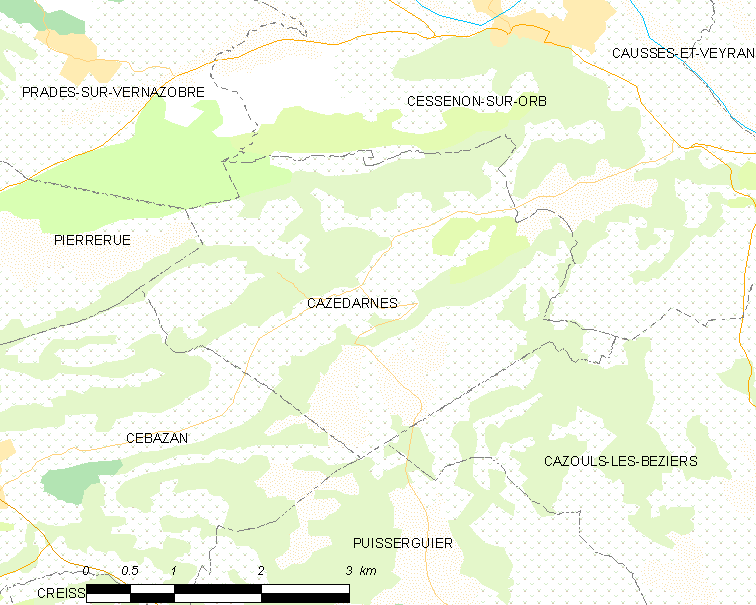
Map

== Population ==
Historical population
Year	Pop.	±% p.a.
1968	353	—
1975	284	−3.06%
1982	300	+0.79%
1990	329	+1.16%
1999	394	+2.02%
2007	474	+2.34%
2012	557	+3.28%
2017	601	+1.53%
2023	682	+2.13%
Source: INSEE

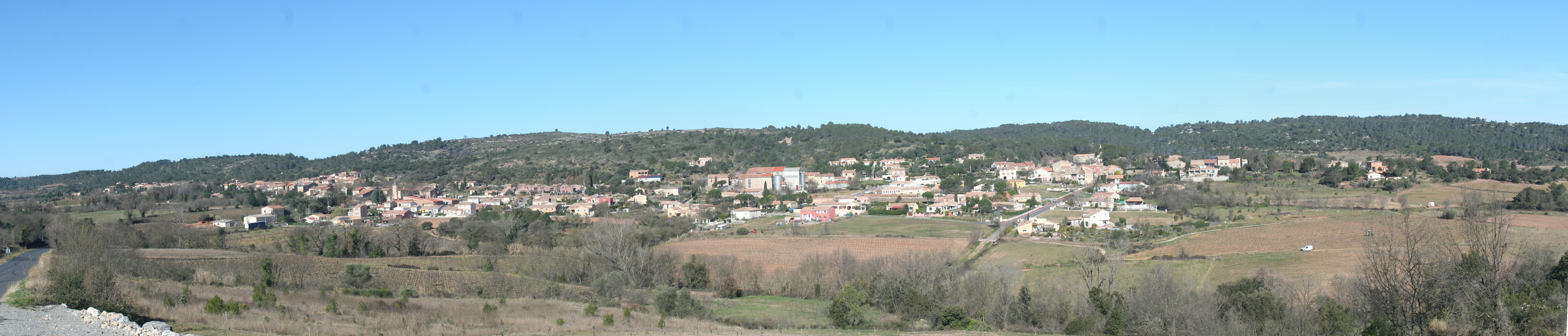
Panorama.

== See also ==
- Communes of the Hérault department
