= Agel =

- Commune
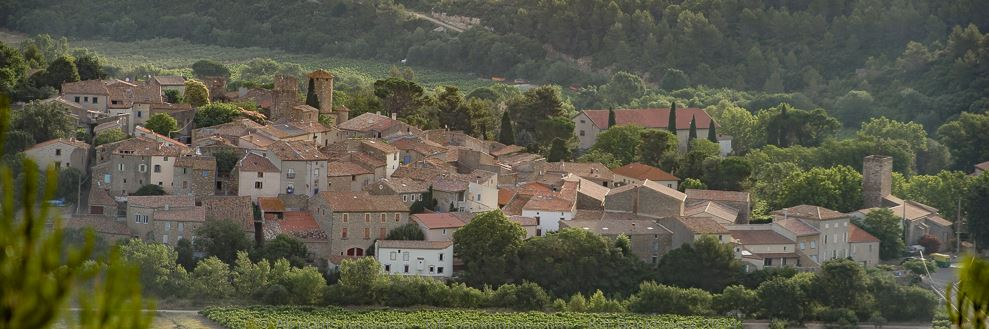
- Panoramic view of Agel

- Coat of arms
- Location of Agel
- Location within France Location within Occitanie
- Coordinates: 43°20′19″N 2°51′14″E
- Country: France
- Region: Occitania
- Department: Hérault
- Arrondissement: Béziers
- Canton: Saint-Pons-de-Thomières
- Intercommunality: CC du Minervois au Caroux

Government
  - Mayor (2020–2026): Patrick Cabrol
- Area^{1}: 12.54 km^{2} (4.84 sq mi)
- Elevation: 90 m (300 ft)
- Highest elevation: 257 m (843 ft)
- Lowest elevation: 70 m (230 ft)
- Population (2023): 240
  - Density: 19/km^{2} (50/sq mi)
- Time zone: UTC+01:00 (CET)
  - Summer (DST): UTC+02:00 (CEST)
- INSEE/Postal code: 34004 /34210
- ^{1} French Land Register data, which excludes lakes, ponds, glaciers > 1 km^{2} (0.386 sq mi or 247 acres) and river estuaries.

Agel (French pronunciation: [aʒɛl]; Languedocien: Agèl) is a commune in the Hérault department in the Occitanie region in southern France.

== Population ==
Historical population
Year	Pop.	±% p.a.
1968	249	—
1975	218	−1.88%
1982	204	−0.94%
1990	166	−2.54%
1999	167	+0.07%
2007	201	+2.34%
2012	214	+1.26%
2017	235	+1.89%
2023	240	+0.35%
Source: INSEE

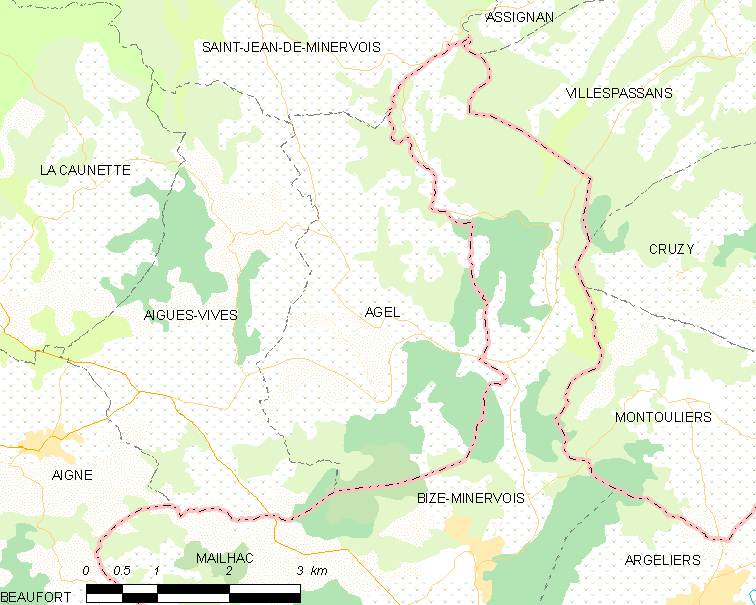
Map

== See also ==
- Communes of the Hérault department
