= Soulie =

Soulie or Soulié is a surname. Notable people with the surname include:

- François Soulié (born 1978), Andorran cross country skier
- Gilbert Soulié (1800–1863), French Catholic missionary
- Frédéric Soulié (1800–47), French novelist and playwright
- André Soulié (1858-1905), French missionary and botanist
- George Soulié de Morant (1878–1955), French scholar and diplomat
- Jacques Soulie, Sri Lankan psychiatrist

== See also ==
- 13226 Soulié, a main-belt asteroid
- Le Soulié, a French commune
