= Montels =

Montels may refer to the following places in France:

- Montels, Ariège, a commune in the Ariège department
- Montels, Hérault, a commune in the Hérault department
- Montels, Tarn, a commune in the Tarn department
