= La Caunette =

- Commune
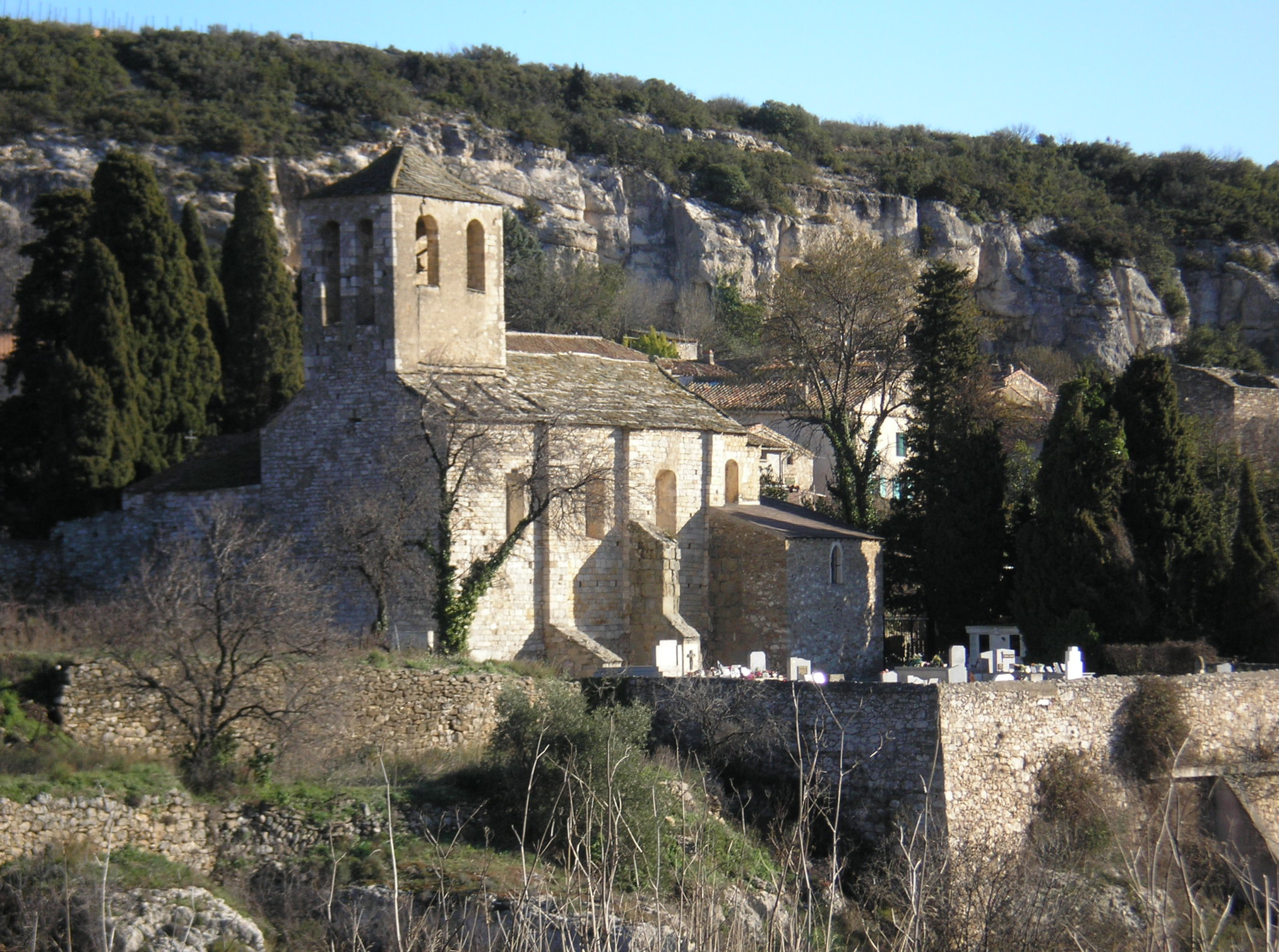
- Church Notre Dame

- Coat of arms
- Location of La Caunette
- Location within France Location within Occitanie
- Coordinates: 43°21′13″N 2°46′49″E
- Country: France
- Region: Occitania
- Department: Hérault
- Arrondissement: Béziers
- Canton: Saint-Pons-de-Thomières

Government
  - Mayor (2020–2026): Max Fabre
- Area^{1}: 21.78 km^{2} (8.41 sq mi)
- Elevation: 128 m (420 ft)
- Highest elevation: 483 m (1,585 ft)
- Lowest elevation: 112 m (367 ft)
- Population (2023): 326
  - Density: 15.0/km^{2} (38.8/sq mi)
- Time zone: UTC+01:00 (CET)
  - Summer (DST): UTC+02:00 (CEST)
- INSEE/Postal code: 34059 /34210
- ^{1} French Land Register data, which excludes lakes, ponds, glaciers > 1 km^{2} (0.386 sq mi or 247 acres) and river estuaries.

La Caunette (French pronunciation: [la konɛt]; Occitan: La Cauneta) is a commune in the Hérault department in southern France.

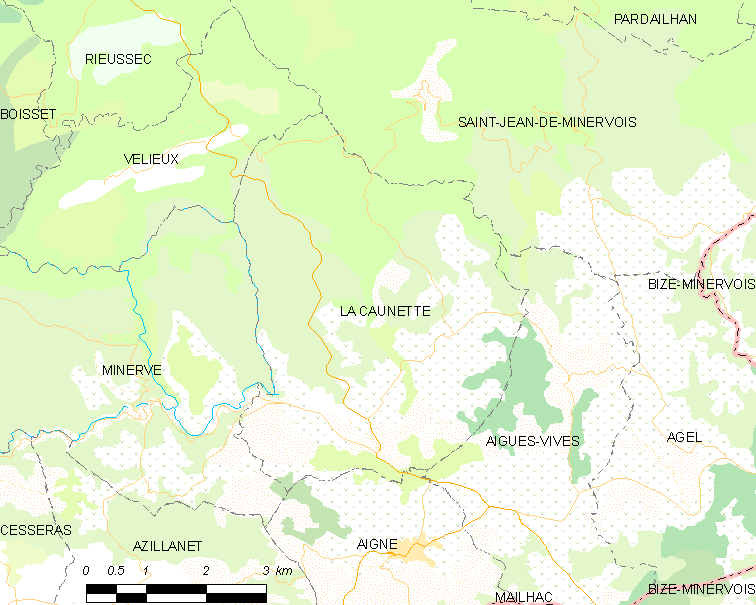
Map

== Population ==
Historical population
Year	Pop.	±% p.a.
1968	360	—
1975	311	−2.07%
1982	265	−2.26%
1990	293	+1.26%
1999	306	+0.48%
2007	324	+0.72%
2012	325	+0.06%
2017	306	−1.20%
2023	326	+1.06%
Source: INSEE

== See also ==
- Communes of the Hérault department
