= Poilhes =

- Commune
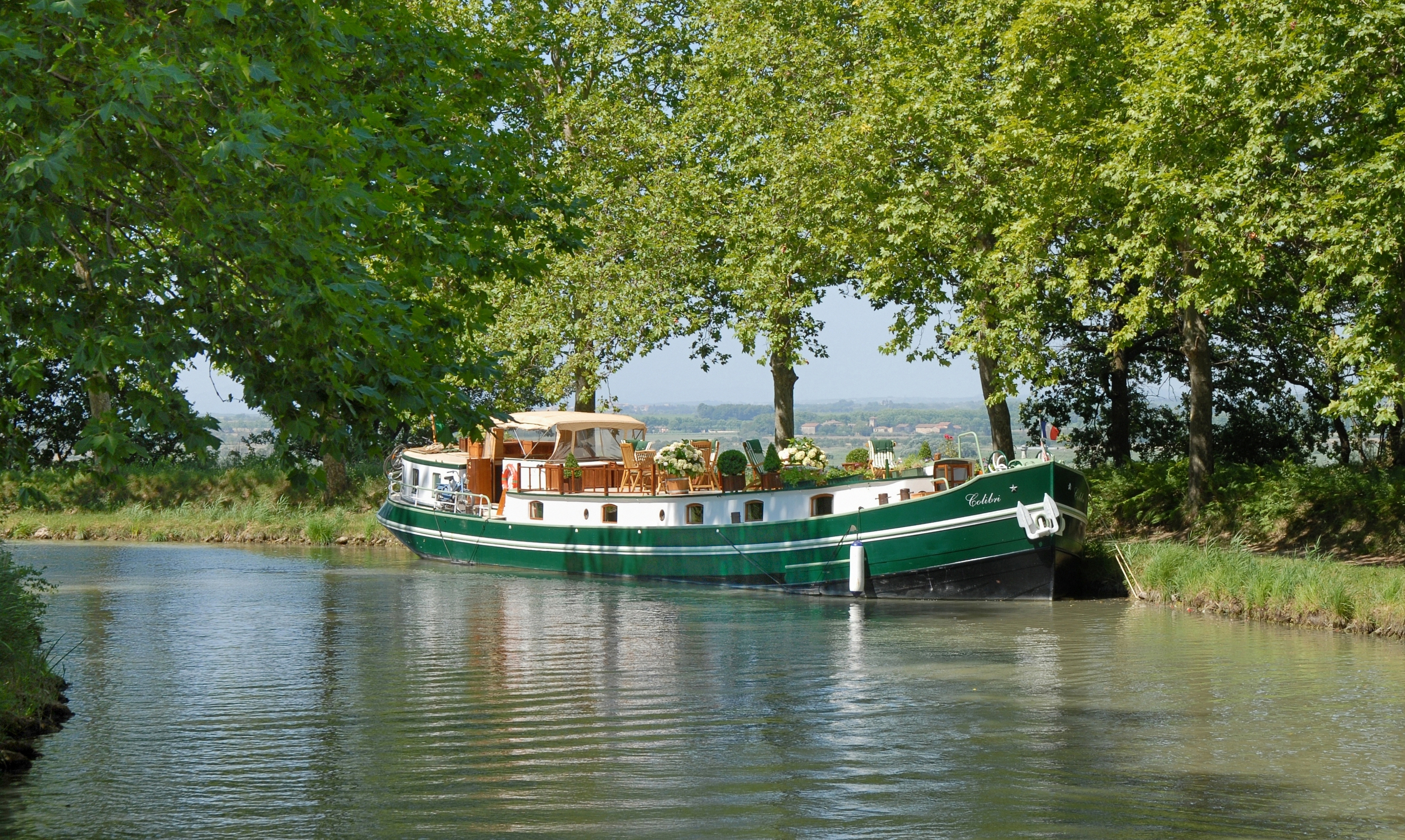
- Houseboat on the Canal du Midi

- Coat of arms
- Location of Poilhes
- Location within France Location within Occitanie
- Coordinates: 43°18′30″N 3°04′40″E
- Country: France
- Region: Occitania
- Department: Hérault
- Arrondissement: Béziers
- Canton: Saint-Pons-de-Thomières

Government
  - Mayor (2020–2026): Bérenger Sarda
- Area^{1}: 5.95 km^{2} (2.30 sq mi)
- Elevation: 33 m (108 ft)
- Highest elevation: 115 m (377 ft)
- Lowest elevation: 0 m (0 ft)
- Population (2023): 548
  - Density: 92.1/km^{2} (239/sq mi)
- Time zone: UTC+01:00 (CET)
  - Summer (DST): UTC+02:00 (CEST)
- INSEE/Postal code: 34206 /34310
- ^{1} French Land Register data, which excludes lakes, ponds, glaciers > 1 km^{2} (0.386 sq mi or 247 acres) and river estuaries.

Poilhes (/pɔj/) is a commune in the Hérault department in the Occitanie region in southern France.

== Population ==
Historical population
Year	Pop.	±% p.a.
1968	504	—
1975	405	−3.08%
1982	451	+1.55%
1990	517	+1.72%
1999	507	−0.22%
2007	491	−0.40%
2012	564	+2.81%
2017	559	−0.18%
2023	548	−0.33%
Source: INSEE

== See also ==
- Communes of the Hérault department
