= Vieussan =

- Commune
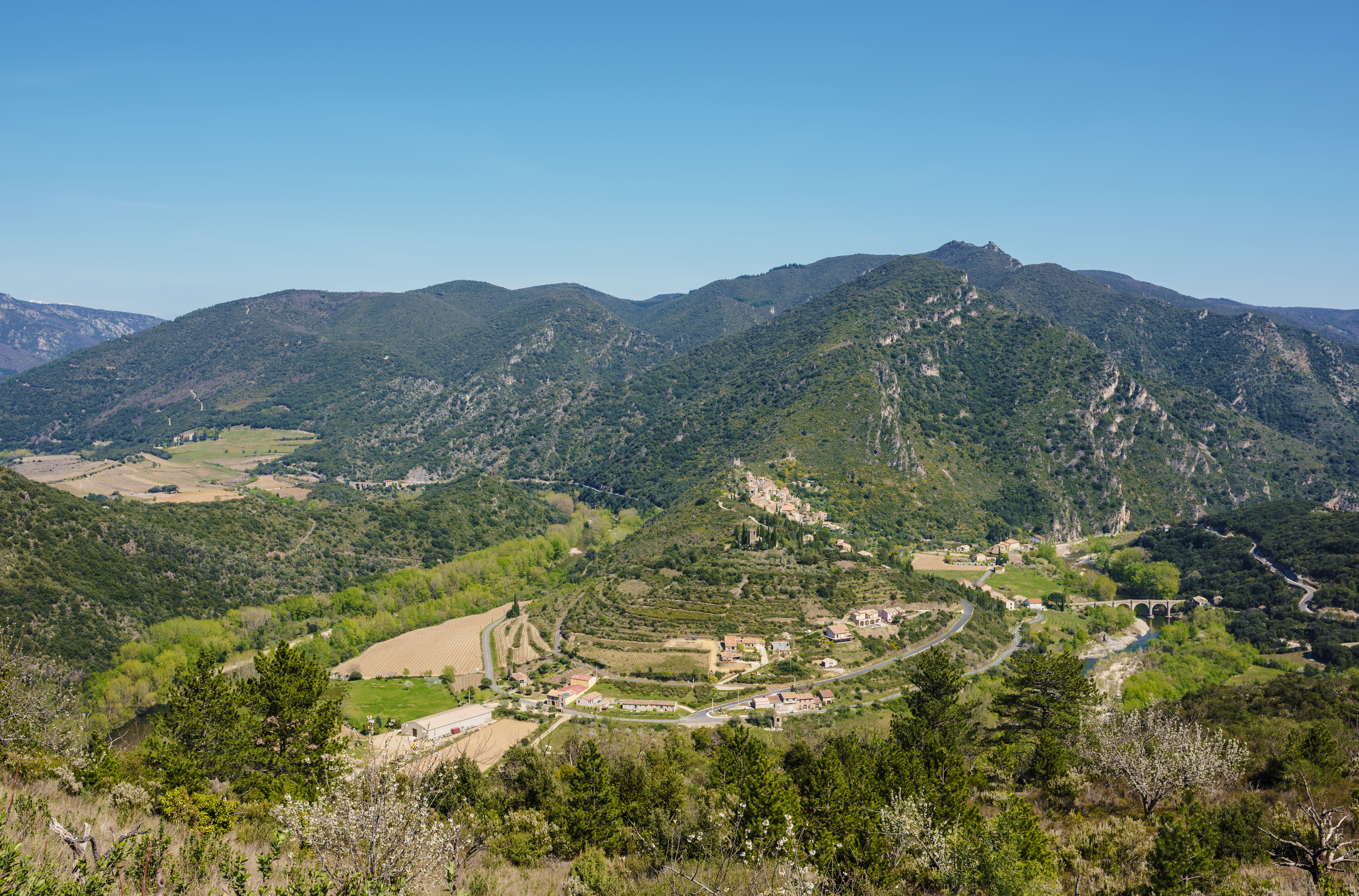
- A general view of Vieussan

- Coat of arms
- Location of Vieussan
- Location within France Location within Occitanie
- Coordinates: 43°32′30″N 2°58′40″E
- Country: France
- Region: Occitania
- Department: Hérault
- Arrondissement: Béziers
- Canton: Saint-Pons-de-Thomières
- Intercommunality: CC du Minervois au Caroux

Government
  - Mayor (2020–2026): Luc Guiraud
- Area^{1}: 28.26 km^{2} (10.91 sq mi)
- Elevation: 107 m (351 ft)
- Highest elevation: 733 m (2,405 ft)
- Lowest elevation: 84 m (276 ft)
- Population (2023): 267
  - Density: 9.45/km^{2} (24.5/sq mi)
- Time zone: UTC+01:00 (CET)
  - Summer (DST): UTC+02:00 (CEST)
- INSEE/Postal code: 34334 /34390
- ^{1} French Land Register data, which excludes lakes, ponds, glaciers > 1 km^{2} (0.386 sq mi or 247 acres) and river estuaries.

Vieussan (French pronunciation: [vjøsɑ̃]; Occitan: Viuça) is a commune in the Hérault department in the Occitanie region in southern France.

== Population ==
Historical population
| Year | Pop. | ±% p.a. |
|---|---|---|
| 1968 | 234 | — |
| 1975 | 232 | −0.12% |
| 1982 | 257 | +1.47% |
| 1990 | 256 | −0.05% |
| 1999 | 214 | −1.97% |
| 2007 | 263 | +2.61% |
| 2012 | 264 | +0.08% |
| 2017 | 266 | +0.15% |
| 2023 | 267 | +0.06% |
Source: INSEE

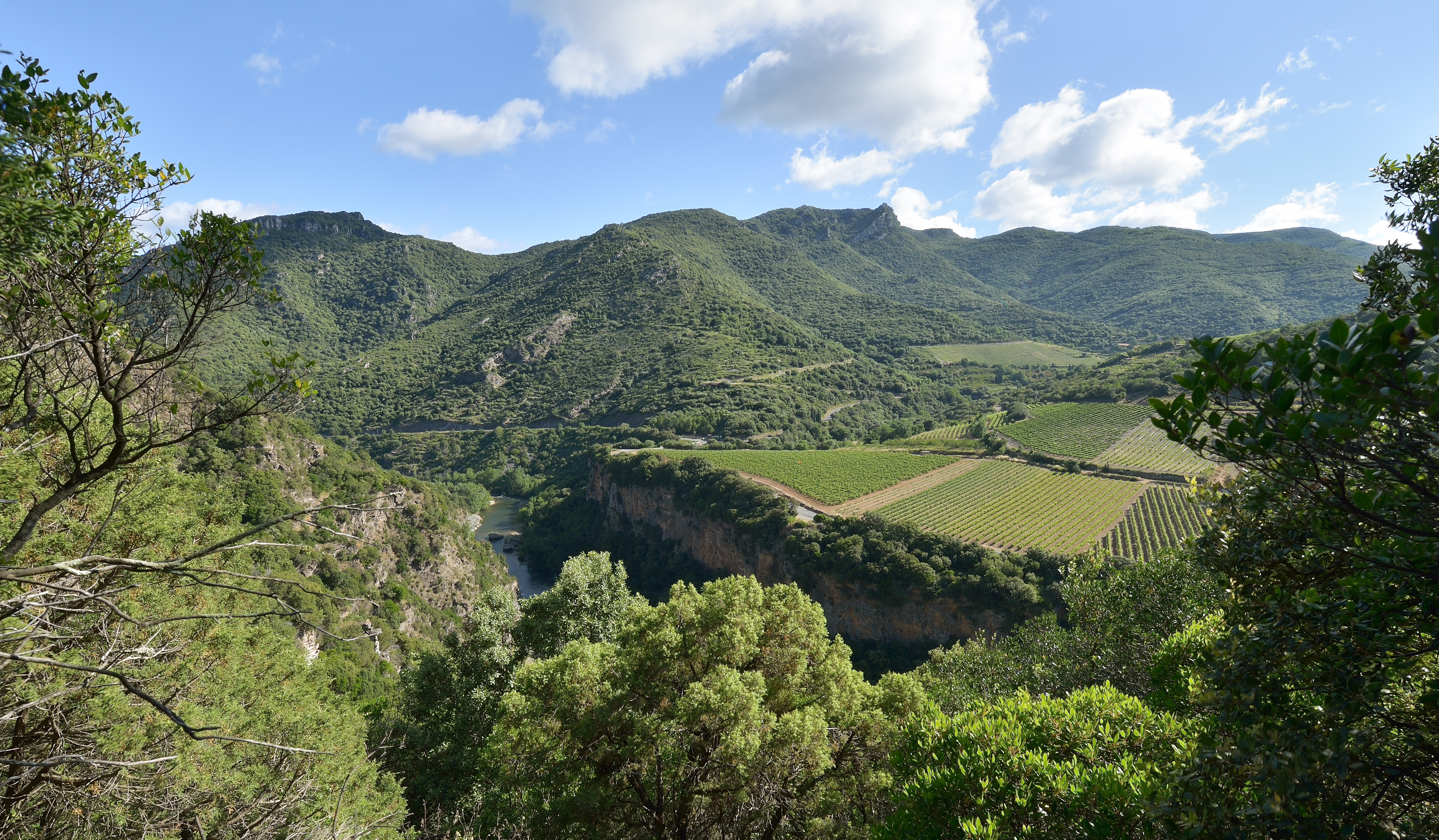
The Orb

== See also ==
- Communes of the Hérault department
