= Félines-Minervois =

- Commune
- Coat of arms
- Location of Félines-Minervois
- Location within France Location within Occitanie
- Coordinates: 43°19′48″N 2°36′05″E
- Country: France
- Region: Occitania
- Department: Hérault
- Arrondissement: Béziers
- Canton: Saint-Pons-de-Thomières

Government
  - Mayor (2020–2026): Anne Cabrié
- Area^{1}: 29.87 km^{2} (11.53 sq mi)
- Elevation: 149 m (489 ft)
- Highest elevation: 922 m (3,025 ft)
- Lowest elevation: 143 m (469 ft)
- Population (2023): 502
  - Density: 16.8/km^{2} (43.5/sq mi)
- Time zone: UTC+01:00 (CET)
  - Summer (DST): UTC+02:00 (CEST)
- INSEE/Postal code: 34097 /34210
- ^{1} French Land Register data, which excludes lakes, ponds, glaciers > 1 km^{2} (0.386 sq mi or 247 acres) and river estuaries.

Félines-Minervois (Occitan: Gat) is a commune in the Hérault department in southern France.

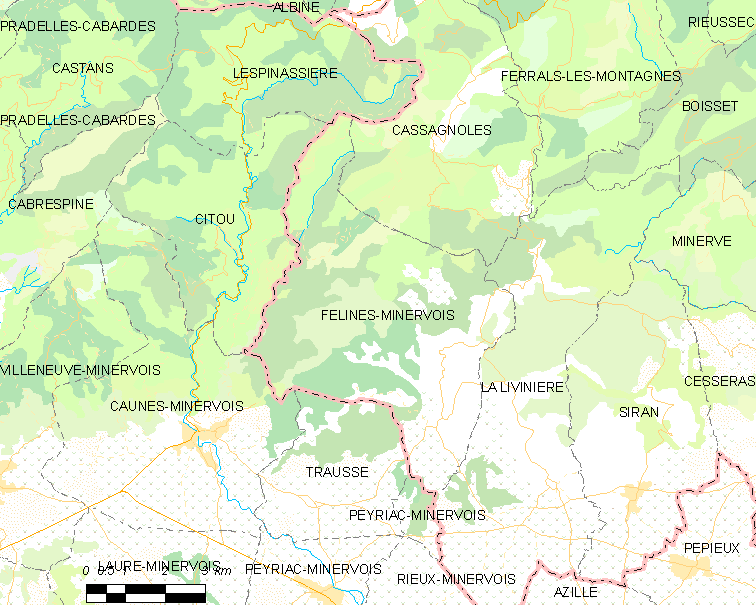
Map

== Population ==
Historical population
Year	Pop.	±% p.a.
1968	530	—
1975	467	−1.79%
1982	428	−1.24%
1990	394	−1.03%
1999	389	−0.14%
2007	377	−0.39%
2012	454	+3.79%
2017	478	+1.04%
2023	502	+0.82%
Source: INSEE

== See also ==
- Communes of the Hérault department
