= Riols =

- Commune
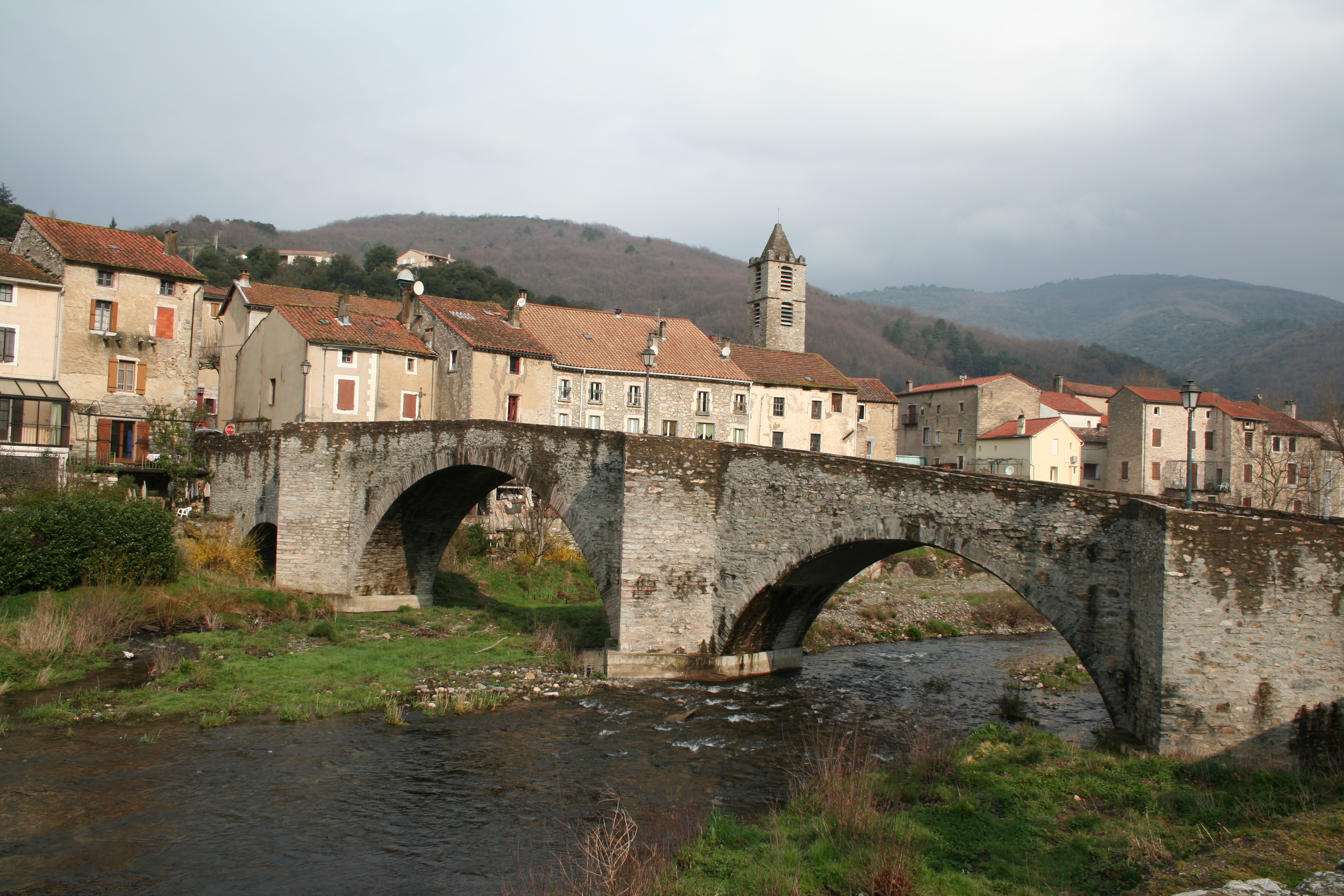
- Old bridge over the Jaur

- Coat of arms
- Location of Riols
- Location within France Location within Occitanie
- Coordinates: 43°30′21″N 2°47′34″E
- Country: France
- Region: Occitania
- Department: Hérault
- Arrondissement: Béziers
- Canton: Saint-Pons-de-Thomières

Government
  - Mayor (2020–2026): Jean-Marc Saleine
- Area^{1}: 56.02 km^{2} (21.63 sq mi)
- Elevation: 249 m (817 ft)
- Highest elevation: 1,060 m (3,480 ft)
- Lowest elevation: 253 m (830 ft)
- Population (2023): 708
  - Density: 12.6/km^{2} (32.7/sq mi)
- Time zone: UTC+01:00 (CET)
  - Summer (DST): UTC+02:00 (CEST)
- INSEE/Postal code: 34229 /34220
- ^{1} French Land Register data, which excludes lakes, ponds, glaciers > 1 km^{2} (0.386 sq mi or 247 acres) and river estuaries.

Riols (French pronunciation: [ʁjɔls]; Occitan: Riòls) is a commune in the Hérault department in the Occitanie region in southern France.

== Population ==
Historical population
Year	Pop.	±% p.a.
1968	664	—
1975	523	−3.35%
1982	646	+3.06%
1990	655	+0.17%
1999	684	+0.48%
2007	684	+0.00%
2012	766	+2.29%
2017	767	+0.03%
2023	708	−1.33%
Source: INSEE

== See also ==
- Communes of the Hérault department
