= Vélieux =

- Commune
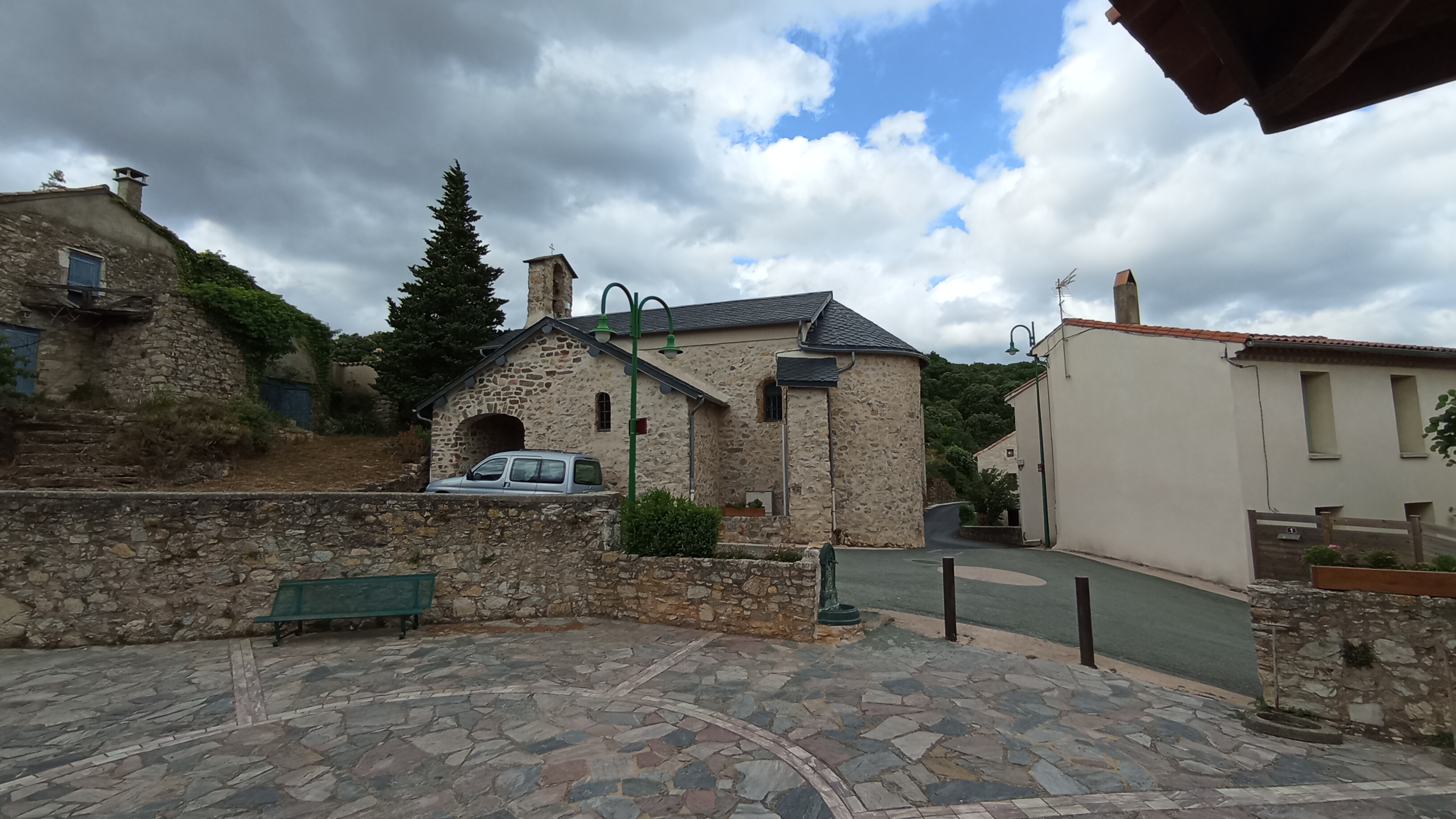

- Coat of arms
- Location of Vélieux
- Location within France Location within Occitanie
- Coordinates: 43°23′18″N 2°44′03″E
- Country: France
- Region: Occitania
- Department: Hérault
- Arrondissement: Béziers
- Canton: Saint-Pons-de-Thomières

Government
  - Mayor (2020–2026): Marie-Françoise Franc
- Area^{1}: 10.15 km^{2} (3.92 sq mi)
- Elevation: 450 m (1,480 ft)
- Highest elevation: 675 m (2,215 ft)
- Lowest elevation: 213 m (699 ft)
- Population (2023): 95
  - Density: 9.4/km^{2} (24/sq mi)
- Time zone: UTC+01:00 (CET)
  - Summer (DST): UTC+02:00 (CEST)
- INSEE/Postal code: 34326 /34220
- ^{1} French Land Register data, which excludes lakes, ponds, glaciers > 1 km^{2} (0.386 sq mi or 247 acres) and river estuaries.

Vélieux (French pronunciation: [veljø]; Occitan: Velius) is a commune in the Hérault department in the Occitanie region in southern France.

== Population ==
Historical population
Year	Pop.	±% p.a.
1968	37	—
1975	45	+2.84%
1982	44	−0.32%
1990	34	−3.17%
1999	50	+4.38%
2007	63	+2.93%
2012	68	+1.54%
2017	86	+4.81%
2023	95	+1.67%
Source: INSEE

== See also ==
- Communes of the Hérault department
