= Oupia =

- Commune
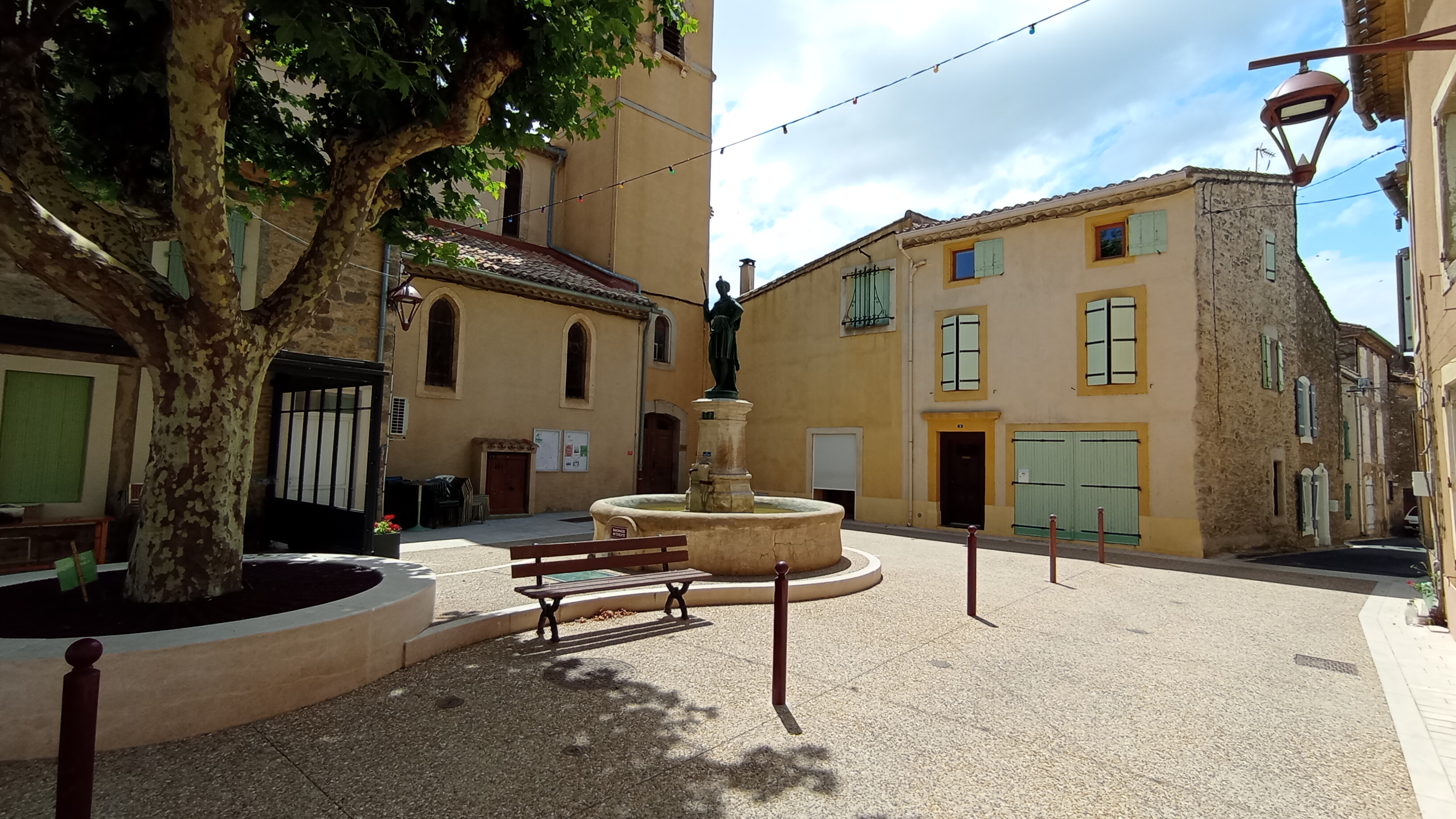

- Coat of arms
- Location of Oupia
- Location within France Location within Occitanie
- Coordinates: 43°17′27″N 2°46′02″E
- Country: France
- Region: Occitania
- Department: Hérault
- Arrondissement: Béziers
- Canton: Saint-Pons-de-Thomières
- Intercommunality: CC du Minervois au Caroux

Government
  - Mayor (2020–2026): Laurie Gomez
- Area^{1}: 9.04 km^{2} (3.49 sq mi)
- Elevation: 95 m (312 ft)
- Highest elevation: 295 m (968 ft)
- Lowest elevation: 50 m (160 ft)
- Population (2023): 274
  - Density: 30.3/km^{2} (78.5/sq mi)
- Time zone: UTC+01:00 (CET)
  - Summer (DST): UTC+02:00 (CEST)
- INSEE/Postal code: 34190 /34210
- ^{1} French Land Register data, which excludes lakes, ponds, glaciers > 1 km^{2} (0.386 sq mi or 247 acres) and river estuaries.

Oupia (French pronunciation: [upja]; Occitan: Opian) is a commune in the Hérault department in the Occitanie region in southern France.

== Population ==
Historical population
Year	Pop.	±% p.a.
1968	368	—
1975	314	−2.24%
1982	301	−0.60%
1990	252	−2.20%
1999	210	−2.01%
2007	287	+3.98%
2012	280	−0.49%
2017	245	−2.64%
2023	274	+1.88%
Source: INSEE

== See also ==
- Communes of the Hérault department
