= Berlou =

- Commune
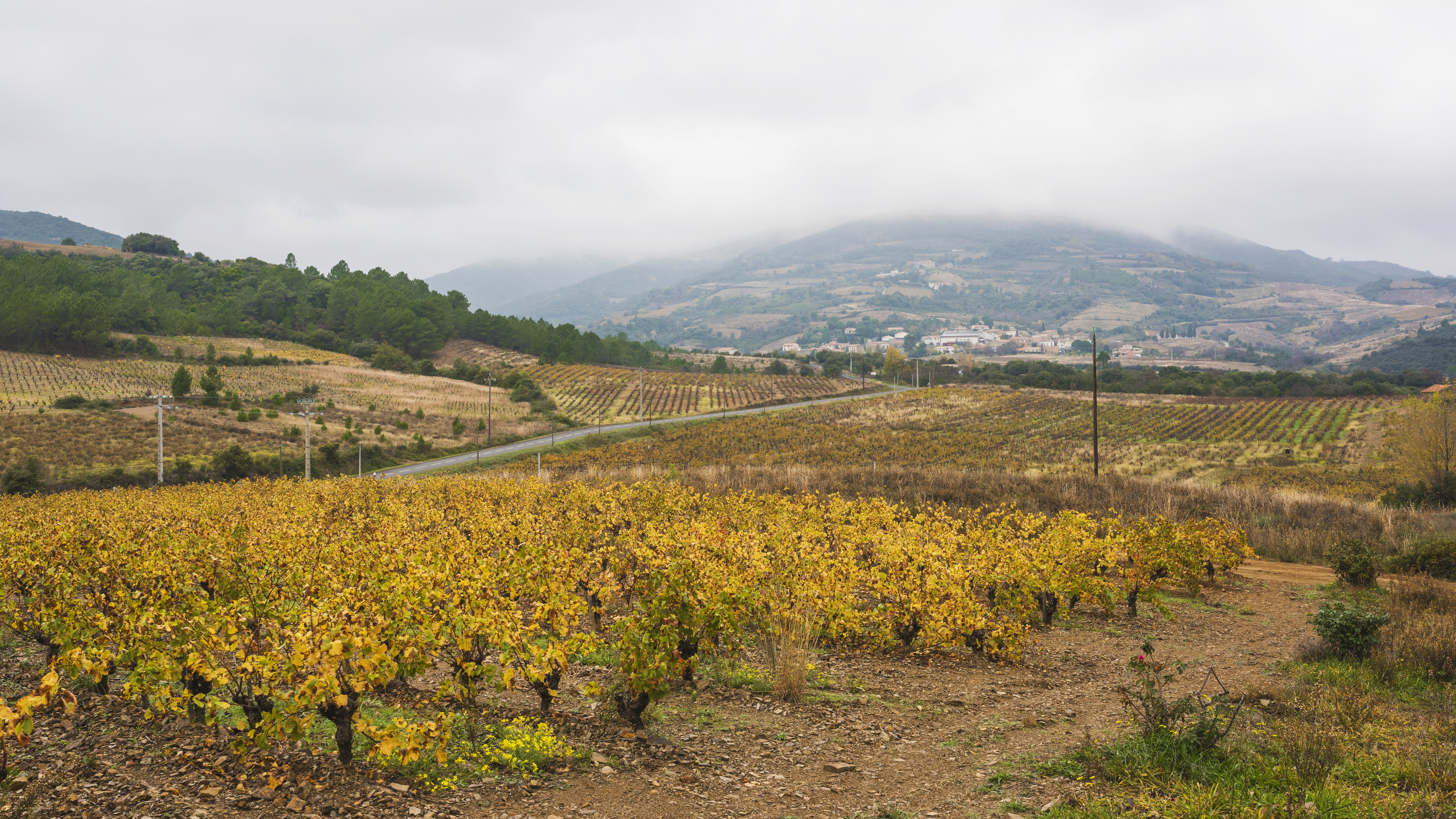
- Panoramic view

- Coat of arms
- Location of Berlou
- Location within France Location within Occitanie
- Coordinates: 43°29′28″N 2°57′24″E
- Country: France
- Region: Occitania
- Department: Hérault
- Arrondissement: Béziers
- Canton: Saint-Pons-de-Thomières

Government
  - Mayor (2020–2026): Christian Lignon
- Area^{1}: 11.34 km^{2} (4.38 sq mi)
- Elevation: 140 m (460 ft)
- Highest elevation: 680 m (2,230 ft)
- Lowest elevation: 130 m (430 ft)
- Population (2023): 211
  - Density: 18.6/km^{2} (48.2/sq mi)
- Time zone: UTC+01:00 (CET)
  - Summer (DST): UTC+02:00 (CEST)
- INSEE/Postal code: 34030 /34360
- ^{1} French Land Register data, which excludes lakes, ponds, glaciers > 1 km^{2} (0.386 sq mi or 247 acres) and river estuaries.

Berlou (French pronunciation: [bɛʁlu]; Occitan: Berlon) is a commune in the Hérault department in the Occitanie region in southern France.

== Geography ==
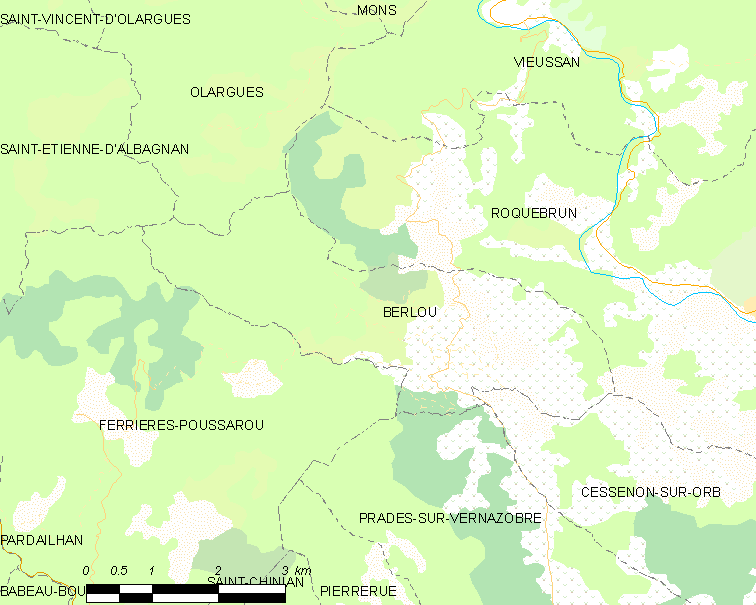
Map

=== Climate ===
Berlou has a mediterranean climate (Köppen climate classification Csa). The average annual temperature in Berlou is 15.2 °C (59.4 °F). The average annual rainfall is 908.5 mm (35.77 in) with October as the wettest month. The temperatures are highest on average in July, at around 23.9 °C (75.0 °F), and lowest in January, at around 8.0 °C (46.4 °F). The highest temperature ever recorded in Berlou was 42.1 °C (107.8 °F) on 28 June 2019; the coldest temperature ever recorded was −8.1 °C (17.4 °F) on 27 February 2018.

Climate data for Berlou (1981–2010 averages, extremes 1988−present)
Month	Jan	Feb	Mar	Apr	May	Jun	Jul	Aug	Sep	Oct	Nov	Dec	Year
Record high °C (°F)	21.0 (69.8)	24.5 (76.1)	28.5 (83.3)	32.0 (89.6)	35.9 (96.6)	42.1 (107.8)	37.5 (99.5)	40.9 (105.6)	36.5 (97.7)	32.4 (90.3)	25.4 (77.7)	20.9 (69.6)	42.1 (107.8)
Mean daily maximum °C (°F)	11.5 (52.7)	12.4 (54.3)	15.6 (60.1)	17.7 (63.9)	22.2 (72.0)	26.4 (79.5)	29.6 (85.3)	29.4 (84.9)	24.6 (76.3)	19.8 (67.6)	14.6 (58.3)	11.7 (53.1)	19.7 (67.5)
Daily mean °C (°F)	8.0 (46.4)	8.5 (47.3)	11.2 (52.2)	13.2 (55.8)	17.3 (63.1)	21.1 (70.0)	23.9 (75.0)	23.8 (74.8)	19.6 (67.3)	15.9 (60.6)	11.1 (52.0)	8.3 (46.9)	15.2 (59.4)
Mean daily minimum °C (°F)	4.5 (40.1)	4.5 (40.1)	6.9 (44.4)	8.7 (47.7)	12.3 (54.1)	15.8 (60.4)	18.3 (64.9)	18.2 (64.8)	14.6 (58.3)	12.0 (53.6)	7.6 (45.7)	4.9 (40.8)	10.7 (51.3)
Record low °C (°F)	−6.5 (20.3)	−8.1 (17.4)	−5.7 (21.7)	−0.6 (30.9)	3.5 (38.3)	8.0 (46.4)	10.0 (50.0)	11.0 (51.8)	5.5 (41.9)	0.4 (32.7)	−5.6 (21.9)	−5.4 (22.3)	−8.1 (17.4)
Average precipitation mm (inches)	82.1 (3.23)	73.5 (2.89)	51.7 (2.04)	80.9 (3.19)	70.3 (2.77)	38.6 (1.52)	23.7 (0.93)	48.2 (1.90)	86.7 (3.41)	136.8 (5.39)	107.6 (4.24)	108.4 (4.27)	908.5 (35.77)
Average precipitation days (≥ 1.0 mm)	7.7	5.8	5.6	8.0	6.8	3.9	3.2	4.4	4.8	7.4	7.0	7.4	71.9
Source: Meteociel

== Population ==
Historical population
Year	Pop.	±% p.a.
1968	267	—
1975	228	−2.23%
1982	203	−1.65%
1990	193	−0.63%
1999	184	−0.53%
2007	190	+0.40%
2012	198	+0.83%
2017	203	+0.50%
2023	211	+0.65%
Source: INSEE

== See also ==
- Communes of the Hérault department
