= Cassagnoles, Hérault =

Cassagnoles
- Commune
- Coat of arms
- Location of Cassagnoles
- Location within France Location within Occitanie
- Coordinates: 43°23′11″N 2°37′14″E
- Country: France
- Region: Occitania
- Department: Hérault
- Arrondissement: Béziers
- Canton: Saint-Pons-de-Thomières

Government
  - Mayor (2025–2026): Olivier Azéma
- Area^{1}: 24.54 km^{2} (9.47 sq mi)
- Elevation: 430 m (1,410 ft)
- Highest elevation: 1,005 m (3,297 ft)
- Lowest elevation: 280 m (920 ft)
- Population (2023): 109
  - Density: 4.44/km^{2} (11.5/sq mi)
- Time zone: UTC+01:00 (CET)
  - Summer (DST): UTC+02:00 (CEST)
- INSEE/Postal code: 34054 /34210
- ^{1} French Land Register data, which excludes lakes, ponds, glaciers > 1 km^{2} (0.386 sq mi or 247 acres) and river estuaries.

Cassagnoles (French pronunciation: [kasaɲɔl]; Occitan: Cassinhòlas) is a commune in the Hérault department in southern France.

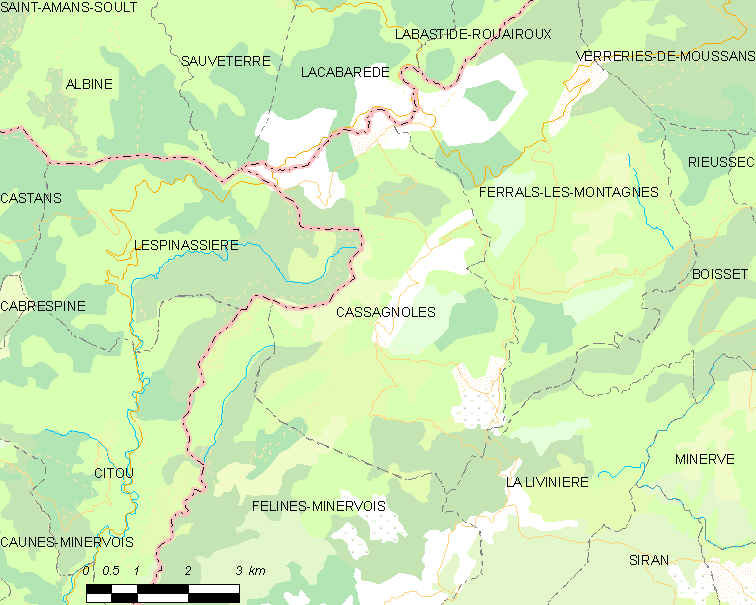
Map

== Population ==
Historical population
Year	Pop.	±% p.a.
1968	151	—
1975	127	−2.44%
1982	97	−3.78%
1990	91	−0.79%
1999	79	−1.56%
2007	80	+0.16%
2012	96	+3.71%
2017	99	+0.62%
2023	109	+1.62%
Source: INSEE

== See also ==
- Communes of the Hérault department
