= Pierrerue, Hérault =

Pierrerue
- Commune
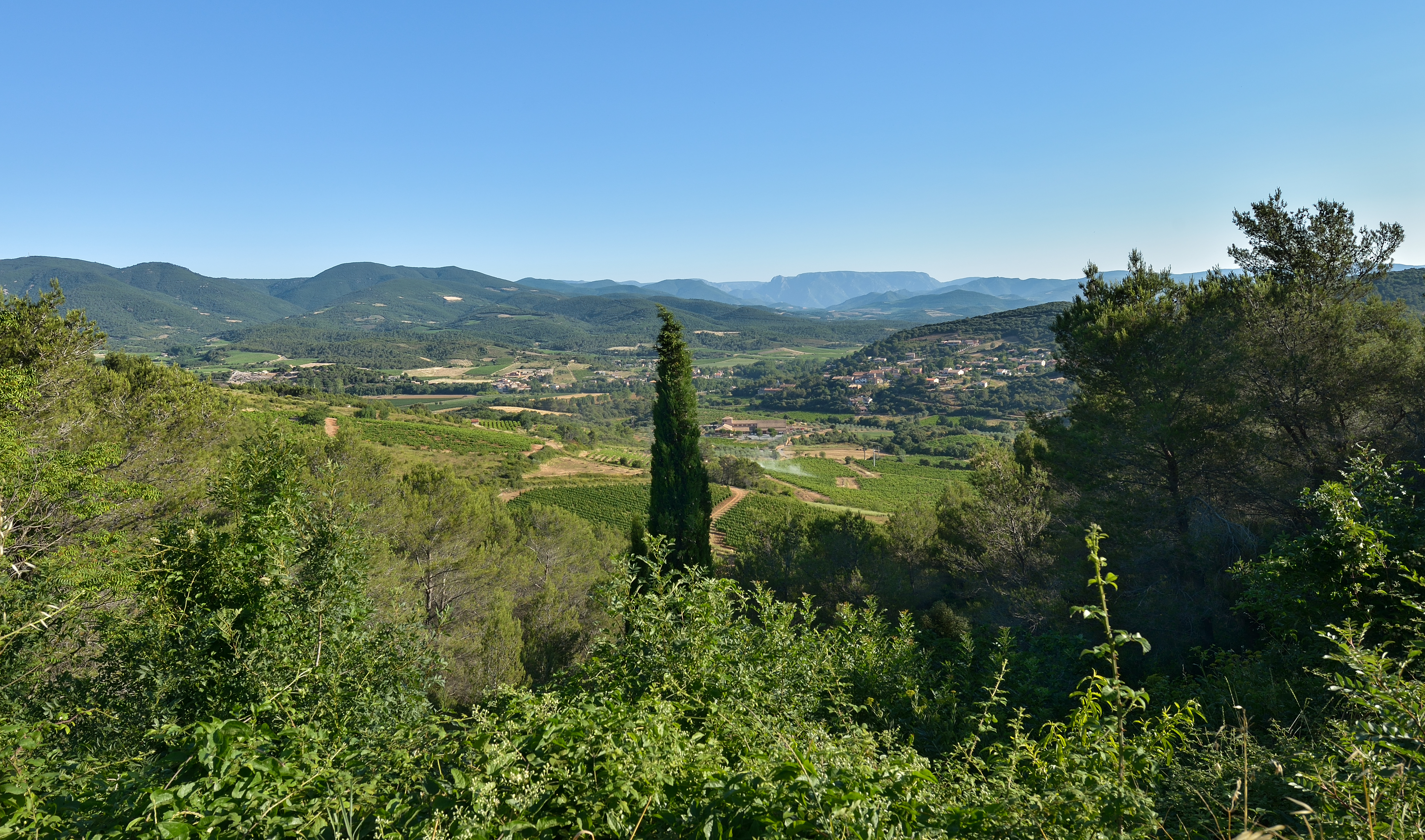
- A general view of Pierrerue

- Coat of arms
- Location of Pierrerue
- Location within France Location within Occitanie
- Coordinates: 43°25′42″N 2°58′42″E
- Country: France
- Region: Occitania
- Department: Hérault
- Arrondissement: Béziers
- Canton: Saint-Pons-de-Thomières

Government
  - Mayor (2023–2026): Jean-Pierre Guiraud
- Area^{1}: 11.7 km^{2} (4.5 sq mi)
- Elevation: 150 m (490 ft)
- Highest elevation: 683 m (2,241 ft)
- Lowest elevation: 90 m (300 ft)
- Population (2023): 289
  - Density: 24.7/km^{2} (64.0/sq mi)
- Time zone: UTC+01:00 (CET)
  - Summer (DST): UTC+02:00 (CEST)
- INSEE/Postal code: 34201 /34360
- ^{1} French Land Register data, which excludes lakes, ponds, glaciers > 1 km^{2} (0.386 sq mi or 247 acres) and river estuaries.

Pierrerue (French pronunciation: [pjɛʁ.ʁy]; Occitan: Pèirarua) is a commune in the Hérault department in the Occitanie region in southern France.

== Population ==
Historical population
Year	Pop.	±% p.a.
1968	257	—
1975	242	−0.86%
1982	280	+2.11%
1990	259	−0.97%
1999	264	+0.21%
2007	284	+0.92%
2012	291	+0.49%
2017	292	+0.07%
2023	289	−0.17%
Source: INSEE

== See also ==
- Communes of the Hérault department
