= Boisset, Hérault =

Boisset
- Commune
- Coat of arms
- Location of Boisset
- Location within France Location within Occitanie
- Coordinates: 43°24′09″N 2°42′18″E
- Country: France
- Region: Occitania
- Department: Hérault
- Arrondissement: Béziers
- Canton: Saint-Pons-de-Thomières

Government
  - Mayor (2020–2026): Benoît Marsaux
- Area^{1}: 17.47 km^{2} (6.75 sq mi)
- Elevation: 321 m (1,053 ft)
- Highest elevation: 794 m (2,605 ft)
- Lowest elevation: 257 m (843 ft)
- Population (2023): 43
  - Density: 2.5/km^{2} (6.4/sq mi)
- Time zone: UTC+01:00 (CET)
  - Summer (DST): UTC+02:00 (CEST)
- INSEE/Postal code: 34034 /34220
- ^{1} French Land Register data, which excludes lakes, ponds, glaciers > 1 km^{2} (0.386 sq mi or 247 acres) and river estuaries.

Boisset (French pronunciation: [bwasɛ]) is a commune in the Hérault department in the Occitanie region in southern France.

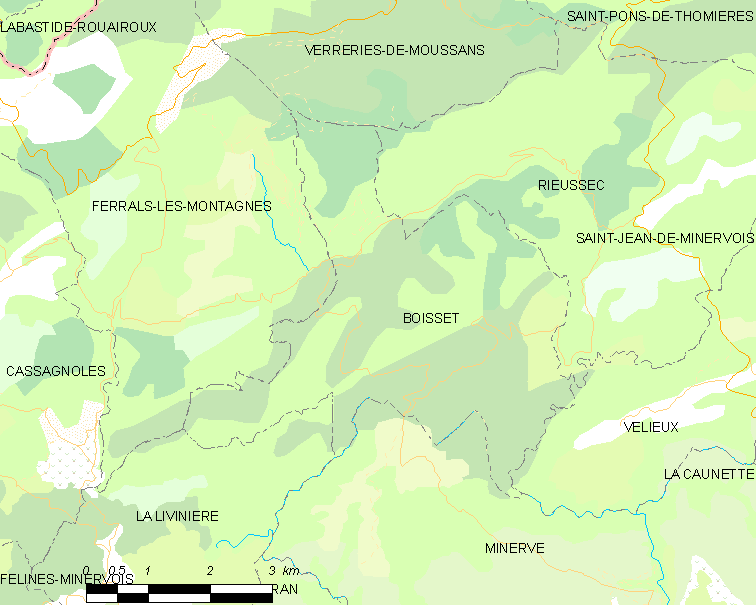
Map

== Population ==
Historical population
Year	Pop.	±% p.a.
1968	7	—
1975	8	+1.93%
1982	23	+16.28%
1990	22	−0.55%
1999	30	+3.51%
2007	27	−1.31%
2012	37	+6.50%
2017	40	+1.57%
2023	43	+1.21%
Source: INSEE

== See also ==
- Communes of the Hérault department
