= Saint-Jean-de-Minervois =

- Commune
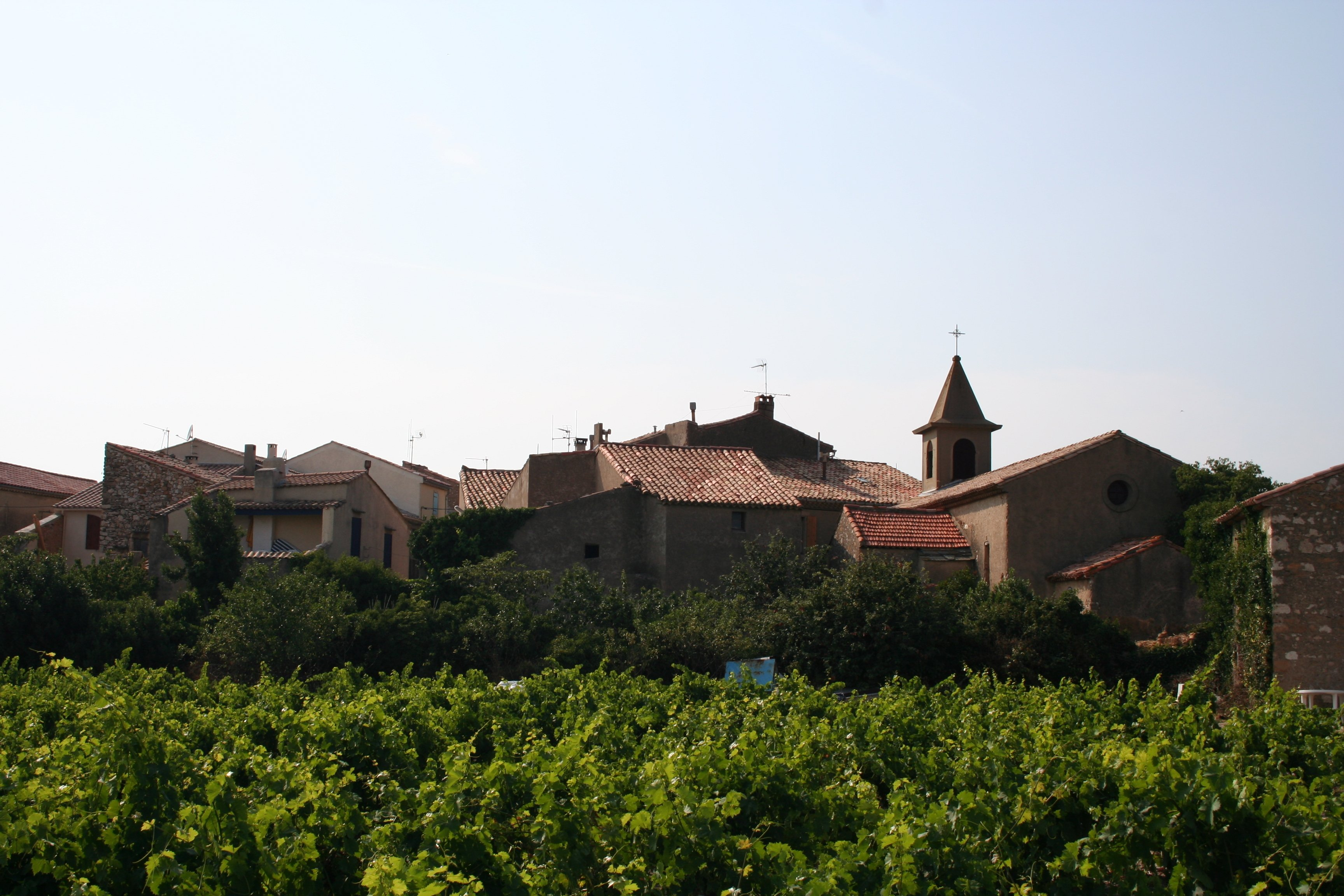
- A general view of Saint-Jean-de-Minervois

- Coat of arms
- Location of Saint-Jean-de-Minervois
- Location within France Location within Occitanie
- Coordinates: 43°23′14″N 2°50′00″E
- Country: France
- Region: Occitania
- Department: Hérault
- Arrondissement: Béziers
- Canton: Saint-Pons-de-Thomières

Government
  - Mayor (2021–2026): Sylvie Miquel
- Area^{1}: 32.7 km^{2} (12.6 sq mi)
- Elevation: 280 m (920 ft)
- Highest elevation: 778 m (2,552 ft)
- Lowest elevation: 159 m (522 ft)
- Population (2023): 131
  - Density: 4.01/km^{2} (10.4/sq mi)
- Time zone: UTC+01:00 (CET)
  - Summer (DST): UTC+02:00 (CEST)
- INSEE/Postal code: 34269 /34360
- ^{1} French Land Register data, which excludes lakes, ponds, glaciers > 1 km^{2} (0.386 sq mi or 247 acres) and river estuaries.

Saint-Jean-de-Minervois (Languedocien: Sant Joan de Menerbés) is a commune in the Hérault department in the Occitanie region in southern France.

When it was created in 1908, this commune's name was Saint-Jean-de-Pardailhan.

Its name was changed in 1936 to allow a better marketing of its famous muscat wine, the Muscat de Saint-Jean-de-Minervois, recognized since 1949.

== Population ==
Historical population
Year	Pop.	±% p.a.
1968	182	—
1975	151	−2.63%
1982	146	−0.48%
1990	135	−0.97%
1999	115	−1.77%
2007	137	+2.21%
2012	146	+1.28%
2017	148	+0.27%
2023	131	−2.01%
Source: INSEE

== See also ==
- Communes of the Hérault department
