= Babeau-Bouldoux =

- Commune
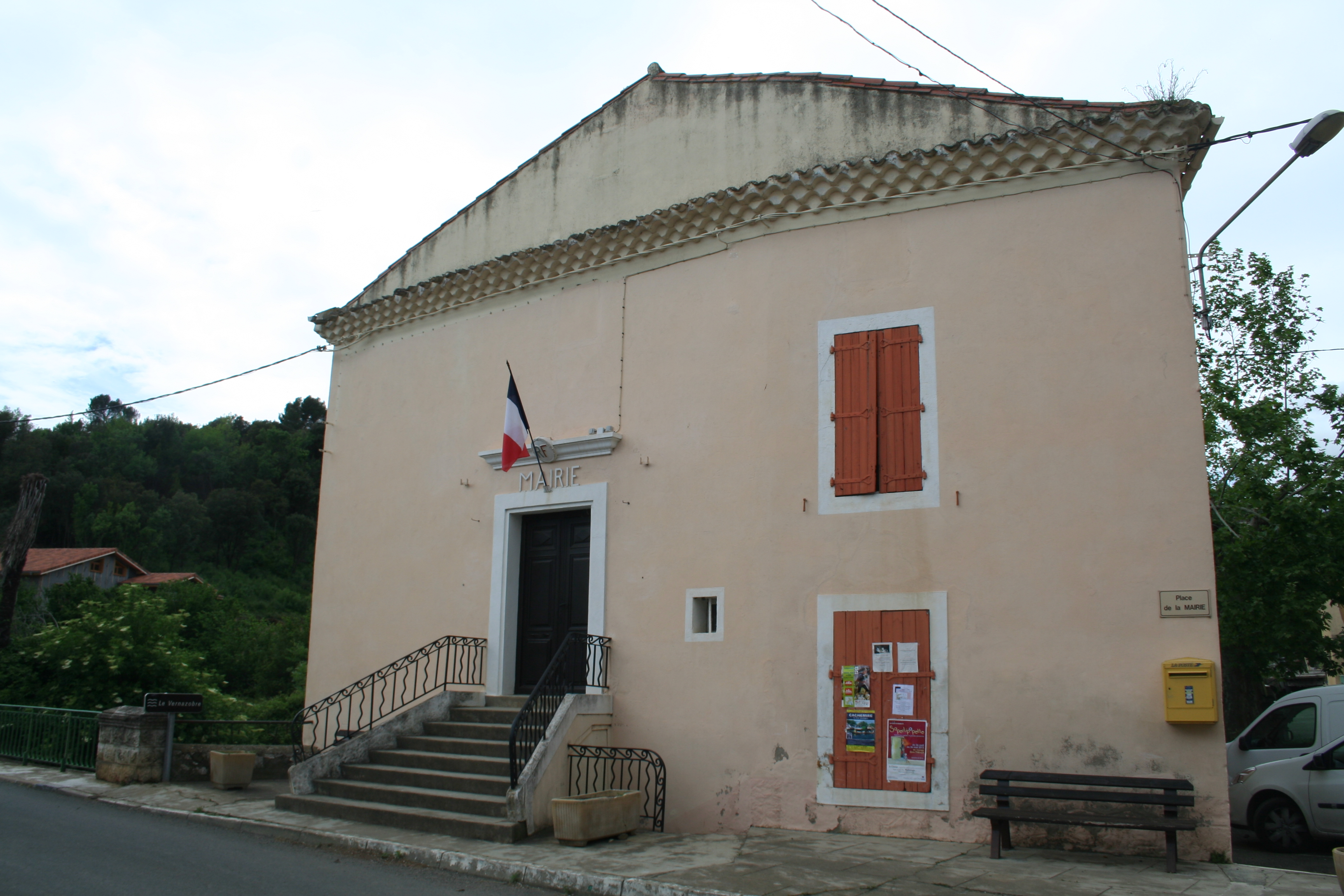
- The town hall in Babeau-Bouldoux

- Coat of arms
- Location of Babeau-Bouldoux
- Location within France Location within Occitanie
- Coordinates: 43°26′13″N 2°54′36″E
- Country: France
- Region: Occitania
- Department: Hérault
- Arrondissement: Béziers
- Canton: Saint-Pons-de-Thomières
- Intercommunality: Sud-Hérault

Government
  - Mayor (2020–2026): Jérôme Roger
- Area^{1}: 21.4 km^{2} (8.3 sq mi)
- Elevation: 200 m (660 ft)
- Highest elevation: 681 m (2,234 ft)
- Lowest elevation: 153 m (502 ft)
- Population (2023): 309
  - Density: 14.4/km^{2} (37.4/sq mi)
- Time zone: UTC+01:00 (CET)
  - Summer (DST): UTC+02:00 (CEST)
- INSEE/Postal code: 34021 /34360
- ^{1} French Land Register data, which excludes lakes, ponds, glaciers > 1 km^{2} (0.386 sq mi or 247 acres) and river estuaries.

Babeau-Bouldoux (Babau e Boldors in Occitan) is a commune in the Hérault department in the Occitanie region in southern France.

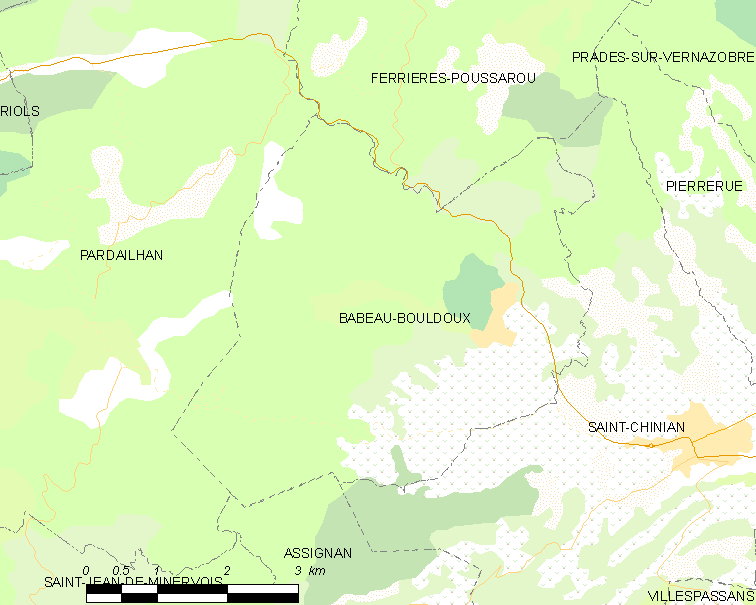
Map

== Population ==
Historical population
Year	Pop.	±% p.a.
1968	321	—
1975	242	−3.96%
1982	249	+0.41%
1990	249	+0.00%
1999	243	−0.27%
2007	291	+2.28%
2012	290	−0.07%
2017	296	+0.41%
2023	309	+0.72%
Source: INSEE

== See also ==
- Communes of the Hérault department
