= Cessenon-sur-Orb =

- Commune
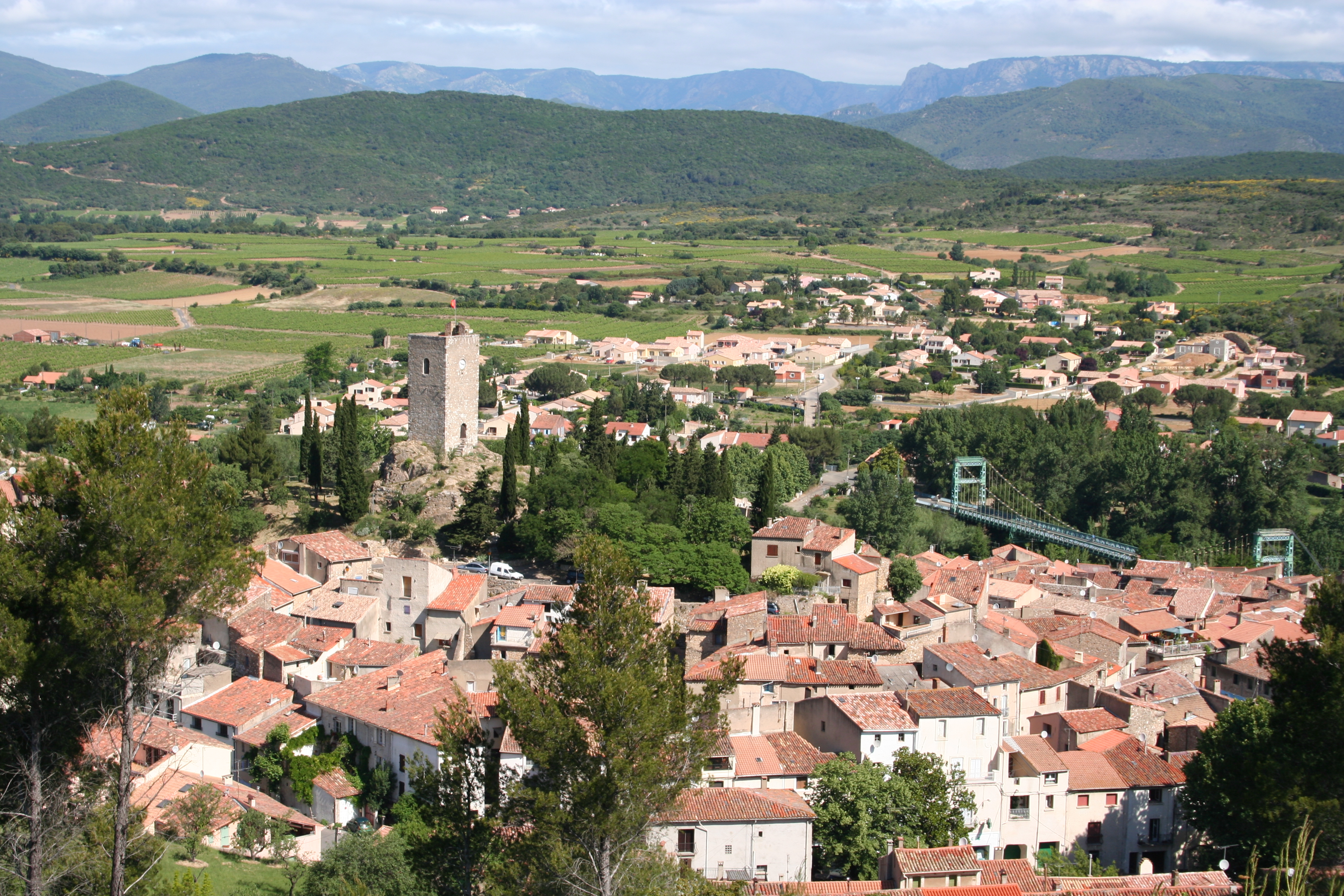
- A general view of Cessenon-sur-Orb

- Coat of arms
- Location of Cessenon-sur-Orb
- Location within France Location within Occitanie
- Coordinates: 43°27′03″N 3°03′07″E
- Country: France
- Region: Occitania
- Department: Hérault
- Arrondissement: Béziers
- Canton: Saint-Pons-de-Thomières

Government
  - Mayor (2020–2026): Marie-Pierre Pons
- Area^{1}: 37.29 km^{2} (14.40 sq mi)
- Elevation: 52 m (171 ft)
- Highest elevation: 254 m (833 ft)
- Lowest elevation: 29 m (95 ft)
- Population (2023): 2,410
  - Density: 64.6/km^{2} (167/sq mi)
- Time zone: UTC+01:00 (CET)
  - Summer (DST): UTC+02:00 (CEST)
- INSEE/Postal code: 34074 /34460
- ^{1} French Land Register data, which excludes lakes, ponds, glaciers > 1 km^{2} (0.386 sq mi or 247 acres) and river estuaries.

Cessenon-sur-Orb (French pronunciation: [sɛsnɔ̃ syʁ ɔʁb], literally Cessenon on Orb; Occitan: Cecenon, before 1985: Cessenon) is a commune in the Hérault department in southern France.

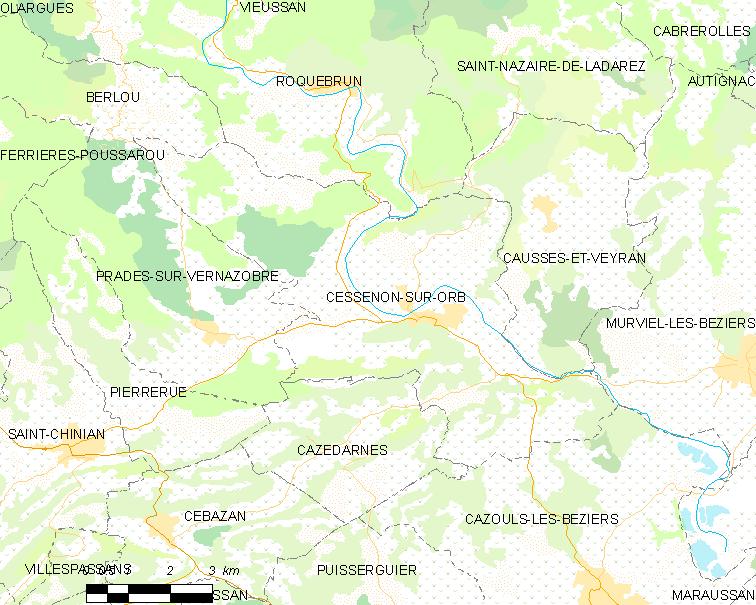
Map

== Population ==
Historical population
Year	Pop.	±% p.a.
1968	2,025	—
1975	1,736	−2.18%
1982	1,680	−0.47%
1990	1,602	−0.59%
1999	1,730	+0.86%
2007	1,968	+1.62%
2012	2,123	+1.53%
2017	2,284	+1.47%
2023	2,410	+0.90%
Source: INSEE

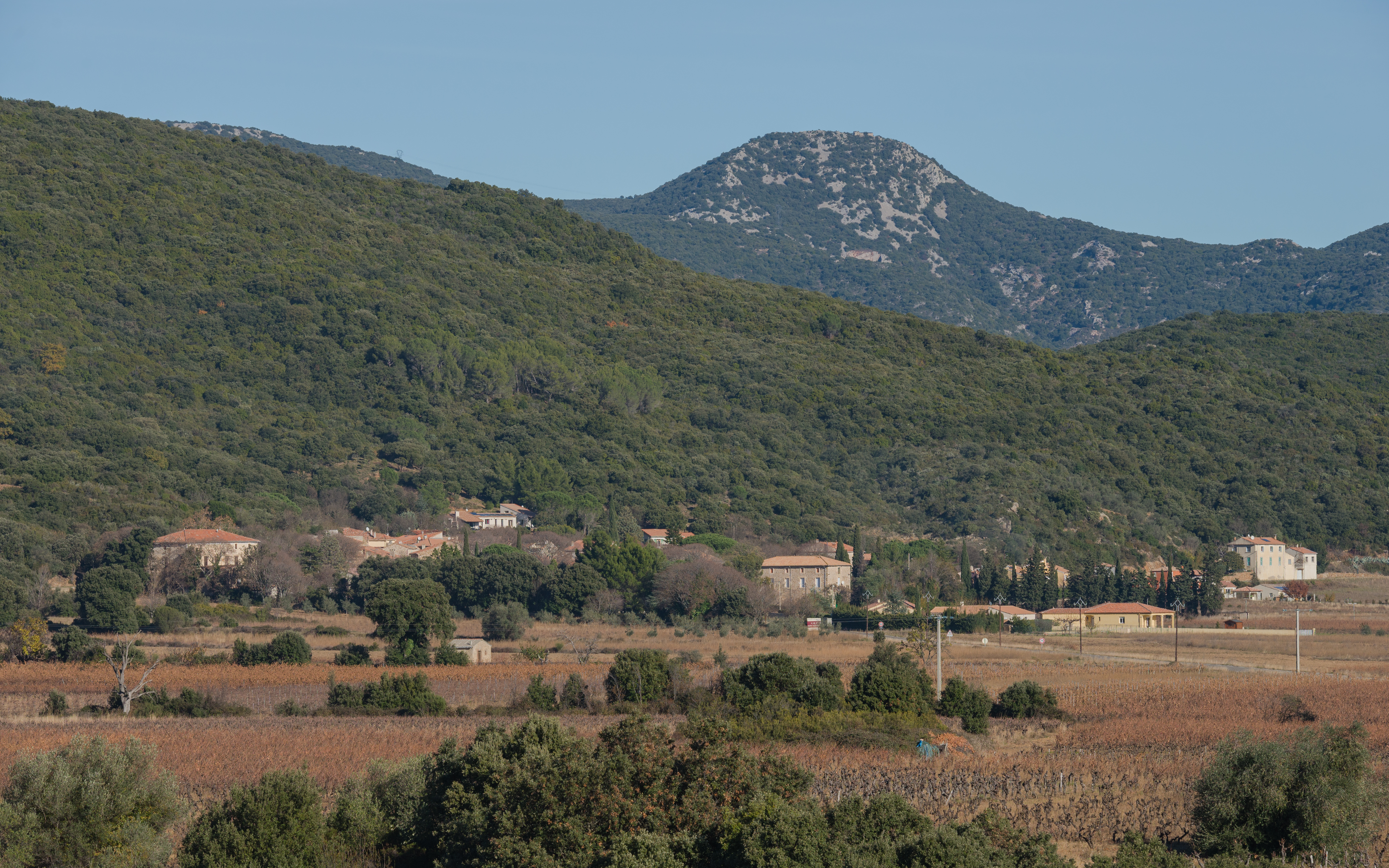
Hamlet of Lugné.

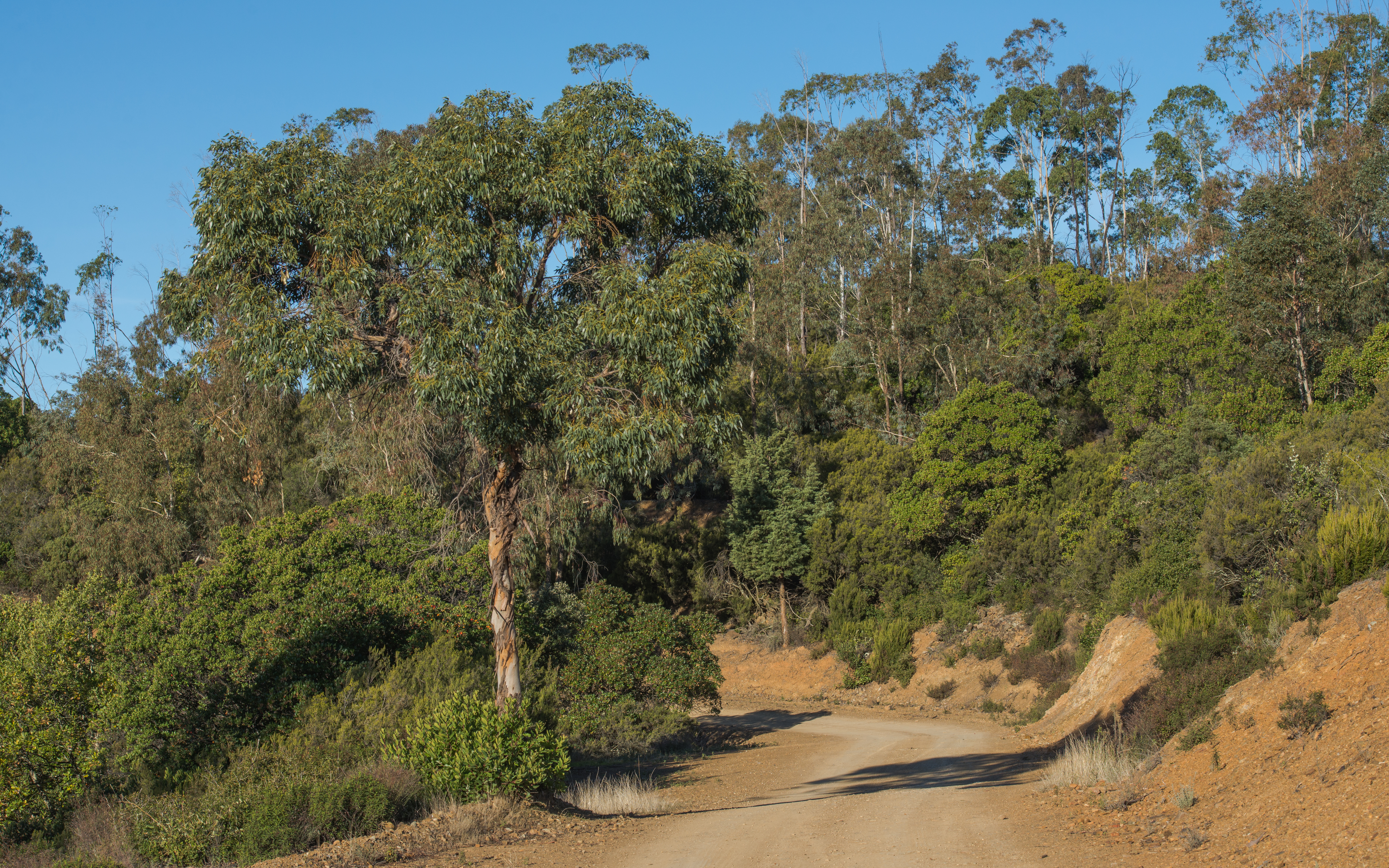
The Eucalyptus forest.

== See also ==
- Communes of the Hérault department
