= Ferrals-les-Montagnes =

- Commune
- Coat of arms
- Location of Ferrals-les-Montagnes
- Location within France Location within Occitanie
- Coordinates: 43°24′11″N 2°37′55″E
- Country: France
- Region: Occitania
- Department: Hérault
- Arrondissement: Béziers
- Canton: Saint-Pons-de-Thomières

Government
  - Mayor (2023–2026): Vincent Naudin
- Area^{1}: 25.78 km^{2} (9.95 sq mi)
- Elevation: 400 m (1,300 ft)
- Highest elevation: 887 m (2,910 ft)
- Lowest elevation: 358 m (1,175 ft)
- Population (2023): 156
  - Density: 6.05/km^{2} (15.7/sq mi)
- Demonym: Ferralais
- Time zone: UTC+01:00 (CET)
  - Summer (DST): UTC+02:00 (CEST)
- INSEE/Postal code: 34098 /34210
- ^{1} French Land Register data, which excludes lakes, ponds, glaciers > 1 km^{2} (0.386 sq mi or 247 acres) and river estuaries.

Ferrals-les-Montagnes (French pronunciation: [fɛʁal le mɔ̃taɲ]; Occitan: Ferrals de las Montanhas) is a commune in the Hérault department in southern France.

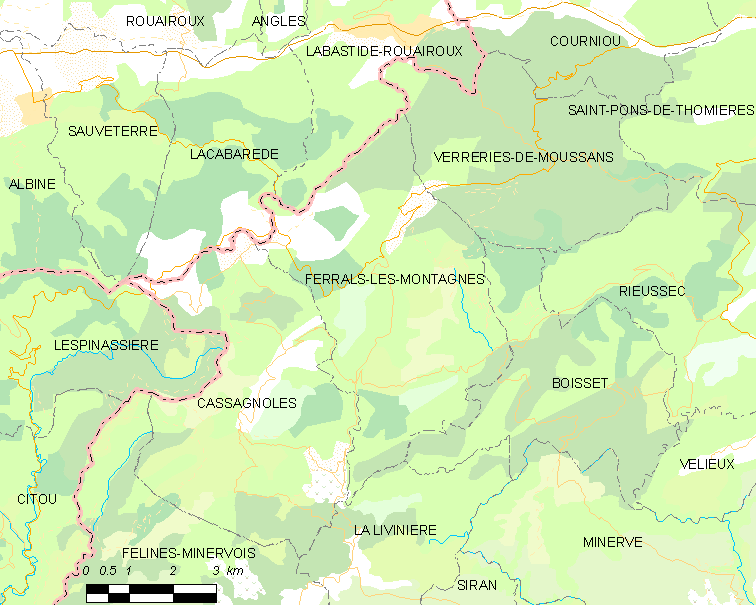
Map

== Population ==
Historical population
Year	Pop.	±% p.a.
1968	135	—
1975	117	−2.02%
1982	143	+2.91%
1990	112	−3.01%
1999	140	+2.51%
2007	158	+1.52%
2012	149	−1.17%
2017	170	+2.67%
2023	156	−1.42%
Source: INSEE

== See also ==
- Communes of the Hérault department
