= Pardailhan =

- Commune
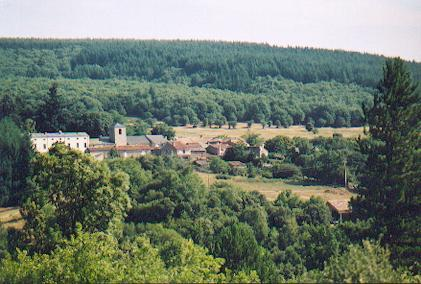
- The hamlet of Pardailhan

- Coat of arms
- Location of Pardailhan
- Location within France Location within Occitanie
- Coordinates: 43°27′06″N 2°50′50″E
- Country: France
- Region: Occitania
- Department: Hérault
- Arrondissement: Béziers
- Canton: Saint-Pons-de-Thomières

Government
  - Mayor (2020–2026): Alain Tailhan
- Area^{1}: 41.18 km^{2} (15.90 sq mi)
- Elevation: 473 m (1,552 ft)
- Highest elevation: 820 m (2,690 ft)
- Lowest elevation: 275 m (902 ft)
- Population (2023): 193
  - Density: 4.69/km^{2} (12.1/sq mi)
- Time zone: UTC+01:00 (CET)
  - Summer (DST): UTC+02:00 (CEST)
- INSEE/Postal code: 34193 /34360
- ^{1} French Land Register data, which excludes lakes, ponds, glaciers > 1 km^{2} (0.386 sq mi or 247 acres) and river estuaries.

Pardailhan (French pronunciation: [paʁdajɑ̃]; Occitan: Pardalhan) is a commune in the Hérault department in the Occitanie region in southern France.

== Population ==
Historical population
Year	Pop.	±% p.a.
1968	93	—
1975	83	−1.61%
1982	102	+2.99%
1990	126	+2.68%
1999	164	+2.97%
2007	177	+0.96%
2012	186	+1.00%
2017	183	−0.32%
2023	193	+0.89%
Source: INSEE

== See also ==
- Communes of the Hérault department
