= Cesseras =

French commune

- Commune
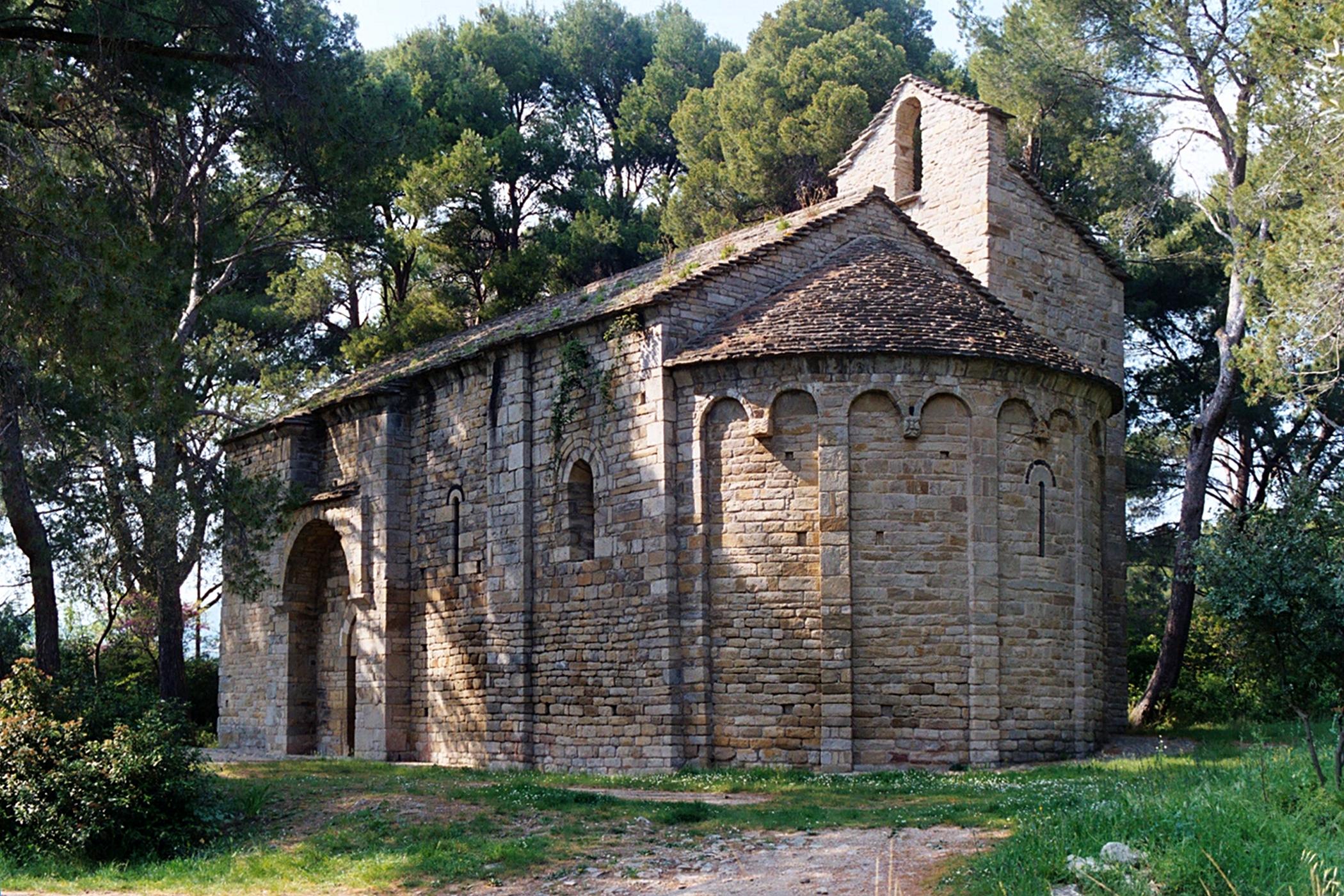
- Chapel

- Coat of arms
- Location of Cesseras
- Location within France Location within Occitanie
- Coordinates: 43°19′33″N 2°42′57″E
- Country: France
- Region: Occitania
- Department: Hérault
- Arrondissement: Béziers
- Canton: Saint-Pons-de-Thomières

Government
  - Mayor (2020–2026): Magali Guiraud
- Area^{1}: 15.07 km^{2} (5.82 sq mi)
- Elevation: 85 m (279 ft)
- Highest elevation: 417 m (1,368 ft)
- Lowest elevation: 54 m (177 ft)
- Population (2023): 435
  - Density: 28.9/km^{2} (74.8/sq mi)
- Time zone: UTC+01:00 (CET)
  - Summer (DST): UTC+02:00 (CEST)
- INSEE/Postal code: 34075 /34210
- ^{1} French Land Register data, which excludes lakes, ponds, glaciers > 1 km^{2} (0.386 sq mi or 247 acres) and river estuaries.

Cesseras is a commune in the Hérault department in southern France.

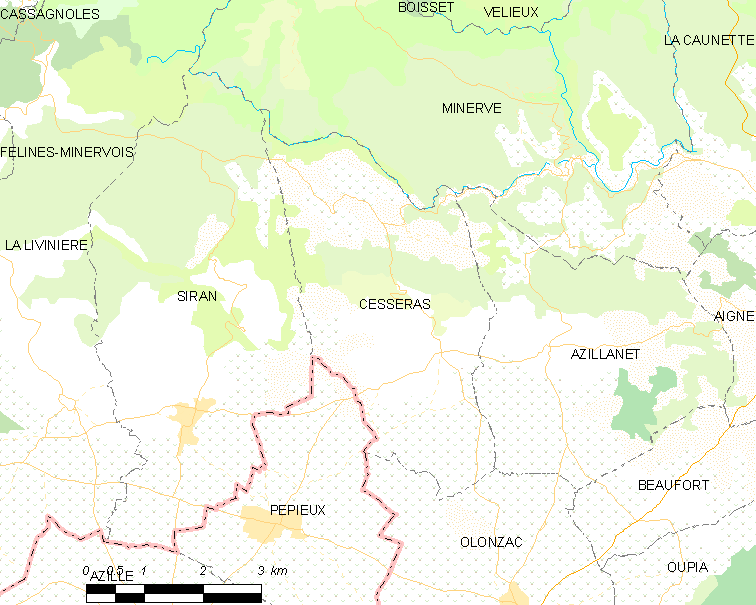
Map

== Population ==
Historical population
Year	Pop.	±% p.a.
1968	442	—
1975	433	−0.29%
1982	388	−1.56%
1990	382	−0.19%
1999	400	+0.51%
2007	431	+0.94%
2012	359	−3.59%
2017	392	+1.77%
2023	435	+1.75%
Source: INSEE

== See also ==
- Communes of the Hérault department
