= Courniou =

- Commune
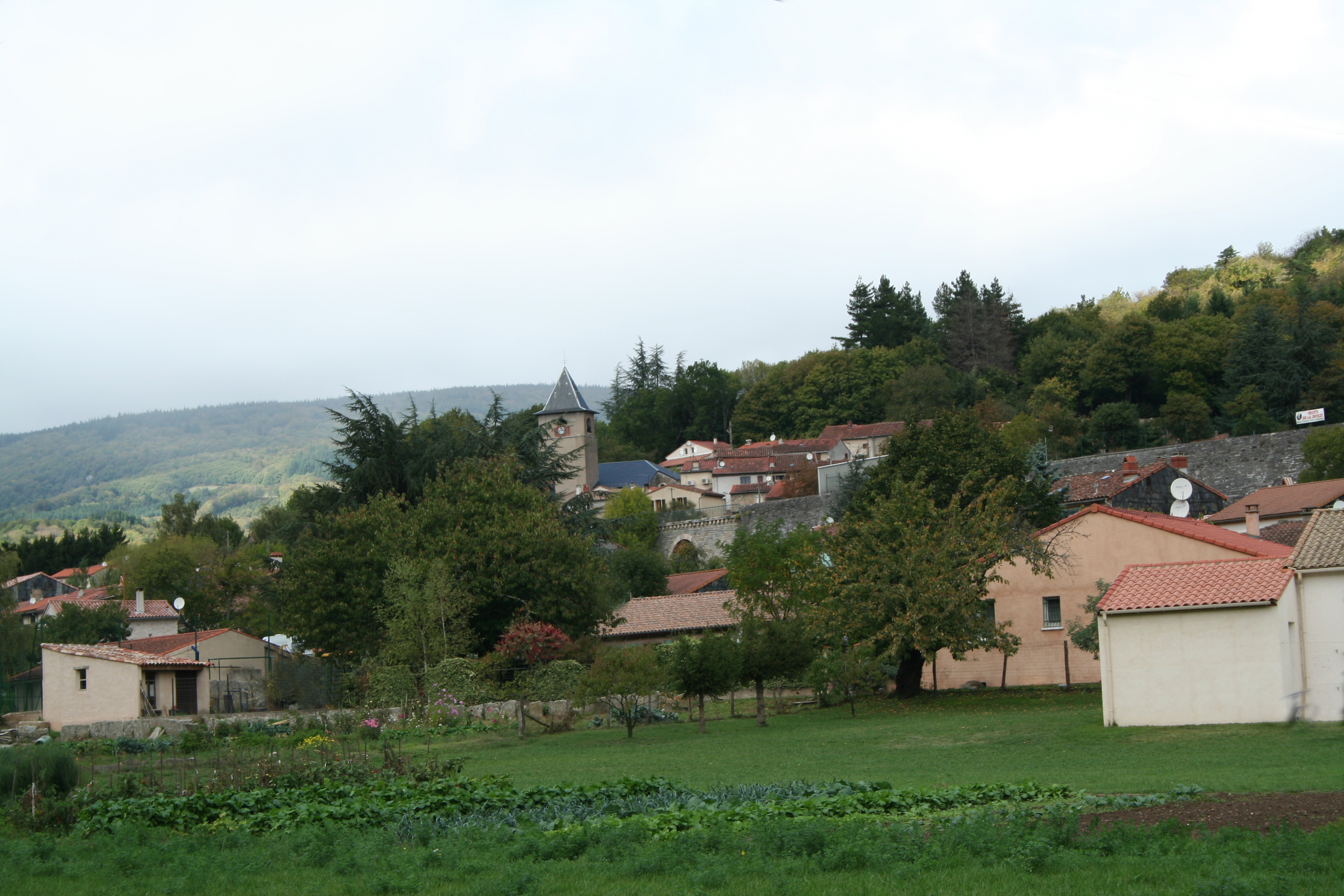
- View

- Coat of arms
- Location of Courniou
- Location within France Location within Occitanie
- Coordinates: 43°28′28″N 2°42′45″E
- Country: France
- Region: Occitania
- Department: Hérault
- Arrondissement: Béziers
- Canton: Saint-Pons-de-Thomières

Government
  - Mayor (2020–2026): Catherine Sonzogni
- Area^{1}: 30.06 km^{2} (11.61 sq mi)
- Elevation: 362 m (1,188 ft)
- Highest elevation: 951 m (3,120 ft)
- Lowest elevation: 329 m (1,079 ft)
- Population (2023): 610
  - Density: 20/km^{2} (53/sq mi)
- Time zone: UTC+01:00 (CET)
  - Summer (DST): UTC+02:00 (CEST)
- INSEE/Postal code: 34086 /34220
- ^{1} French Land Register data, which excludes lakes, ponds, glaciers > 1 km^{2} (0.386 sq mi or 247 acres) and river estuaries.

Courniou (French pronunciation: [kuʁnju]; Occitan: Cornhon) is a commune in the Hérault department in southern France.

== Geography ==
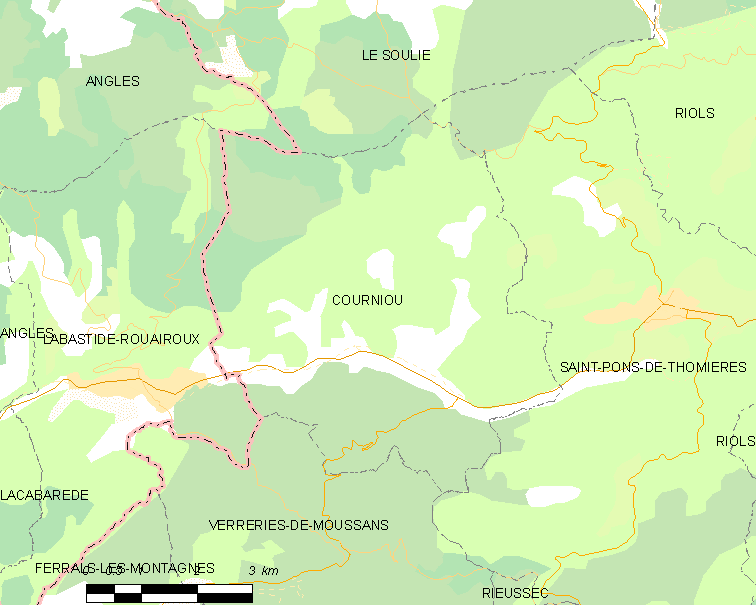
Map

=== Climate ===
Courniou has a warm-summer mediterranean climate (Köppen climate classification Csb). The average annual temperature in Courniou is 11.9 °C (53.4 °F). The average annual rainfall is 1,444.7 mm (56.88 in) with December as the wettest month. The temperatures are highest on average in July, at around 20.2 °C (68.4 °F), and lowest in January, at around 4.8 °C (40.6 °F). The highest temperature ever recorded in Courniou was 39.3 °C (102.7 °F) on 12 August 2003; the coldest temperature ever recorded was −15.5 °C (4.1 °F) on 16 January 1985.

Climate data for Courniou (1981–2010 averages, extremes 1971−2014)
Month	Jan	Feb	Mar	Apr	May	Jun	Jul	Aug	Sep	Oct	Nov	Dec	Year
Record high °C (°F)	19.9 (67.8)	23.0 (73.4)	26.5 (79.7)	28.2 (82.8)	31.8 (89.2)	36.0 (96.8)	35.9 (96.6)	39.3 (102.7)	33.0 (91.4)	29.1 (84.4)	24.5 (76.1)	22.0 (71.6)	39.3 (102.7)
Mean daily maximum °C (°F)	8.0 (46.4)	8.8 (47.8)	11.9 (53.4)	14.3 (57.7)	18.5 (65.3)	22.6 (72.7)	25.8 (78.4)	25.6 (78.1)	21.7 (71.1)	16.8 (62.2)	11.4 (52.5)	8.6 (47.5)	16.2 (61.2)
Daily mean °C (°F)	4.8 (40.6)	5.3 (41.5)	7.8 (46.0)	9.9 (49.8)	13.7 (56.7)	17.4 (63.3)	20.2 (68.4)	20.0 (68.0)	16.6 (61.9)	12.9 (55.2)	8.1 (46.6)	5.5 (41.9)	11.9 (53.4)
Mean daily minimum °C (°F)	1.7 (35.1)	1.8 (35.2)	3.7 (38.7)	5.6 (42.1)	8.9 (48.0)	12.1 (53.8)	14.5 (58.1)	14.4 (57.9)	11.5 (52.7)	9.1 (48.4)	4.9 (40.8)	2.3 (36.1)	7.6 (45.7)
Record low °C (°F)	−15.5 (4.1)	−11.7 (10.9)	−12.5 (9.5)	−2.5 (27.5)	−1.2 (29.8)	3.5 (38.3)	5.5 (41.9)	5.0 (41.0)	−0.3 (31.5)	−2.0 (28.4)	−8.2 (17.2)	−10.5 (13.1)	−15.5 (4.1)
Average precipitation mm (inches)	161.0 (6.34)	148.5 (5.85)	117.9 (4.64)	151.6 (5.97)	102.6 (4.04)	58.0 (2.28)	35.4 (1.39)	60.5 (2.38)	92.6 (3.65)	162.8 (6.41)	174.5 (6.87)	179.3 (7.06)	1,444.7 (56.88)
Average precipitation days (≥ 1.0 mm)	13.6	12.4	12.0	12.4	10.0	7.0	5.1	6.5	7.8	11.9	12.7	12.7	124.0
Source: Meteociel

== Population ==
Historical population
Year	Pop.	±% p.a.
1968	529	—
1975	503	−0.72%
1982	537	+0.94%
1990	595	+1.29%
1999	606	+0.20%
2007	626	+0.41%
2012	612	−0.45%
2017	609	−0.10%
2023	610	+0.03%
Source: INSEE

== See also ==
- Communes of the Hérault department
