= Mons, Hérault =

Mons
- Commune
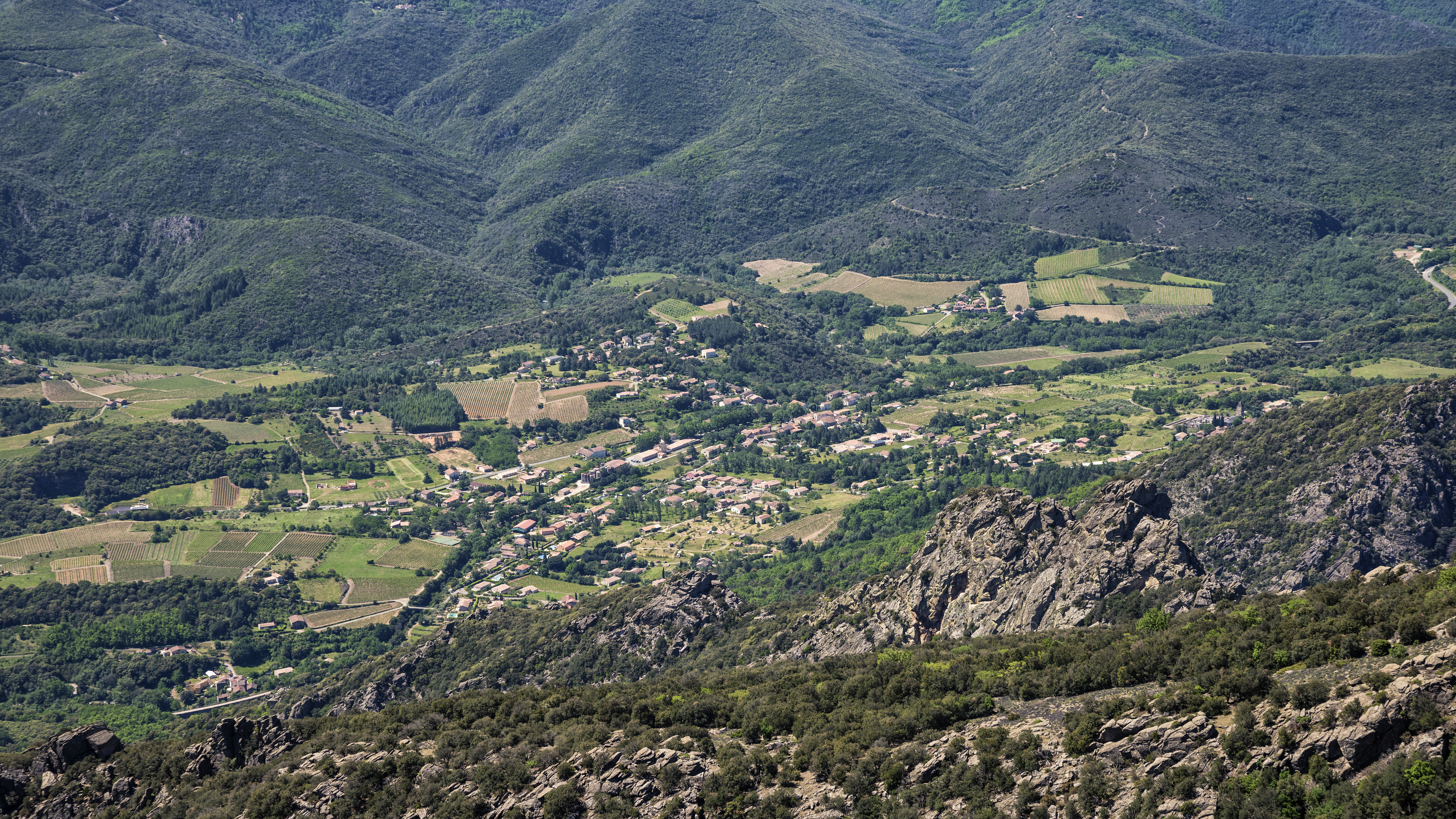
- Vue générale

- Coat of arms
- Location of Mons
- Location within France Location within Occitanie
- Coordinates: 43°34′20″N 2°57′22″E
- Country: France
- Region: Occitania
- Department: Hérault
- Arrondissement: Béziers
- Canton: Saint-Pons-de-Thomières

Government
  - Mayor (2020–2026): Arielle Escuret
- Area^{1}: 22.32 km^{2} (8.62 sq mi)
- Elevation: 248 m (814 ft)
- Highest elevation: 1,054 m (3,458 ft)
- Lowest elevation: 117 m (384 ft)
- Population (2023): 678
  - Density: 30.4/km^{2} (78.7/sq mi)
- Time zone: UTC+01:00 (CET)
  - Summer (DST): UTC+02:00 (CEST)
- INSEE/Postal code: 34160 /34390
- ^{1} French Land Register data, which excludes lakes, ponds, glaciers > 1 km^{2} (0.386 sq mi or 247 acres) and river estuaries.

Mons (French pronunciation: [mɔ̃s]; Occitan: Mònts) is a commune in the Hérault department in Occitanie in southern France.

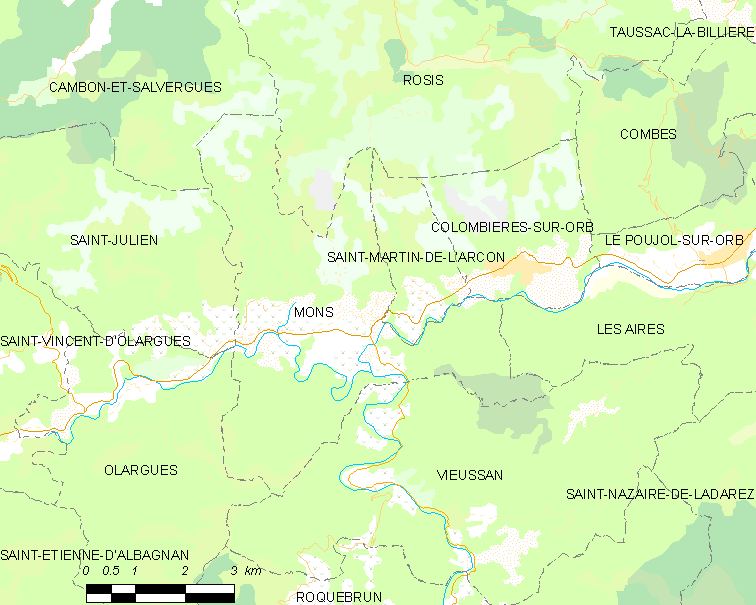
Map

== Population ==
Historical population
Year	Pop.	±% p.a.
1968	440	—
1975	455	+0.48%
1982	514	+1.76%
1990	519	+0.12%
1999	507	−0.26%
2007	555	+1.14%
2012	583	+0.99%
2017	584	+0.03%
2023	678	+2.52%
Source: INSEE

== See also ==
- Communes of the Hérault department
