= Canton of Saint-Pons-de-Thomières =

Coordinates: 43°26′27″N 2°45′25″E

Saint-Pons-de-Thomières
- Canton
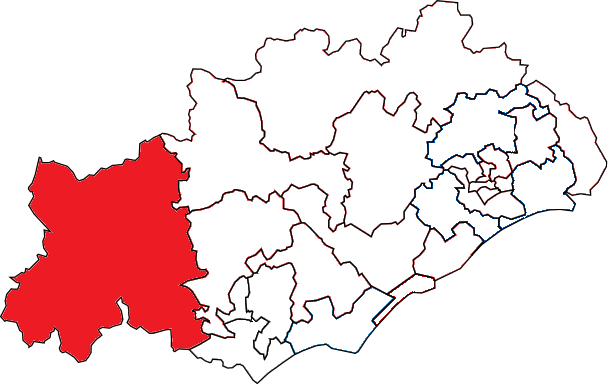
- Interactive map of Saint-Pons-de-Thomières
- Country: France
- Region: Occitania
- Department: Hérault
- No. of communes: {{{nbcomm}}}

Government
  - Representatives (2021–2028): Kléber Mesquida; Marie-Pierre Pons
- Area: 1,416.17 km^{2} (546.79 sq mi)
- Population (2023): 35,231
  - Density: 24.878/km^{2} (64.433/sq mi)
- INSEE code: 34 24

The canton of Saint-Pons-de-Thomières is an administrative division of the Hérault department, southern France. Its borders were modified at the French canton reorganisation which came into effect in March 2015. Its seat is in Saint-Pons-de-Thomières.

== Composition ==
It consists of the following communes:

- Agel
- Aigne
- Aigues-Vives
- Assignan
- Azillanet
- Babeau-Bouldoux
- Beaufort
- Berlou
- Boisset
- Cambon-et-Salvergues
- Capestang
- Cassagnoles
- Castanet-le-Haut
- La Caunette
- Cazedarnes
- Cébazan
- Cessenon-sur-Orb
- Cesseras
- Colombières-sur-Orb
- Courniou
- Creissan
- Cruzy
- Félines-Minervois
- Ferrals-les-Montagnes
- Ferrières-Poussarou
- Fraisse-sur-Agout
- La Livinière
- Minerve
- Mons
- Montels
- Montouliers
- Olargues
- Olonzac
- Oupia
- Pardailhan
- Pierrerue
- Poilhes
- Prades-sur-Vernazobre
- Prémian
- Puisserguier
- Quarante
- Rieussec
- Riols
- Roquebrun
- Rosis
- Saint-Chinian
- Saint-Étienne-d'Albagnan
- Saint-Jean-de-Minervois
- Saint-Julien
- Saint-Martin-de-l'Arçon
- Saint-Pons-de-Thomières
- Saint-Vincent-d'Olargues
- La Salvetat-sur-Agout
- Siran
- Le Soulié
- Vélieux
- Verreries-de-Moussans
- Vieussan
- Villespassans

== Councillors ==
Election	Councillors	Party	Occupation
2015	Kléber Mesquida	PS	President of the Departmental council of Hérault
2015	Marie Pierre Pons	PS	Mayor of Cessenon-sur-Orb
2021	Kléber Mesquida	PS	President of the Departmental council of Hérault
2021	Marie Pierre Pons	PS	Mayor of Cessenon-sur-Orb

== Gallery ==
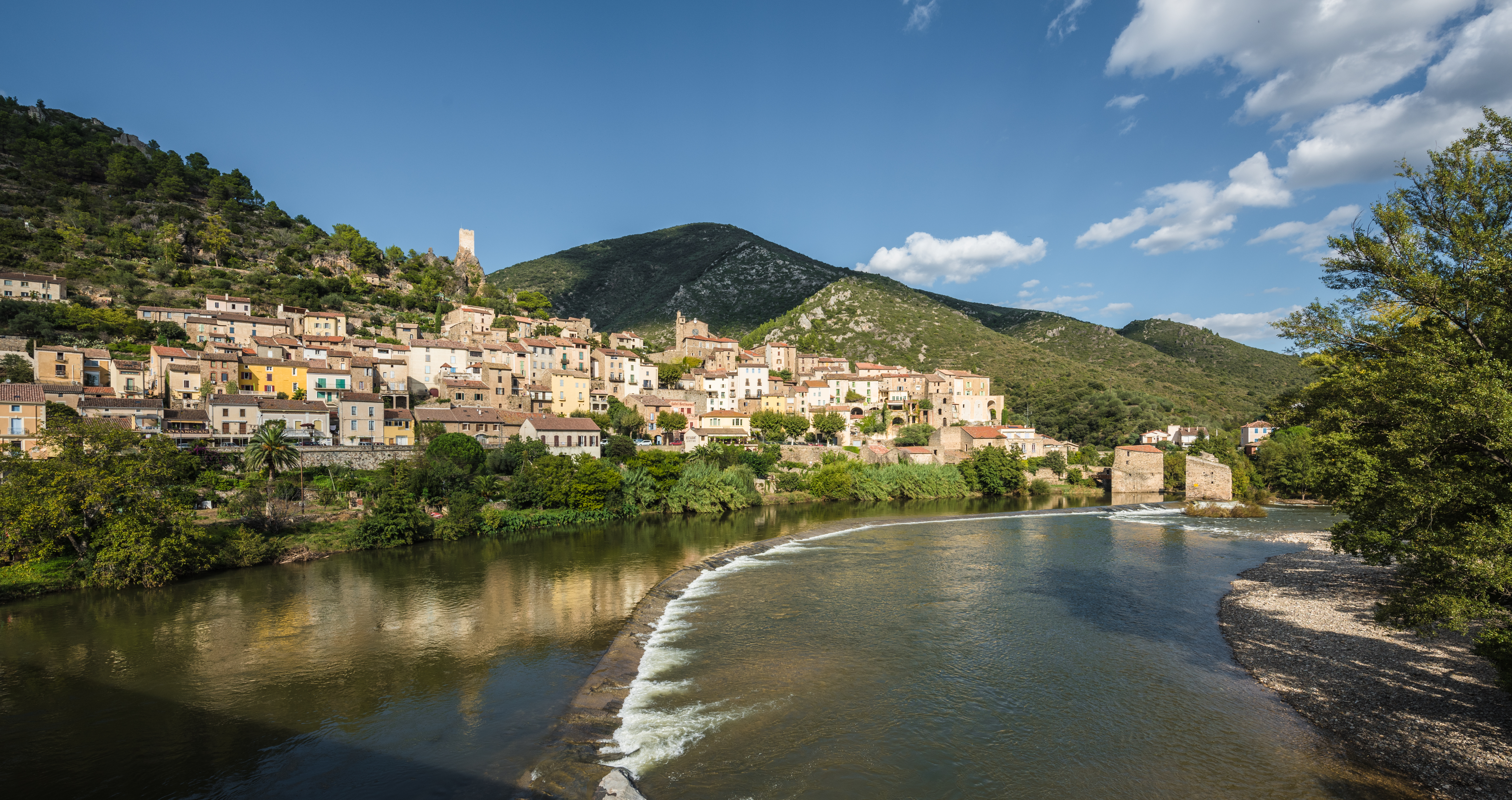
View of Roquebrun

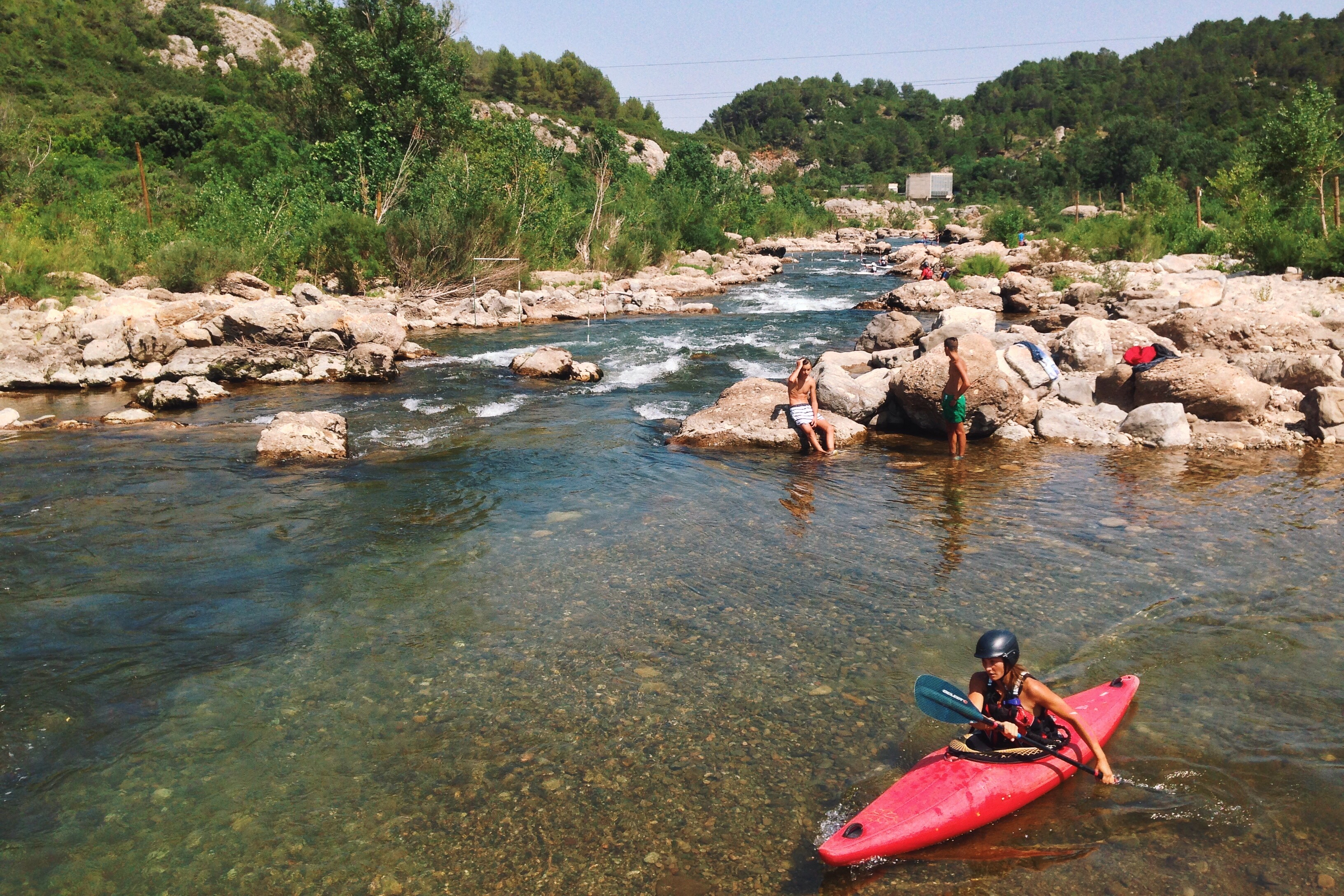
Orb River in Cessenon-sur-Orb

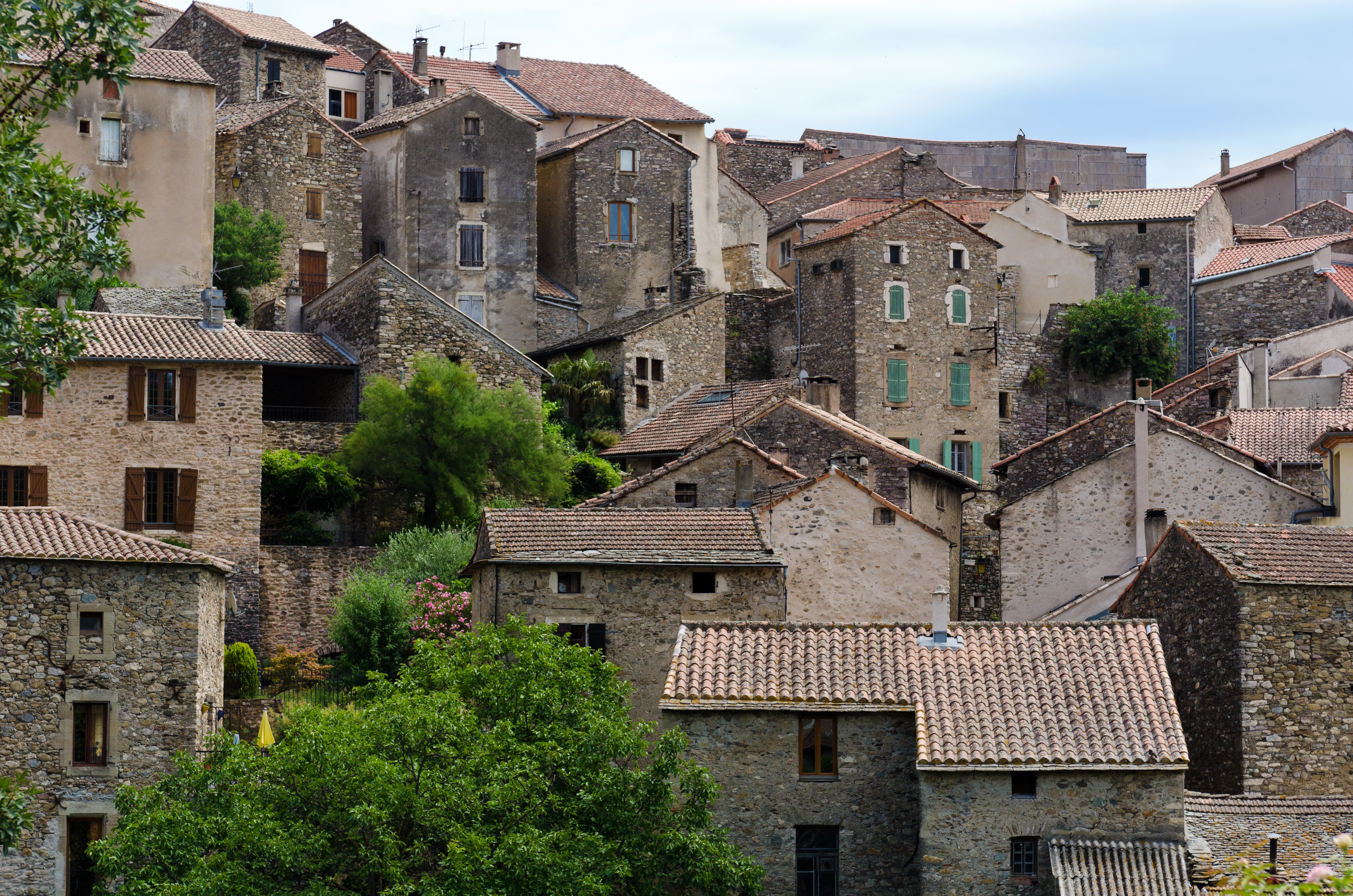
Olargues houses
