= Saint-Vincent-d'Olargues =

- Commune
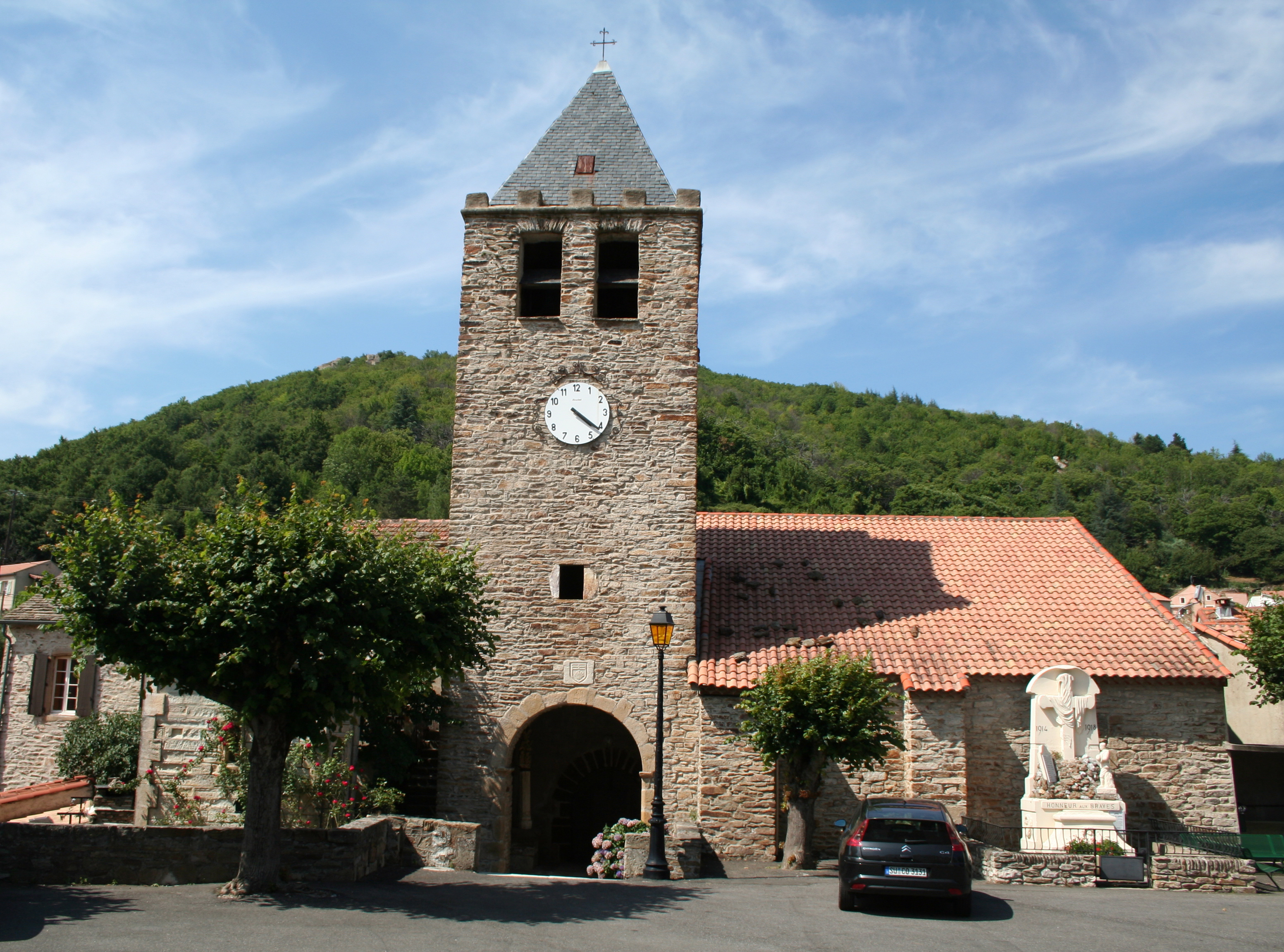
- The church of Saint-Vincent-d'Olargues

- Coat of arms
- Location of Saint-Vincent-d'Olargues
- Location within France Location within Occitanie
- Coordinates: 43°33′41″N 2°52′48″E
- Country: France
- Region: Occitania
- Department: Hérault
- Arrondissement: Béziers
- Canton: Saint-Pons-de-Thomières

Government
  - Mayor (2020–2026): Bernard Fontes
- Area^{1}: 15.84 km^{2} (6.12 sq mi)
- Elevation: 280 m (920 ft)
- Highest elevation: 1,085 m (3,560 ft)
- Lowest elevation: 180 m (590 ft)
- Population (2023): 355
  - Density: 22.4/km^{2} (58.0/sq mi)
- Time zone: UTC+01:00 (CET)
  - Summer (DST): UTC+02:00 (CEST)
- INSEE/Postal code: 34291 /34390
- ^{1} French Land Register data, which excludes lakes, ponds, glaciers > 1 km^{2} (0.386 sq mi or 247 acres) and river estuaries.

Saint-Vincent-d'Olargues (French pronunciation: [sɛ̃ vɛ̃sɑ̃ dɔlaʁɡ], literally Saint-Vincent of Olargues; Occitan: Sant Vincenç d'Olargues) is a commune in the Hérault department in the Occitanie region in southern France.

== Population ==
Historical population
Year	Pop.	±% p.a.
1968	372	—
1975	340	−1.28%
1982	335	−0.21%
1990	301	−1.33%
1999	323	+0.79%
2007	325	+0.08%
2012	317	−0.50%
2017	357	+2.41%
2023	355	−0.09%
Source: INSEE

== See also ==
- Communes of the Hérault department
