= Fraisse-sur-Agout =

- Commune
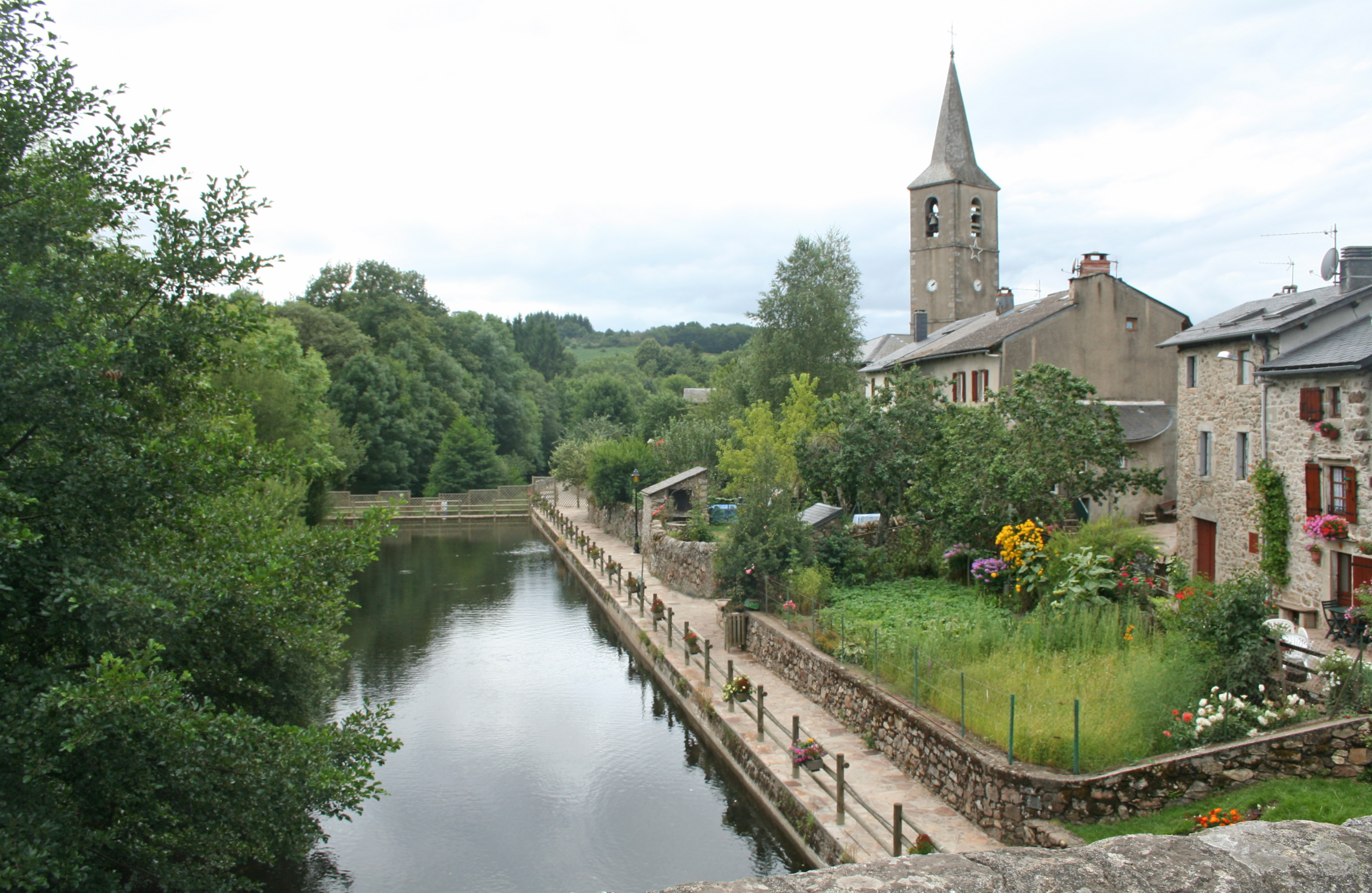
- The Agout, the village and the bell tower of Saint-Jean-Baptiste

- Coat of arms
- Location of Fraisse-sur-Agout
- Location within France Location within Occitanie
- Coordinates: 43°36′25″N 2°47′54″E
- Country: France
- Region: Occitania
- Department: Hérault
- Arrondissement: Béziers
- Canton: Saint-Pons-de-Thomières
- Intercommunality: CC du Haut-Languedoc

Government
  - Mayor (2020–2026): Jim Ronez
- Area^{1}: 58.46 km^{2} (22.57 sq mi)
- Elevation: 700 m (2,300 ft)
- Highest elevation: 1,111 m (3,645 ft)
- Lowest elevation: 435 m (1,427 ft)
- Population (2023): 319
  - Density: 5.46/km^{2} (14.1/sq mi)
- Time zone: UTC+01:00 (CET)
  - Summer (DST): UTC+02:00 (CEST)
- INSEE/Postal code: 34107 /34330
- ^{1} French Land Register data, which excludes lakes, ponds, glaciers > 1 km^{2} (0.386 sq mi or 247 acres) and river estuaries.

Fraisse-sur-Agout (French pronunciation: [fʁajs(ə) syʁ aɡu(t)], lit. 'Fraisse on Agout'; also Fraïsse-sur-Agoût; Occitan: Fraisse d'Agot) is a commune in the Hérault department in southern France.

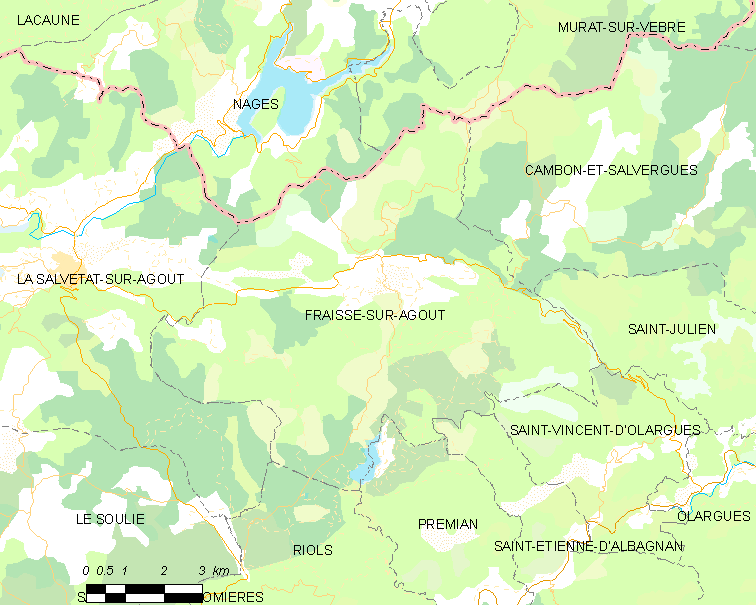
Map

== Population ==
Historical population
Year	Pop.	±% p.a.
1968	294	—
1975	270	−1.21%
1982	266	−0.21%
1990	249	−0.82%
1999	322	+2.90%
2007	357	+1.30%
2012	345	−0.68%
2017	340	−0.29%
2023	319	−1.06%
Source: INSEE

== See also ==
- Communes of the Hérault department
