= Montels, Hérault =

Montels
- Commune
- Coat of arms
- Location of Montels
- Location within France Location within Occitanie
- Coordinates: 43°17′44″N 3°01′51″E
- Country: France
- Region: Occitania
- Department: Hérault
- Arrondissement: Béziers
- Canton: Saint-Pons-de-Thomières

Government
  - Mayor (2020–2026): Olivier Henry
- Area^{1}: 7.3 km^{2} (2.8 sq mi)
- Elevation: 11 m (36 ft)
- Highest elevation: 24 m (79 ft)
- Lowest elevation: 0 m (0 ft)
- Population (2023): 247
  - Density: 34/km^{2} (88/sq mi)
- Time zone: UTC+01:00 (CET)
  - Summer (DST): UTC+02:00 (CEST)
- INSEE/Postal code: 34167 /34310
- ^{1} French Land Register data, which excludes lakes, ponds, glaciers > 1 km^{2} (0.386 sq mi or 247 acres) and river estuaries.

Montels is a commune in the Hérault department in the Occitanie region in southern France.

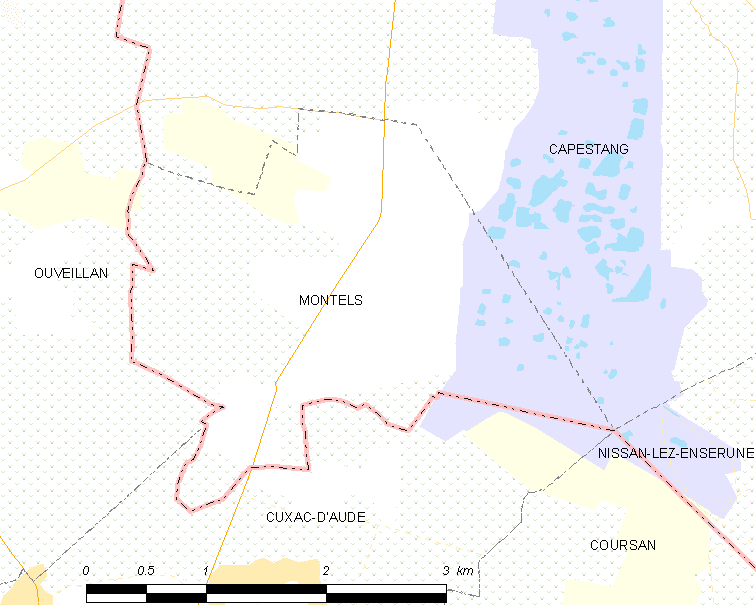
Map

== Population ==
Historical population
Year	Pop.	±% p.a.
1968	140	—
1975	127	−1.38%
1982	123	−0.46%
1990	134	+1.08%
1999	168	+2.54%
2007	225	+3.72%
2012	242	+1.47%
2017	252	+0.81%
2023	247	−0.33%
Source: INSEE

== See also ==
- Communes of the Hérault department
