= Jacques Soulie =

Jacques Soulie is the director of the Alliance Francaise (French Cultural Centre) in Kandy, Sri Lanka.
