= Le Soulié =

- Commune
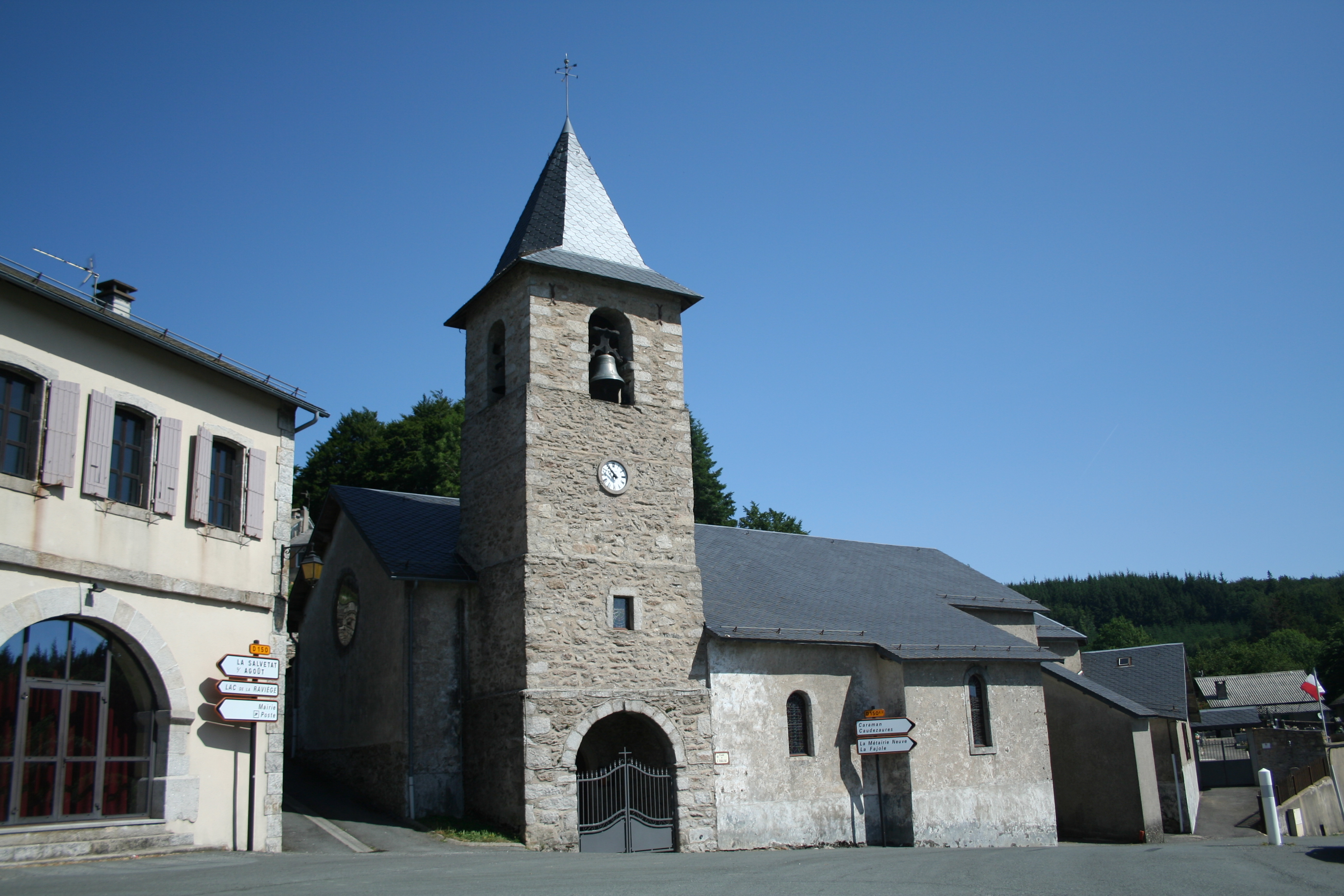
- The church of Le Soulié

- Coat of arms
- Location of Le Soulié
- Location within France Location within Occitanie
- Coordinates: 43°33′08″N 2°41′24″E
- Country: France
- Region: Occitania
- Department: Hérault
- Arrondissement: Béziers
- Canton: Saint-Pons-de-Thomières
- Intercommunality: CC du Haut-Languedoc

Government
  - Mayor (2022–2026): Pierre Bailly
- Area^{1}: 40.44 km^{2} (15.61 sq mi)
- Elevation: 880 m (2,890 ft)
- Highest elevation: 1,069 m (3,507 ft)
- Lowest elevation: 816 m (2,677 ft)
- Population (2023): 137
  - Density: 3.39/km^{2} (8.77/sq mi)
- Time zone: UTC+01:00 (CET)
  - Summer (DST): UTC+02:00 (CEST)
- INSEE/Postal code: 34305 /34330
- ^{1} French Land Register data, which excludes lakes, ponds, glaciers > 1 km^{2} (0.386 sq mi or 247 acres) and river estuaries.

Le Soulié (French pronunciation: [lə sulje]; Occitan: Lo Solièr) is a commune in the Hérault department in the Occitanie region in southern France.

== Population ==
Historical population
Year	Pop.	±% p.a.
1968	120	—
1975	111	−1.11%
1982	107	−0.52%
1990	119	+1.34%
1999	121	+0.19%
2007	115	−0.63%
2012	116	+0.17%
2017	130	+2.31%
2023	137	+0.88%
Source: INSEE

== See also ==
- Communes of the Hérault department
