= Sovam =

French company

- Industry: Manufacturing
- Founded: 1930
- Founder: André Morin
- Headquarters: Parthenay, Deux-Sèvres, France
- Products: Cars (in the 1960s) specialist vehicles and other airport handling equipment)
- Website: sovam-gse.com

The SOciété des Véhicules André Morin (SOVAM) is a French company that specializes in mechanized handling equipment for airports. In the mid-to-late 1960s they also operated an automobile manufacturing division that enjoyed a modicum of success but that was never profitable.

== Early history ==
The company was established by André Morin in 1930, and was an outgrowth of his father Robert Morin's existing car and carriage workshop business. Based in the commune of Parthenay in the department of Deux-Sèvres, Sovam specialized in the manufacture of "camions magasin", or mobile shop kiosks built on light truck platforms. In 1962 Morin spun this business off into the Etalmobil brand, and Sovam diversified into other lucrative niches, producing airport handling equipment and specialized light utility vehicles.

In 1964 they introduced a “Véhicule Utilitaire de Livraison” (light delivery vehicle) or `VUL' which used a fibreglass truck or van body mounted on a shortened Renault 4 chassis. The vehicle proved to be ideal for urban delivery work.

== Sovam sports cars ==
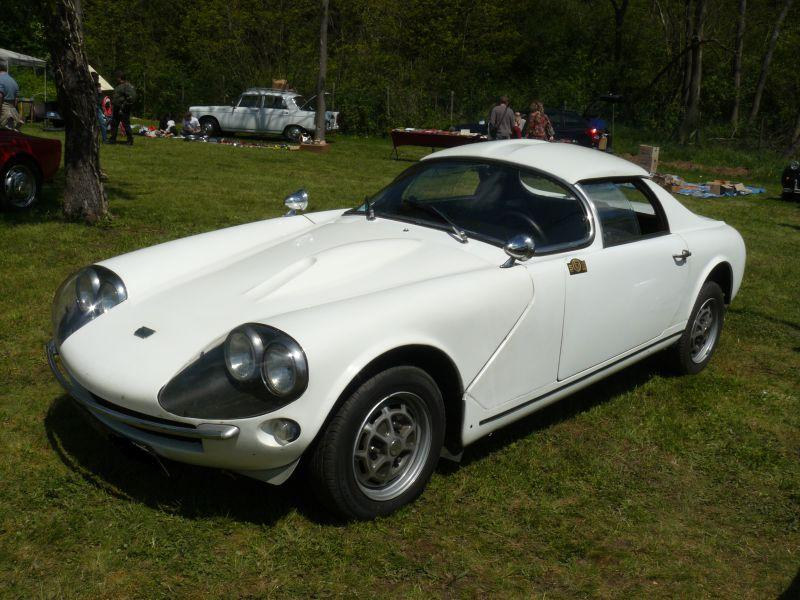
1100VS front three-quarter view

In 1965 Morin decided to launch a low-volume Sovam sports car. Like the VUL, the car would make extensive use of Renault 4 parts, including a shortened version of that car's punt chassis and its entire power-train. The Sovam inherited its donor car's front mid-engine, front wheel drive layout and fully independent suspension consisting of upper and lower A-arms with longitudinal torsion bars and telescopic dampers in front and trailing arms with transverse torsion bars and telescopic dampers in back. Renault also provided the windscreen, which came from the Floride, although the windscreen was flipped over for use in the Sovam. The expertise that the company had acquired producing fiberglass bodies for the VUL allowed for the rapid development of a suitable frame and body to be mounted on the chassis.

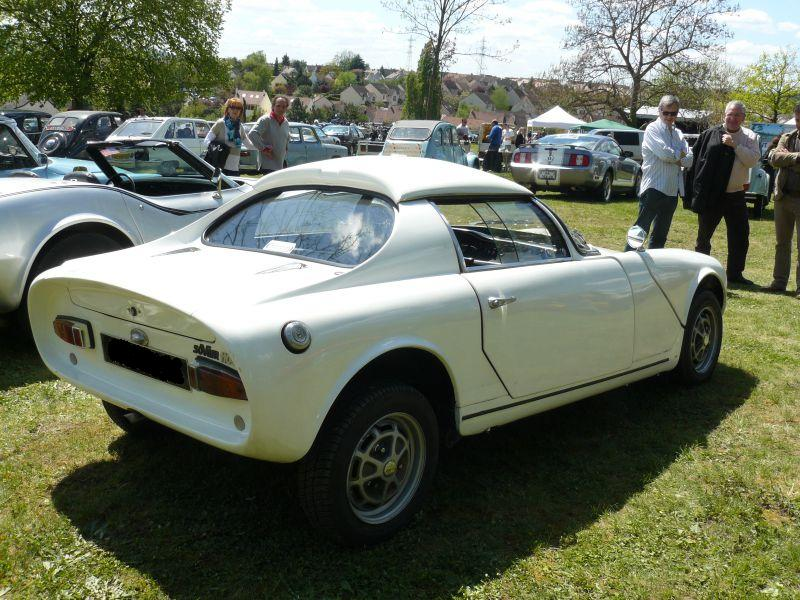
1100S rear three-quarter view

To design the body Morin turned to Jacques Durand, who had already done designs for the Atla, the Arista and the Sera. Durand drew a compact two-seat coupé with a greenhouse whose sides curved inward towards the centre of the car and that was topped by a removable roof panel. The lines of the car were low and sporty, although not universally acclaimed.

The Sovam 850 "Voiture de Sport" (VS) was presented at the Paris Motor Show in October 1964 and the interest that the car generated persuaded Morin to put it into production. The performance delivered by the 845 cc Billancourt engine fell short of the car’s sporting appearance, but with an initial list price of just 9,990 francs the car managed to attract a few buyers.

For 1966 the price of the 850VS was increased to 10,870 francs. That same year saw the introduction of a new 1100VS model with improved performance. With Renault’s recently introduced 1108 cc Cléon-Fonte engine producing 65 hp (48 kW) of power the 1100VS could attain a top speed of 165 km/h (102.5 mph). The cost of a 1100VS was set at 12,960 francs in 1966.

In 1967 a brand new model, the 1300GS, was released. This car had a new hardtop body with 2+2 seating and rectangular headlamps, but the biggest change was that the 1300GS received the 1255 cc engine and 5-speed manual transaxle from the Renault 8 Gordini. Four-wheel disk brakes were also an option. With a new power output of 77 kW (103 hp) at 6750 rpm and top speed of 195 km/h (121.2 mph) the 1300GS was much more athletic than its predecessors. The car debuted at the Paris Salon of the same year where it received the gold medal of the "grand prix de l’Art et de l’Industrie Automobile". The 1300GS was considerably more expensive than the previous models, being listed at 21,500 francs in October 1967.

The Sovam 1100VS was carried forward unchanged in 1967, although the price had been increased to 14,800 francs for most of the year, with a final rise to 15,500 at the October Salon for the 1968 model year. The original 850VS model was re-priced at 12,800 francs early in 1967 before being dropped from the lineup the same year.

By 1967 the Sovam sports car was not without its achievements. The unusual looks of the car nevertheless continued to attract criticism, and the Sovam failed to acquire the level of cachet achieved by competitors such as the Alpine A110 and Matra 530. October 1967 marked the last of the manufacturer’s three appearances at the annual Paris Motor Show. In 1968 Morin would produce just five Sovam sports cars. Over the span of its manufacturing life from 1965 to 1968, fewer than 150 cars were produced.

== Motorsports ==
Sovam entered a car in the Paris-Calcutta-Paris race in 1966 to demonstrate the car’s reliability. The 850VS entered was driven by Maïté Patoux and co-driven by Chantal Bernard. The two women successfully completed the 18500 kilometer distance between July and November, returning just before the 1966 Auto Show where the car was exhibited on the Sovam stand.

Patoux also drove an 1100VS model in the 12th “Rallye National d'Automne” in La Rochelle in November 1967 where she was first in the women's class.

Maurice Barros drove his 1100VS in 1967 in the second Critérium des Maures in the Var, the second Rallye des Roses in Antibes, and the first Rallye du Vaucluse.

An 850VS was prepared for local rallies organized by L'Ecurie Gâtine, which was a branch of the Automobile Club of Deux-Sèvres.

Several Sovam owners and amateur drivers also competed in various regional and national rallyes and hillclimbs with 850VS and 1100VS cars.

== Sportscar postscript ==
- A rumored revival of Sovam cars in 1972 with a new car using the 1600 cc engine and components from the Renault 16 was never realized.
- The Musée Chapy in Boujan-sur-Libron France has two Sovam in its collection.
- The Automobile Museum Aspang in Aspang-Markt Austria has one Sovam in its collection.

== Car specifications ==
Model:	SOVAM 850VS	SOVAM 1100VS	SOVAM 1300GS
Units produced:	62	77	6
Engine	Renault Billancourt	Renault Cléon-Fonte C1E	812 Gordini
Orientation	Longitudinal	Longitudinal	Longitudinal
Cylinders	4 cylinders	4 cylinders	4 cylinders
Valves	8 valves (2 per cylinder)	8 valves (2 per cylinder)	8 valves (2 per cylinder)
Displacement	845 cc (51.6 cu in)	1,108 cc (67.6 cu in)	1,255 cc (76.6 cu in)
Bore x Stroke	58 mm x 80 mm	70 mm x 72 mm	74.5 mm x 72 mm
Compression ratio	9.5:1	9.0:1	10.5:1
Carburation	One 1-barrel SOLEX 32 PBIC	One 2-barrel Weber	Two 2-barrel Weber 40 DCE
Horsepower	33.6 kW (45 hp) @ 5500 rpm	46.2 kW (62 hp) @ 6300 rpm	76.8 kW (103 hp) @ 6750 rpm
Torque			
Transmission	3-speed manual	4-speed manual	5-speed manual
Brakes (front)	180 mm Drum	Drum (optional Disc)	Disc
Brakes (rear)	160 mm Drum	Drum	
Tires	5,5X13/155X30/155/80/13	5,20 X 13/155 X 330/155/80/13	155 X 13 front - 145 X 13 rear
Length	3,630 mm (142.9 in)	3,630 mm (142.9 in)	3,830 mm (150.8 in)
Width	1,480 mm (58.3 in)	1,480 mm (58.3 in)	1,500 mm (59.1 in)
Height	1,110 mm (43.7 in)	1,110 mm (43.7 in)	
Track (F/R)	1,250 / 1,244 mm (49.2 / 49.0 in)	1,250 / 1,244 mm (49.2 / 49.0 in)	1,250 / 1,224 mm (49.2 / 48.2 in)
Vehicle weight	560 kg (1,234.6 lb)	570 kg (1,256.6 lb)	610 kg (1,344.8 lb)
Fuel capacity	26 L (6.9 US gal)	26 L (6.9 US gal)	48 L (12.7 US gal)
Top speed	145 km/h (90.1 mph)	170 km/h (105.6 mph)	195 km/h (121.2 mph)
Fuel consumption	6 L/100 km (39.2 mpg_{‑US})	8 L/100 km (29.4 mpg_{‑US})	

== Post-sportscar history ==
After the sportscar division of the company was closed down other branches of the business continued to prosper, in particular the division focusing on supplying airports with special purpose vehicles and rolling walkways.

In the mid-1980s, Sovam built the first model of a military vehicle for André Goldman. The venture was named SOVAMAG, which stood for "Société des Véhicules Automobiles Michel André Goldman". The resulting vehicle was called the Sovamag TC10. From 1988 it was manufactured industrially and mainly for export in the Techni Industrie plant in Bonchamp-les-Laval. In 1992 production was transferred to the Auverland (now S.N.A.A., Societe Nouvelle des Automobiles Auverland) plant in Saint Germain-Laval, but retained the Sovamag designation.

Siraga purchased Sovam in 1997. At the end of 2010 the business was acquired from them by the French group Mécanelle, whose principal shareholder was Russian financier Vladimir Zagaynova.

On June 24, 2015, SOVAM went into receivership. On November 1, 2015, the painting and sandblasting branch of the company was sold to BTS Industrie, and the airport equipment and services branch was acquired by the Kamkorp group and integrated into their product line as SOVAM GSE (Ground Support Equipment). The company went back into receivership on March 24, 2017.

On July 6, 2017, Sovam was acquired by Irish Investment company Abbey International Finance, and Tim Rane was appointed President and CEO.
