= Baronnie de Coussergues =

Family winery in Montblanc, Hérault, France

- Industry: Winery
- Founded: 1495
- Headquarters: Chateau de Coussergues, 34290 Montblanc, France
- Website: chateau-coussergues.fr

Baronnie de Coussergues is a family winery in Montblanc, Hérault, France, It raises vines on the grounds of Château de Coussergues, the estate covering over 620 hectares of which 120 are vineyards.

The production include white, red and rosé wines, they are wines of blend grape varieties or high in oak.

== See also ==
- List of oldest companies
- Henokiens
