= Sauvion =

Sauvion is a French surname. Notable people with the surname include:

- Carol Sauvion (born 1947), American crafts scholar, director and television producer
- Serge Sauvion (1929–2010), French film and voice actor

== See also ==
- Saubion, a commune in the Landes department in southwestern France
- Sauvian, a commune in the Hérault department in southern France
