= Canton of Béziers-2 =

Coordinates: 43.34°N 3.22°E

Béziers-2
- Canton
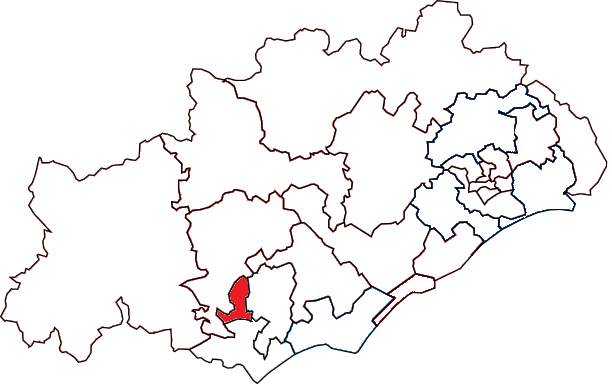
- Interactive map of Béziers-2
- Country: France
- Region: Occitania
- Department: Hérault
- No. of communes: {{{nbcomm}}}

Government
  - Representatives (2021–2028): Marie-Emmanuelle Camous; Gilles Sacaze
- Population (2023): 44,690
- INSEE code: 34 03

The canton of Béziers-2 is an administrative division of the Hérault department, southern France. Its borders were modified at the French canton reorganisation which came into effect in March 2015. Its seat is in Béziers.

== Composition ==
It consists of the following communes:

1. Béziers (partly)
2. Corneilhan
3. Lignan-sur-Orb

== Councillors ==
Election	Councillors	Party	Occupation
2015	Marie-Emmanuelle Camous	FN	Employee
2015	Jean-François Corbière	FN	Teacher

== Pictures of the canton ==
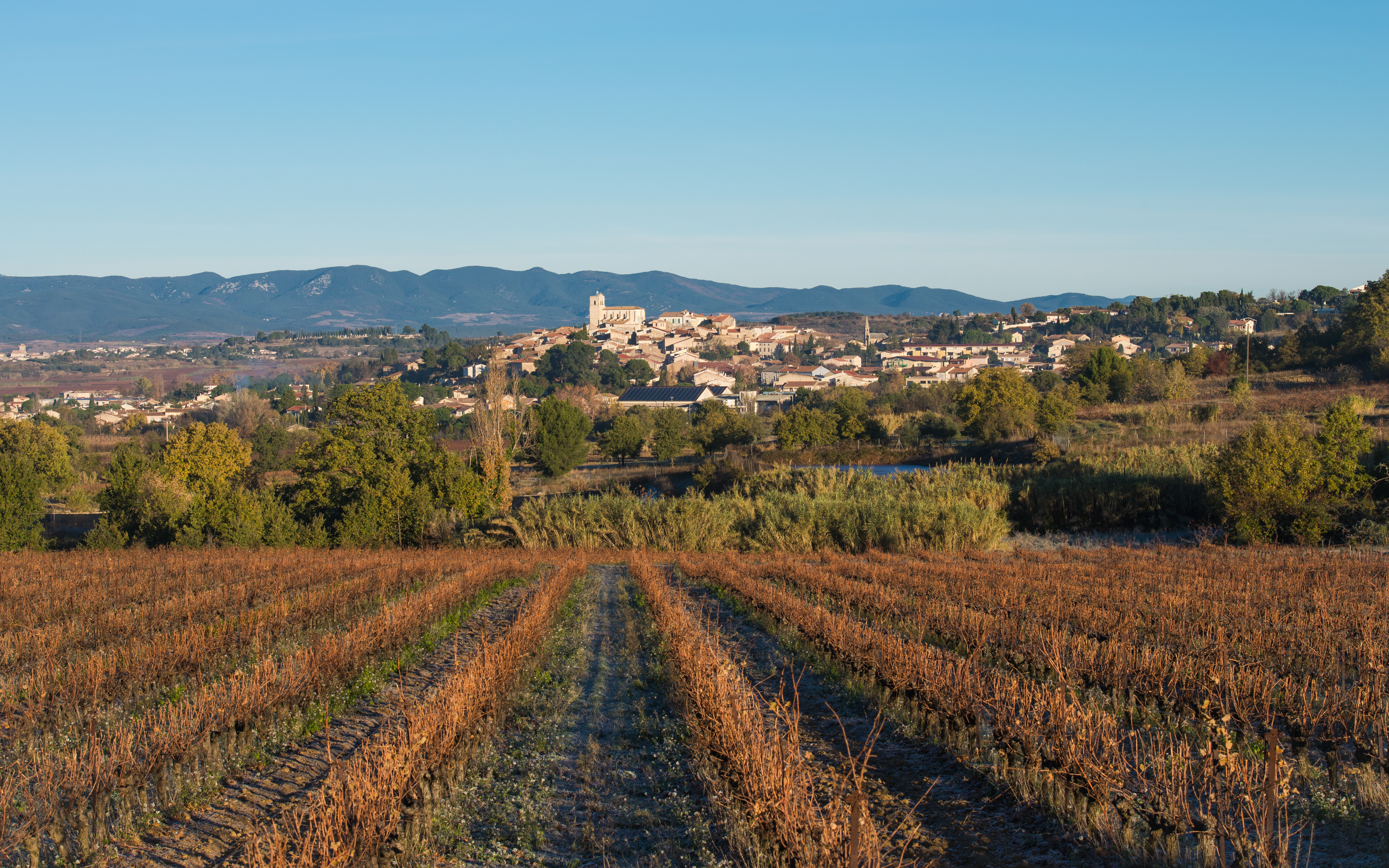
View of Corneilhan

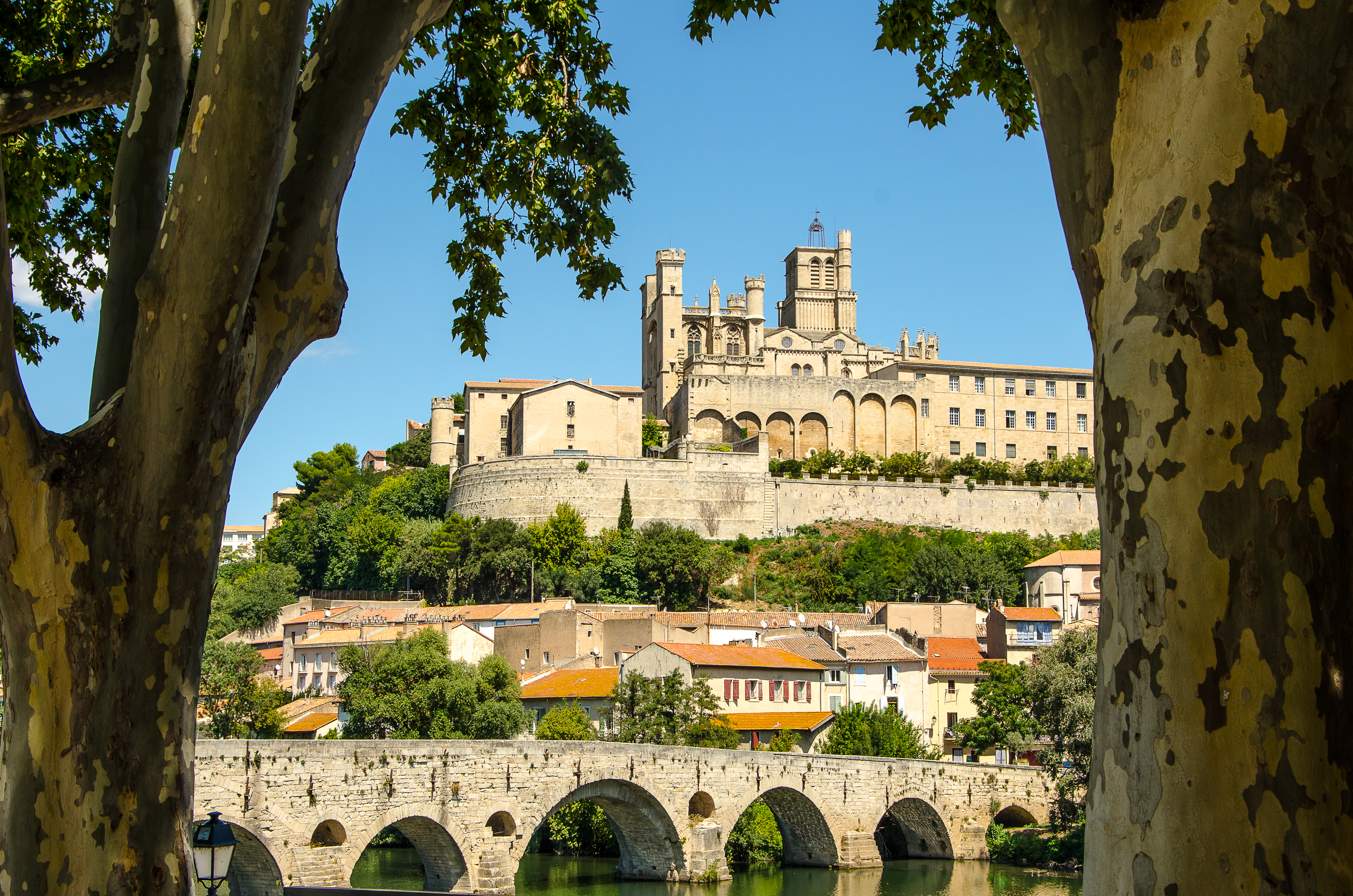
View of Béziers
