= Lignan-sur-Orb =

- Commune
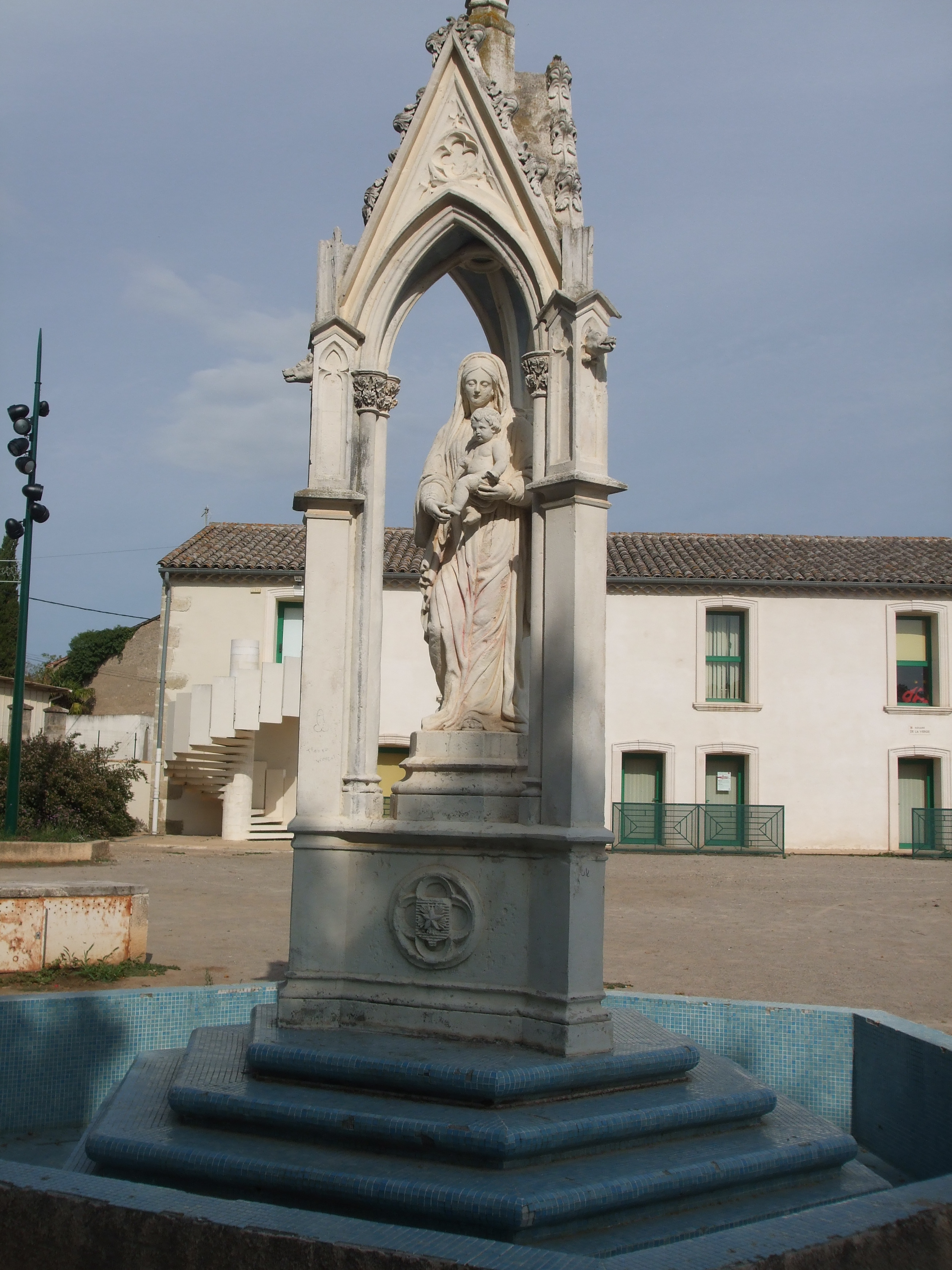
- Statue of the Virgin at Lignan-sur-Orb

- Coat of arms
- Location of Lignan-sur-Orb
- Location within France Location within Occitanie
- Coordinates: 43°23′05″N 3°10′16″E
- Country: France
- Region: Occitania
- Department: Hérault
- Arrondissement: Béziers
- Canton: Béziers-2
- Intercommunality: Béziers Méditerranée

Government
  - Mayor (2022–2026): Catherine Montaron Sanmarti
- Area^{1}: 3.41 km^{2} (1.32 sq mi)
- Elevation: 28 m (92 ft)
- Highest elevation: 86 m (282 ft)
- Lowest elevation: 9 m (30 ft)
- Population (2023): 3,227
  - Density: 946/km^{2} (2,450/sq mi)
- Demonym(s): Lignanais, Lignanaises
- Time zone: UTC+01:00 (CET)
  - Summer (DST): UTC+02:00 (CEST)
- INSEE/Postal code: 34140 /34490
- ^{1} French Land Register data, which excludes lakes, ponds, glaciers > 1 km^{2} (0.386 sq mi or 247 acres) and river estuaries.

Lignan-sur-Orb (French pronunciation: [liɲɑ̃ syʁ ɔʁb], literally Lignan on Orb; Occitan: Linha d'Òrb) is a commune in the Hérault département in the Occitanie region in southern France.

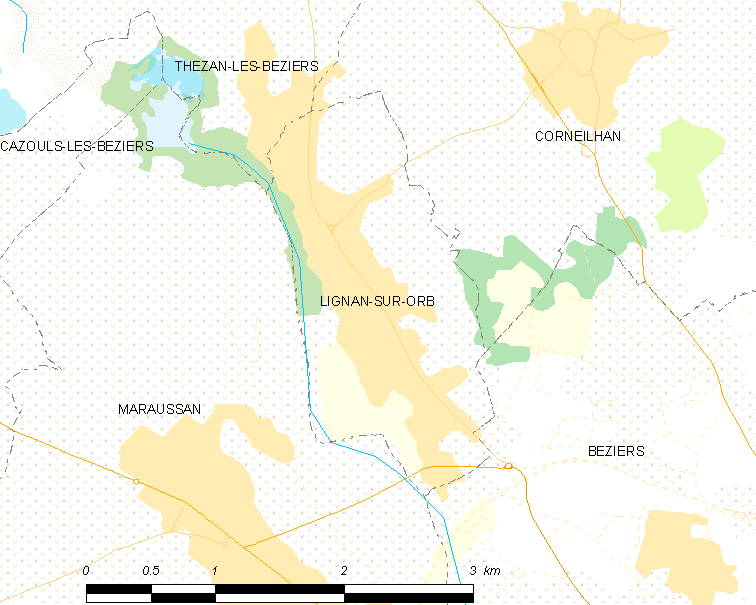
Map

== Population ==
Historical population
Year	Pop.	±% p.a.
1968	654	—
1975	1,081	+7.44%
1982	1,867	+8.12%
1990	2,543	+3.94%
1999	2,839	+1.23%
2007	2,929	+0.39%
2012	2,931	+0.01%
2017	3,199	+1.77%
2023	3,227	+0.15%
Source: INSEE

== See also ==
- Communes of the Hérault department
