= Canton of Béziers-1 =

Coordinates: 43.34°N 3.25°E

Béziers-1
- Canton
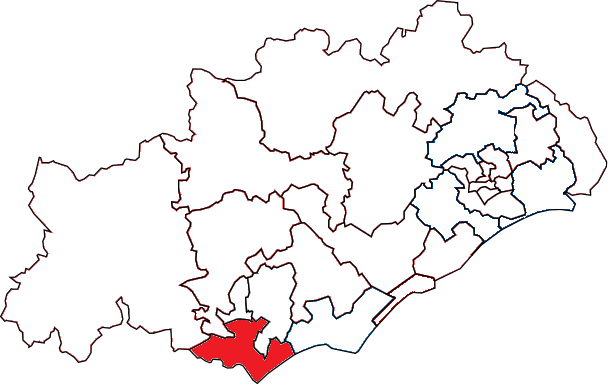
- Interactive map of Béziers-1
- Country: France
- Region: Occitania
- Department: Hérault
- No. of communes: {{{nbcomm}}}

Government
  - Representatives (2021–2028): Marie Hirth; Denis Marsala
- Population (2023): 42,618
- INSEE code: 34 02

== Composition ==
The canton of Béziers-1 is an administrative division of the Hérault department, southern France. Its borders were modified at the French canton reorganisation which came into effect in March 2015. Its seat is in Béziers.

It consists of the following communes:

1. Béziers (partly)
2. Lespignan
3. Nissan-lez-Enserune
4. Sérignan
5. Valras-Plage
6. Vendres

== Councillors ==
Election	Councillors	Party	Occupation
2015	Henri Bec	FN	Former magistrate
2015	Isabelle Des Garets	FN	Winegrower

== Pictures of the canton ==
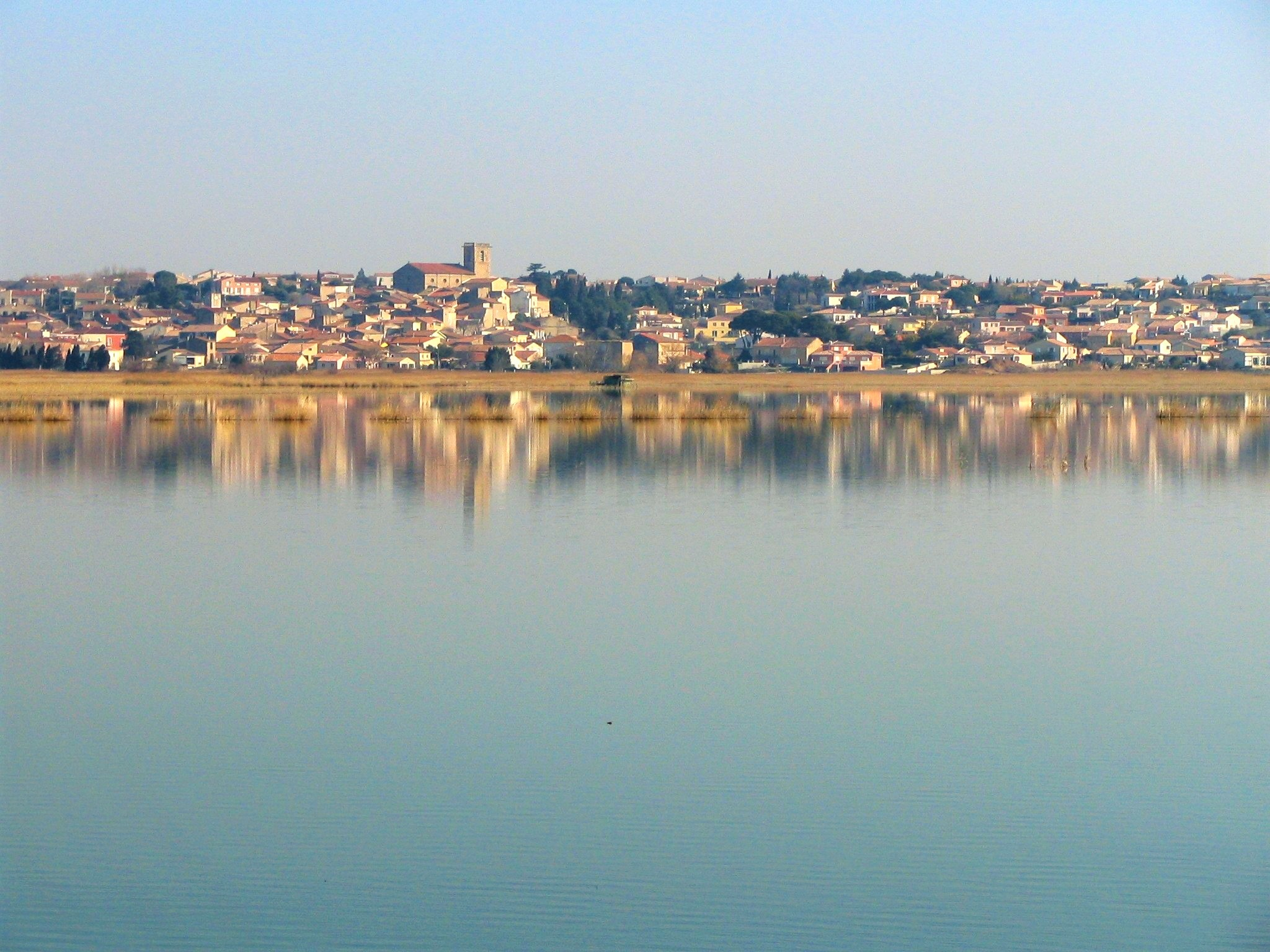
View of Vendres

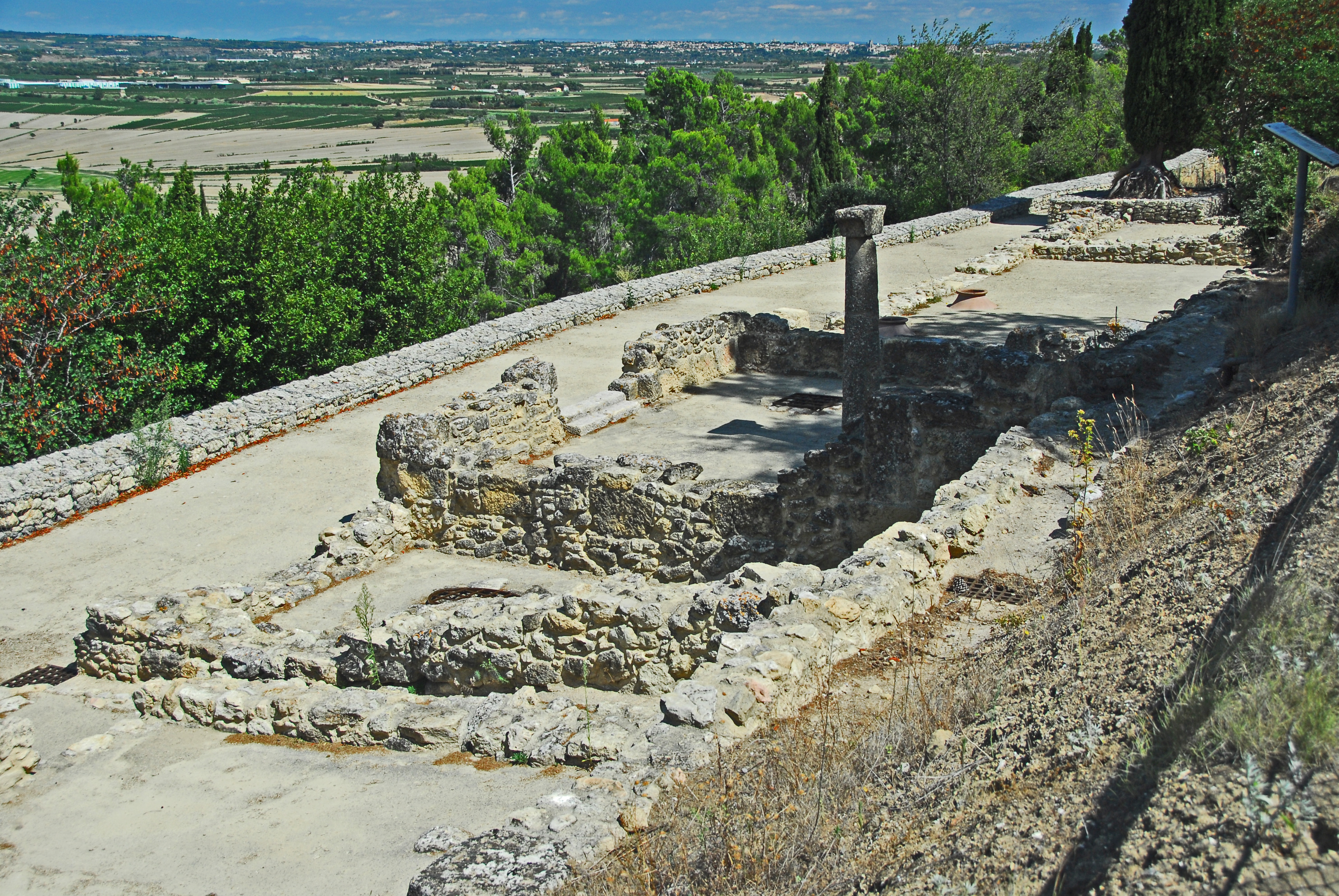
Oppidum d'Ensérune

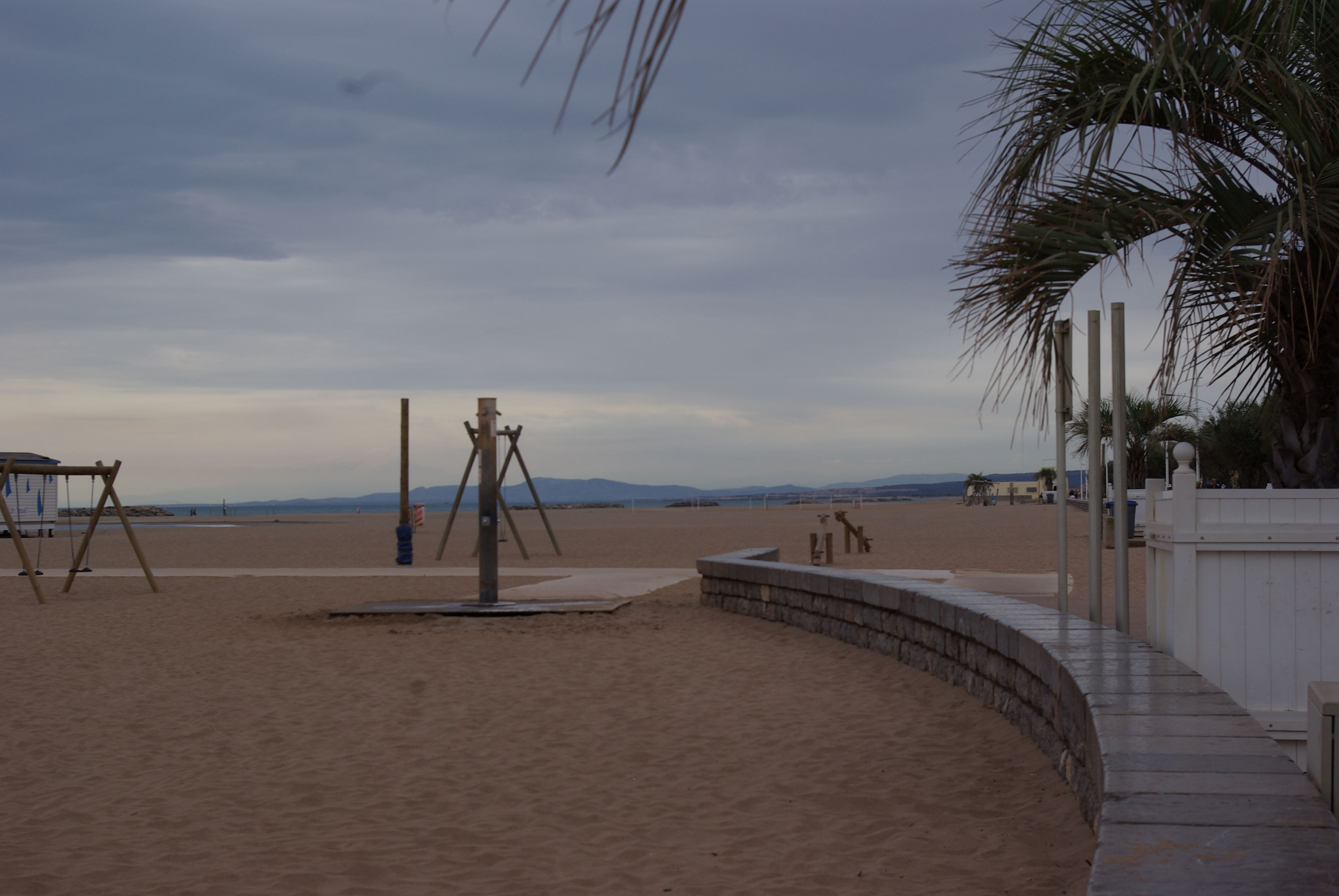
Beach in Valras-Plage
