= Servian, Hérault =

Servian
- Commune
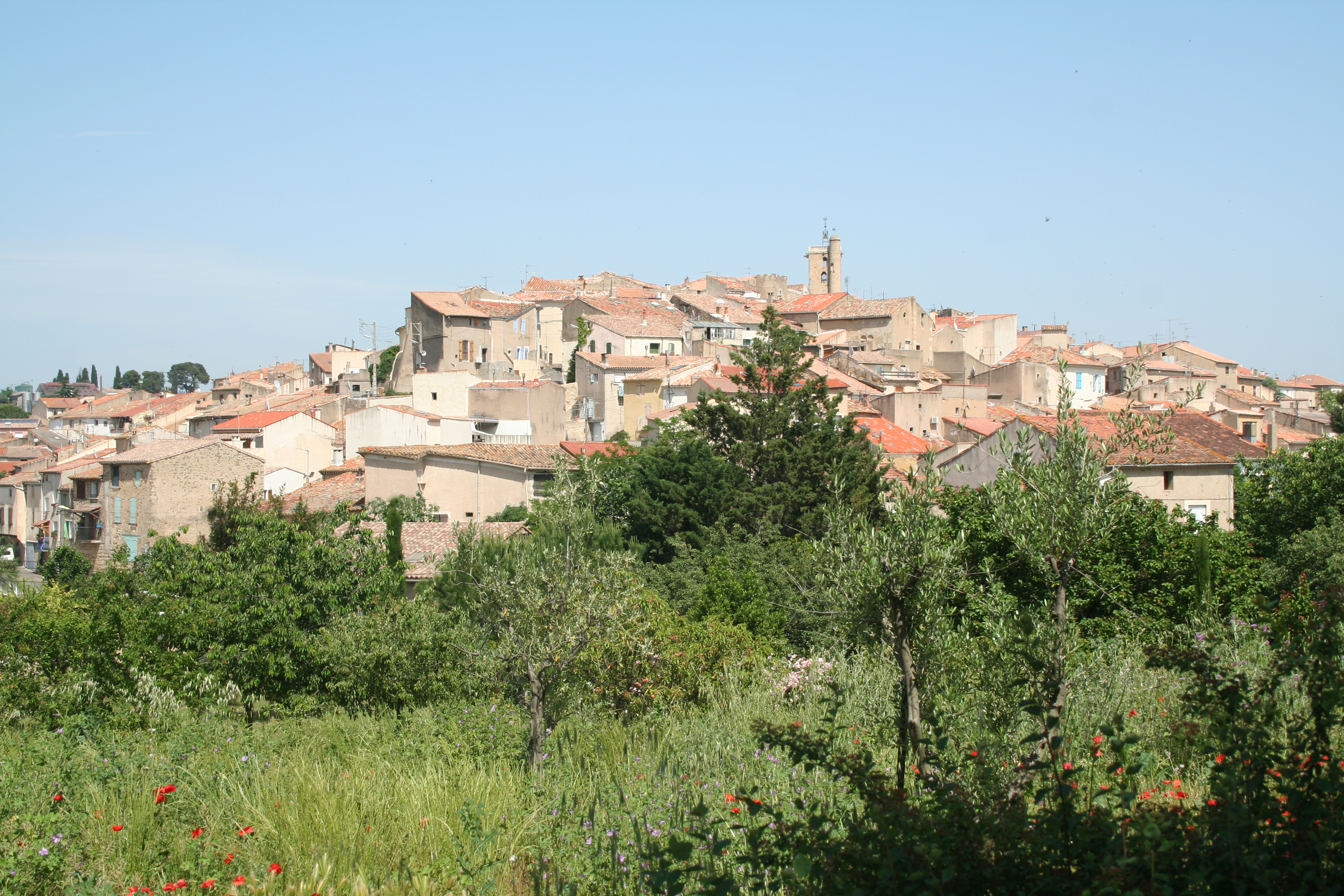
- A general view of Servian

- Coat of arms
- Location of Servian
- Location within France Location within Occitanie
- Coordinates: 43°25′41″N 3°17′59″E
- Country: France
- Region: Occitania
- Department: Hérault
- Arrondissement: Béziers
- Canton: Béziers-3
- Intercommunality: CA Béziers Méditerranée

Government
  - Mayor (2020–2026): Christophe Thomas
- Area^{1}: 40.61 km^{2} (15.68 sq mi)
- Elevation: 60 m (200 ft)
- Highest elevation: 103 m (338 ft)
- Lowest elevation: 19 m (62 ft)
- Population (2023): 5,517
  - Density: 135.9/km^{2} (351.9/sq mi)
- Time zone: UTC+01:00 (CET)
  - Summer (DST): UTC+02:00 (CEST)
- INSEE/Postal code: 34300 /34290
- ^{1} French Land Register data, which excludes lakes, ponds, glaciers > 1 km^{2} (0.386 sq mi or 247 acres) and river estuaries.

Servian (French pronunciation: [sɛʁvjɑ̃]; Occitan: Cervian) is a commune in the Hérault department in the Occitanie region in southern France.

== Geography ==
=== Climate ===
Servian has a mediterranean climate (Köppen climate classification Csa). The average annual temperature in Servian is 15.1 °C (59.2 °F). The average annual rainfall is 852.2 mm (33.55 in) with October as the wettest month. The temperatures are highest on average in July, at around 24.0 °C (75.2 °F), and lowest in January, at around 7.5 °C (45.5 °F). The highest temperature ever recorded in Servian was 41.0 °C (105.8 °F) on 7 July 1982; the coldest temperature ever recorded was −12.0 °C (10.4 °F) on 16 January 1985.

Climate data for Servian (1981–2010 averages, extremes 1980−2015)
Month	Jan	Feb	Mar	Apr	May	Jun	Jul	Aug	Sep	Oct	Nov	Dec	Year
Record high °C (°F)	21.5 (70.7)	23.6 (74.5)	29.4 (84.9)	32.0 (89.6)	35.0 (95.0)	37.6 (99.7)	41.0 (105.8)	40.6 (105.1)	37.5 (99.5)	33.4 (92.1)	25.6 (78.1)	23.6 (74.5)	41.0 (105.8)
Mean daily maximum °C (°F)	11.6 (52.9)	12.6 (54.7)	15.9 (60.6)	18.5 (65.3)	22.5 (72.5)	27.2 (81.0)	30.4 (86.7)	29.9 (85.8)	25.9 (78.6)	20.8 (69.4)	15.3 (59.5)	12.2 (54.0)	20.3 (68.5)
Daily mean °C (°F)	7.5 (45.5)	8.0 (46.4)	10.9 (51.6)	13.4 (56.1)	17.1 (62.8)	21.2 (70.2)	24.0 (75.2)	23.7 (74.7)	20.1 (68.2)	16.1 (61.0)	11.2 (52.2)	8.1 (46.6)	15.1 (59.2)
Mean daily minimum °C (°F)	3.3 (37.9)	3.3 (37.9)	5.9 (42.6)	8.2 (46.8)	11.7 (53.1)	15.1 (59.2)	17.7 (63.9)	17.5 (63.5)	14.3 (57.7)	11.5 (52.7)	7.0 (44.6)	4.0 (39.2)	10.0 (50.0)
Record low °C (°F)	−12.0 (10.4)	−8.3 (17.1)	−9.0 (15.8)	−1.3 (29.7)	2.8 (37.0)	7.4 (45.3)	9.6 (49.3)	9.0 (48.2)	4.9 (40.8)	−1.6 (29.1)	−7.3 (18.9)	−8.3 (17.1)	−12.0 (10.4)
Average precipitation mm (inches)	51.8 (2.04)	70.5 (2.78)	40.2 (1.58)	53.7 (2.11)	47.6 (1.87)	36.0 (1.42)	16.4 (0.65)	33.9 (1.33)	62.4 (2.46)	110.1 (4.33)	79.4 (3.13)	63.4 (2.50)	665.4 (26.20)
Average precipitation days (≥ 1.0 mm)	5.1	4.6	4.5	5.1	5.5	3.8	2.1	3.2	4.3	6.0	4.9	4.8	54.0
Source: Meteociel

== Population ==
Historical population
Year	Pop.	±% p.a.
1968	3,053	—
1975	2,832	−1.07%
1982	2,752	−0.41%
1990	3,056	+1.32%
1999	3,355	+1.04%
2007	4,049	+2.38%
2012	4,310	+1.26%
2017	4,937	+2.75%
2023	5,517	+1.87%
Source: INSEE

== See also ==
- Communes of the Hérault department
