= Cers, Hérault =

Cers
- Commune
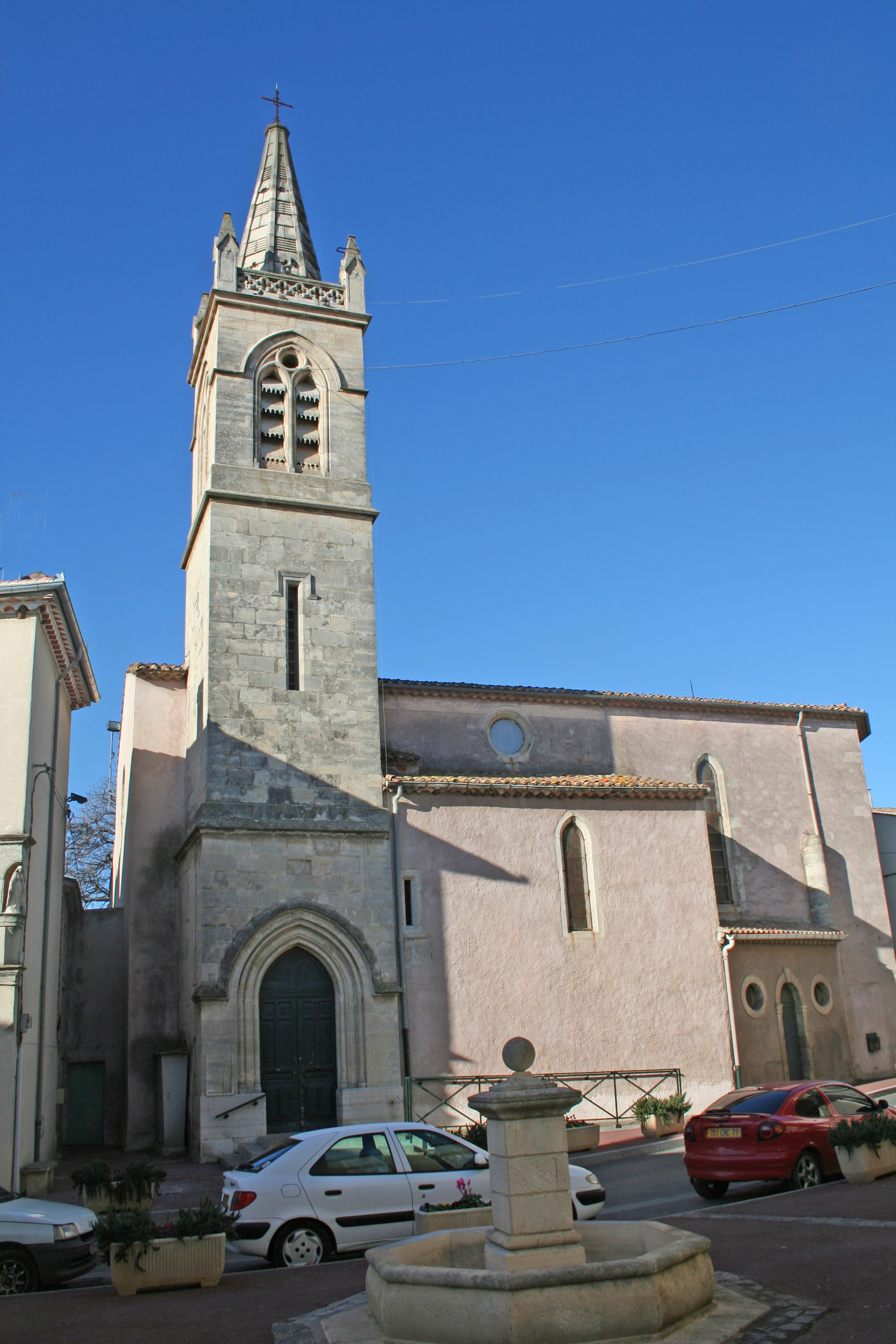
- Church St-Genies

- Coat of arms
- Location of Cers
- Location within France Location within Occitanie
- Coordinates: 43°19′27″N 3°18′19″E
- Country: France
- Region: Occitania
- Department: Hérault
- Arrondissement: Béziers
- Canton: Béziers-3
- Intercommunality: CA Béziers Méditerranée

Government
  - Mayor (2020–2026): Didier Bresson
- Area^{1}: 7.85 km^{2} (3.03 sq mi)
- Elevation: 15 m (49 ft)
- Highest elevation: 48 m (157 ft)
- Lowest elevation: 3 m (9.8 ft)
- Population (2023): 2,503
  - Density: 319/km^{2} (826/sq mi)
- Time zone: UTC+01:00 (CET)
  - Summer (DST): UTC+02:00 (CEST)
- INSEE/Postal code: 34073 /34420
- ^{1} French Land Register data, which excludes lakes, ponds, glaciers > 1 km^{2} (0.386 sq mi or 247 acres) and river estuaries.

Cers (French pronunciation: [sɛʁs]; Occitan: Cèrç) is a commune in the Hérault department in southern France.

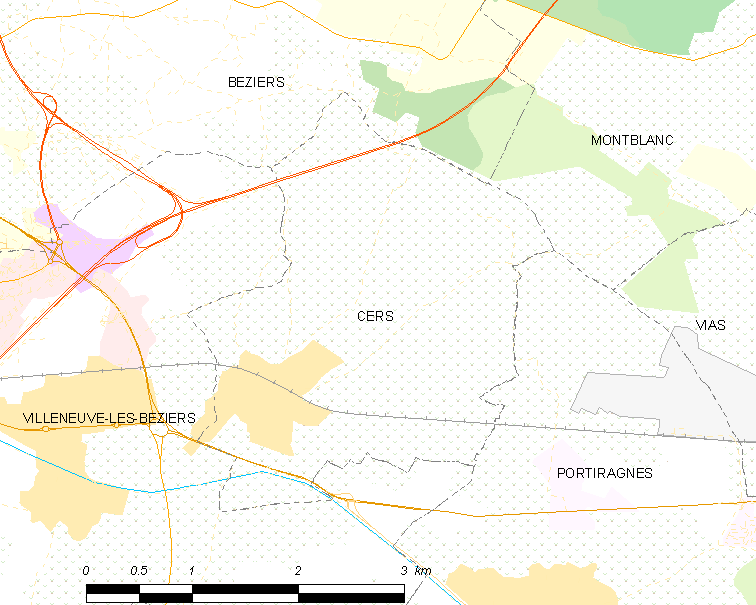
Map

== Population ==
Historical population
Year	Pop.	±% p.a.
1968	666	—
1975	840	+3.37%
1982	1,350	+7.01%
1990	1,798	+3.65%
1999	1,803	+0.03%
2007	2,222	+2.65%
2012	2,211	−0.10%
2017	2,566	+3.02%
2023	2,503	−0.41%
Source: INSEE

== See also ==
- Communes of the Hérault department
