= Canton of Béziers-3 =

Coordinates: 43.35°N 3.24°E

Béziers-3
- Canton
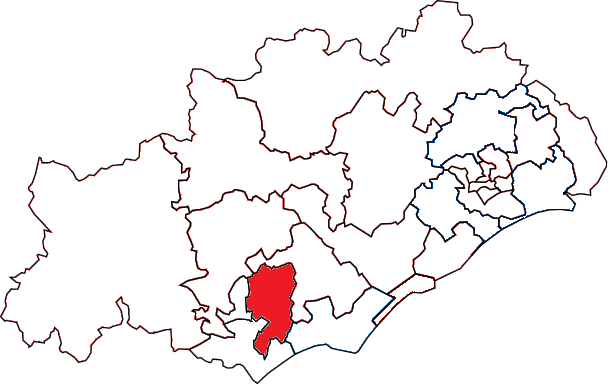
- Interactive map of Béziers-3
- Country: France
- Region: Occitania
- Department: Hérault
- No. of communes: {{{nbcomm}}}

Government
  - Representatives (2021–2028): Jean-Louis Respaud; Nicole Zenon
- Population (2023): 49,144
- INSEE code: 34 04

The canton of Béziers-3 is an administrative division of the Hérault department, southern France. Its borders were modified at the French canton reorganisation which came into effect in March 2015. Its seat is in Béziers.

== Composition ==
It consists of the following communes:

1. Bassan
2. Béziers (partly)
3. Boujan-sur-Libron
4. Cers
5. Espondeilhan
6. Lieuran-lès-Béziers
7. Sauvian
8. Servian
9. Villeneuve-lès-Béziers

== Councillors ==
Election	Councillors	Party	Occupation
2015	Franck Manogil	FN	Employee
2015	Nicole Zenon	FN	Teacher

== Pictures of the canton ==
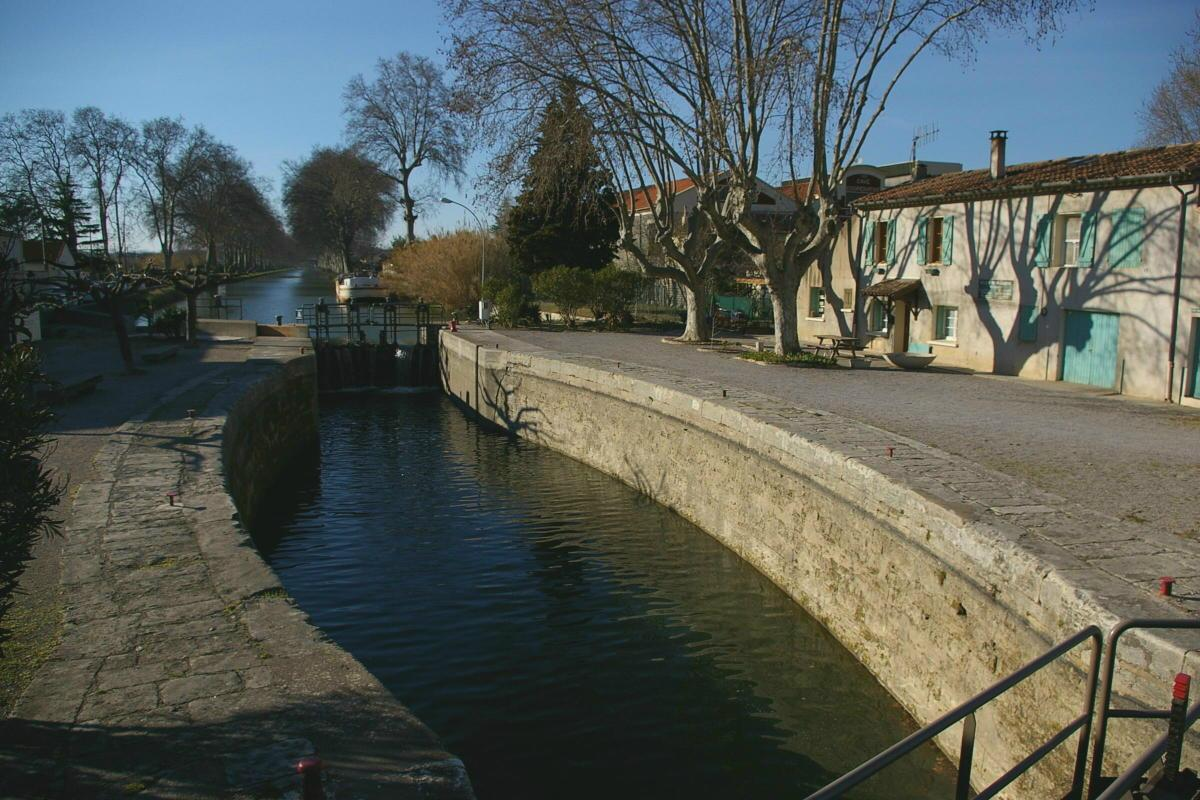
Villeneuve-lès-Béziers lock on the Canal du Midi

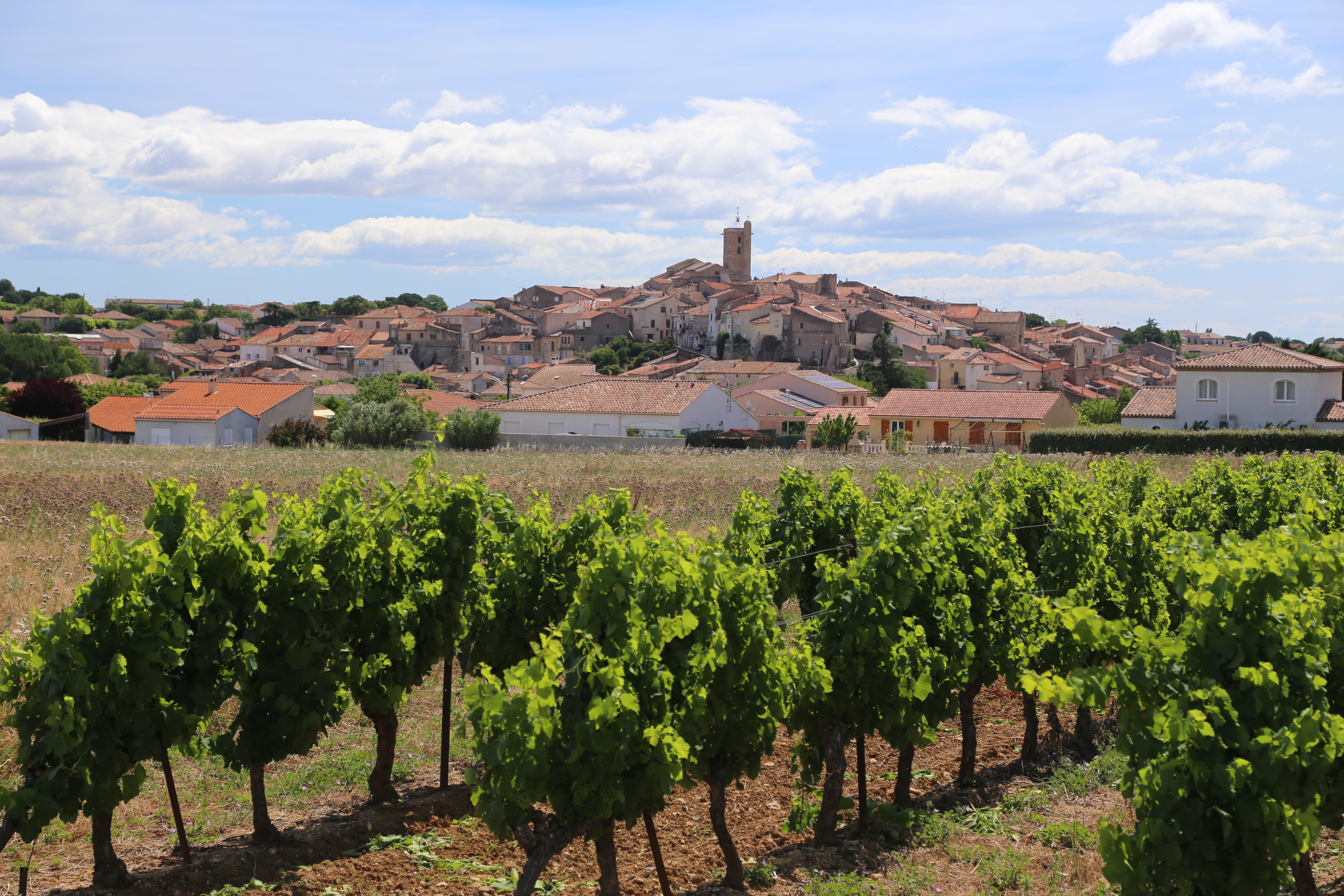
View of Servian

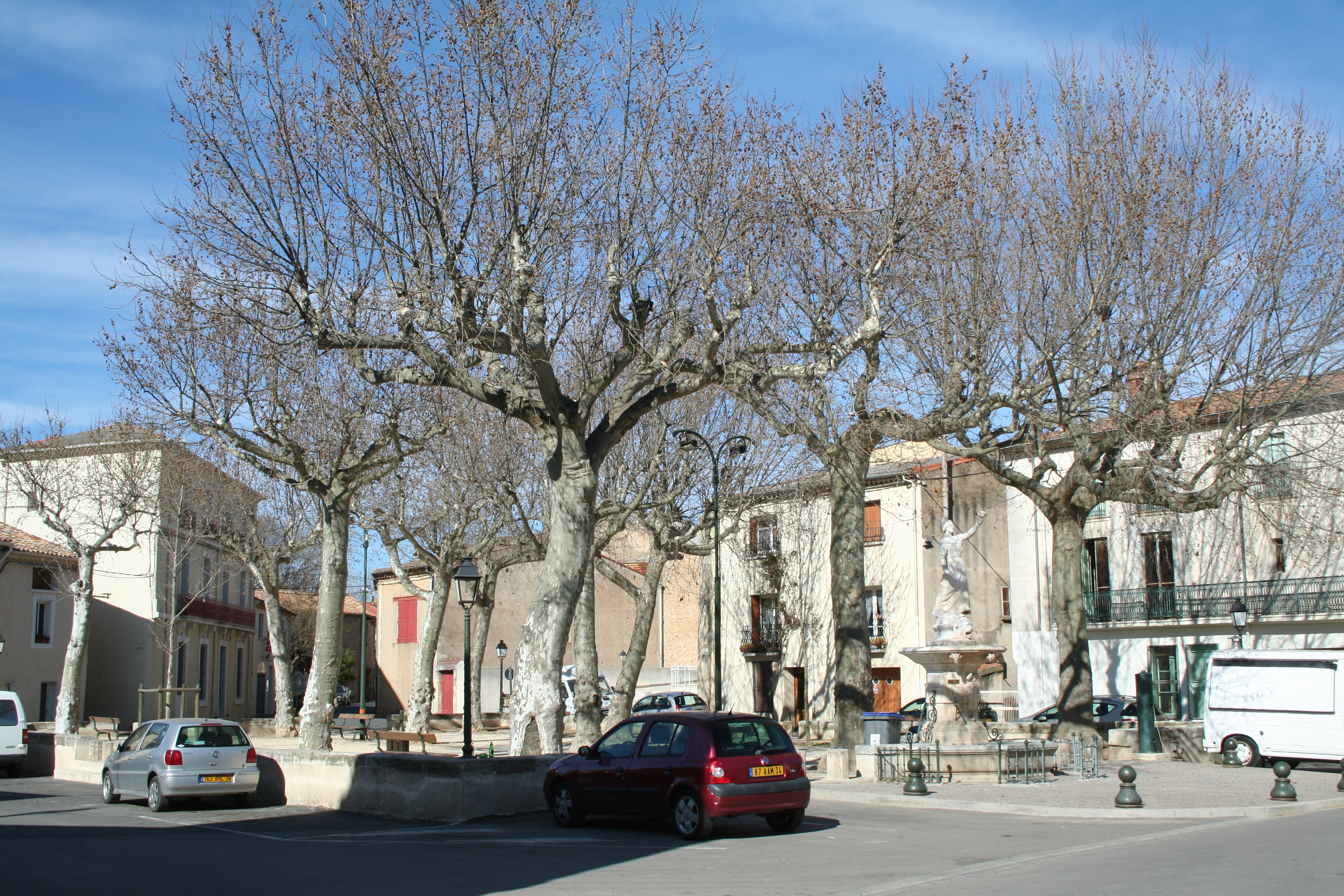
Square in Lieuran-lès-Béziers
