= Villeneuve-lès-Béziers =

- Commune
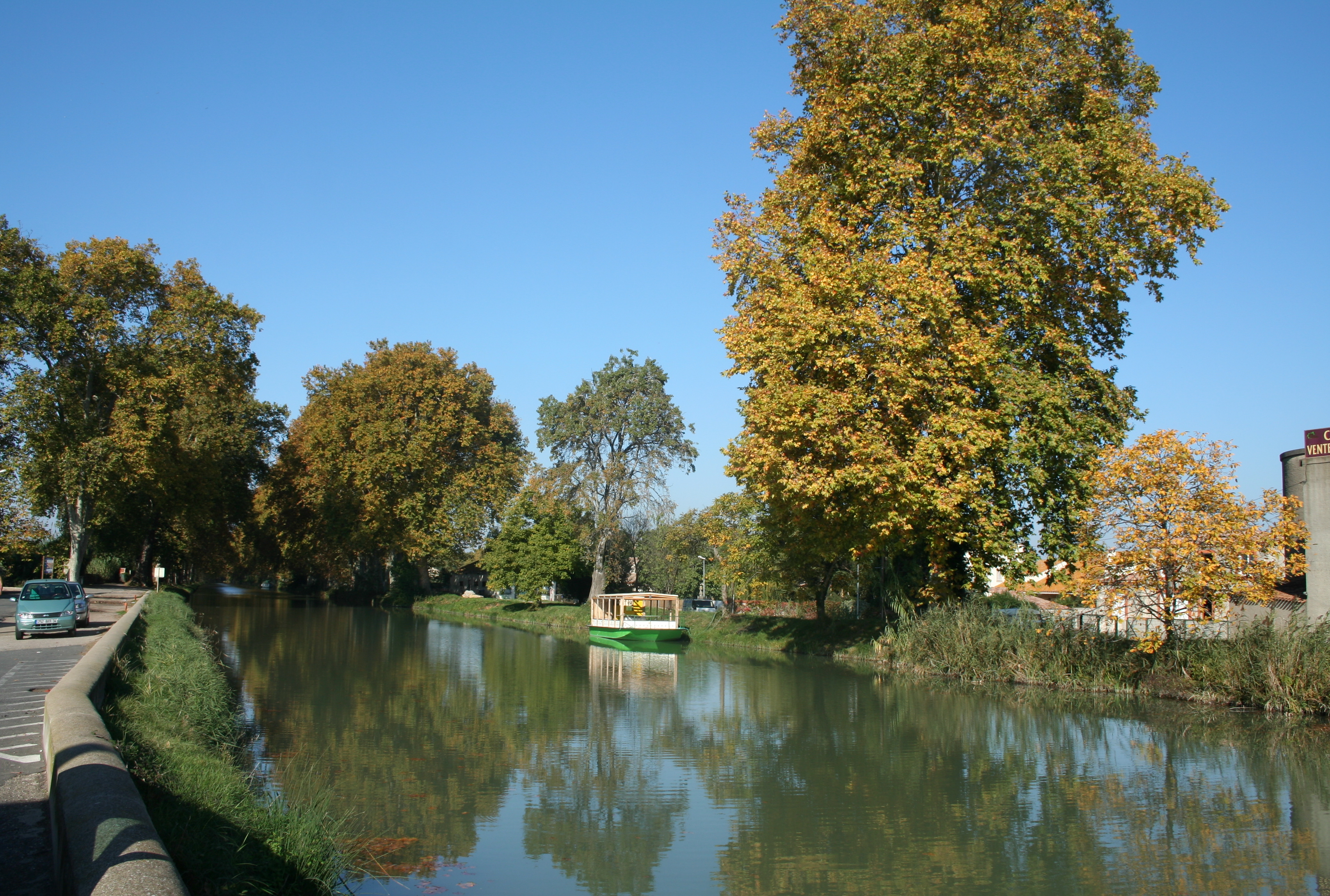
- Canal du Midi

- Coat of arms
- Location of Villeneuve-lès-Béziers
- Location within France Location within Occitanie
- Coordinates: 43°18′56″N 3°16′52″E
- Country: France
- Region: Occitania
- Department: Hérault
- Arrondissement: Béziers
- Canton: Béziers-3
- Intercommunality: CA Béziers Méditerranée

Government
  - Mayor (2020–2026): Fabrice Solans
- Area^{1}: 17.31 km^{2} (6.68 sq mi)
- Elevation: 6 m (20 ft)
- Highest elevation: 51 m (167 ft)
- Lowest elevation: 2 m (6.6 ft)
- Population (2023): 4,500
  - Density: 260/km^{2} (670/sq mi)
- Time zone: UTC+01:00 (CET)
  - Summer (DST): UTC+02:00 (CEST)
- INSEE/Postal code: 34336 /34420
- ^{1} French Land Register data, which excludes lakes, ponds, glaciers > 1 km^{2} (0.386 sq mi or 247 acres) and river estuaries.

Villeneuve-lès-Béziers (French pronunciation: [vilnœv lɛ bezje]; Occitan: Vilanòva de Besièrs) is a commune in the Hérault department in the Occitanie region in southern France.

== History ==
The village of Villeneuve was built on uncultivated land which was part of the property given by Emperor Charlemagne before 896, to a man named Valchaire who first built some buildings and a church, and who little by little, by the addition of other buildings formed a new town, hence the etymology of Villeneuve.

== Heraldry ==
Villeneuve-lès-Béziers	Sable, with a saltire lozengy argent and vert.

== Population ==
Historical population
Year	Pop.	±% p.a.
1968	2,315	—
1975	2,502	+1.12%
1982	2,546	+0.25%
1990	2,972	+1.95%
1999	3,434	+1.62%
2007	3,699	+0.93%
2012	4,149	+2.32%
2017	4,207	+0.28%
2023	4,500	+1.13%
Source: INSEE

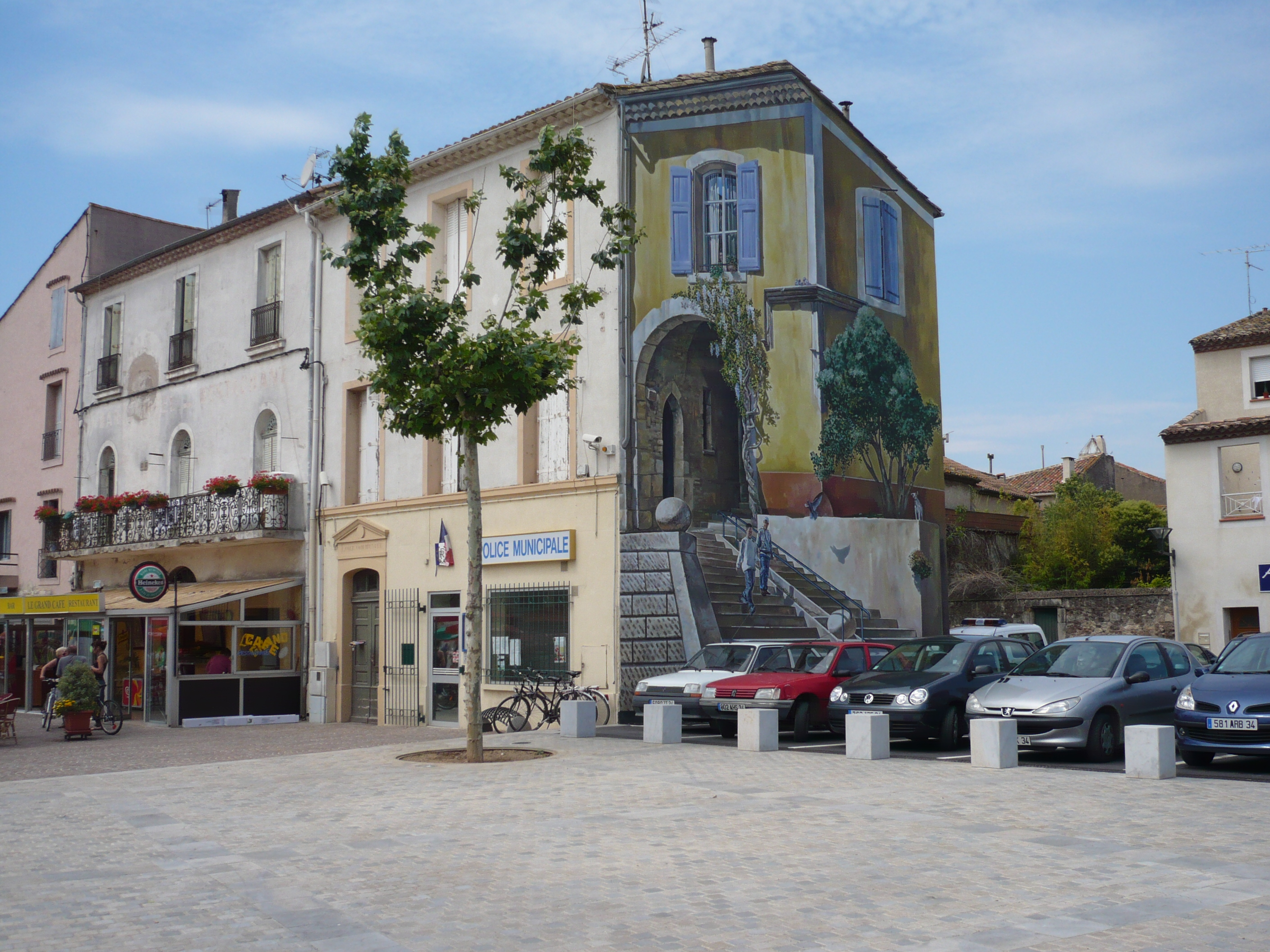
Street scene

== See also ==
- Communes of the Hérault department
