= Coulobres =

- Commune
- Coat of arms
- Location of Coulobres
- Location within France Location within Occitanie
- Coordinates: 43°27′02″N 3°16′49″E
- Country: France
- Region: Occitania
- Department: Hérault
- Arrondissement: Béziers
- Canton: Pézenas
- Intercommunality: CA Béziers Méditerranée

Government
  - Mayor (2020–2026): Gérard Boyer
- Area^{1}: 2.99 km^{2} (1.15 sq mi)
- Elevation: 72 m (236 ft)
- Highest elevation: 120 m (390 ft)
- Lowest elevation: 55 m (180 ft)
- Population (2023): 367
  - Density: 123/km^{2} (318/sq mi)
- Time zone: UTC+01:00 (CET)
  - Summer (DST): UTC+02:00 (CEST)
- INSEE/Postal code: 34085 /34290
- ^{1} French Land Register data, which excludes lakes, ponds, glaciers > 1 km^{2} (0.386 sq mi or 247 acres) and river estuaries.

Coulobres (French pronunciation: [kulɔbʁ]; Occitan: Colòbres) is a commune in the Hérault department in southern France.

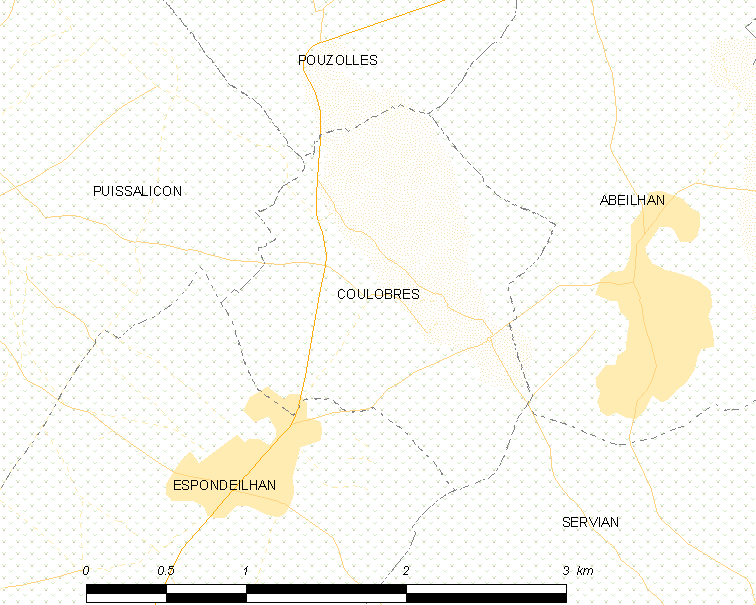
Map

== Population ==
Historical population
Year	Pop.	±% p.a.
1968	193	—
1975	152	−3.35%
1982	193	+3.47%
1990	202	+0.57%
1999	229	+1.40%
2007	290	+3.00%
2012	379	+5.50%
2017	360	−1.02%
2023	367	+0.32%
Source: INSEE

== See also ==
- Communes of the Hérault department
