= Corneilhan =

- Commune
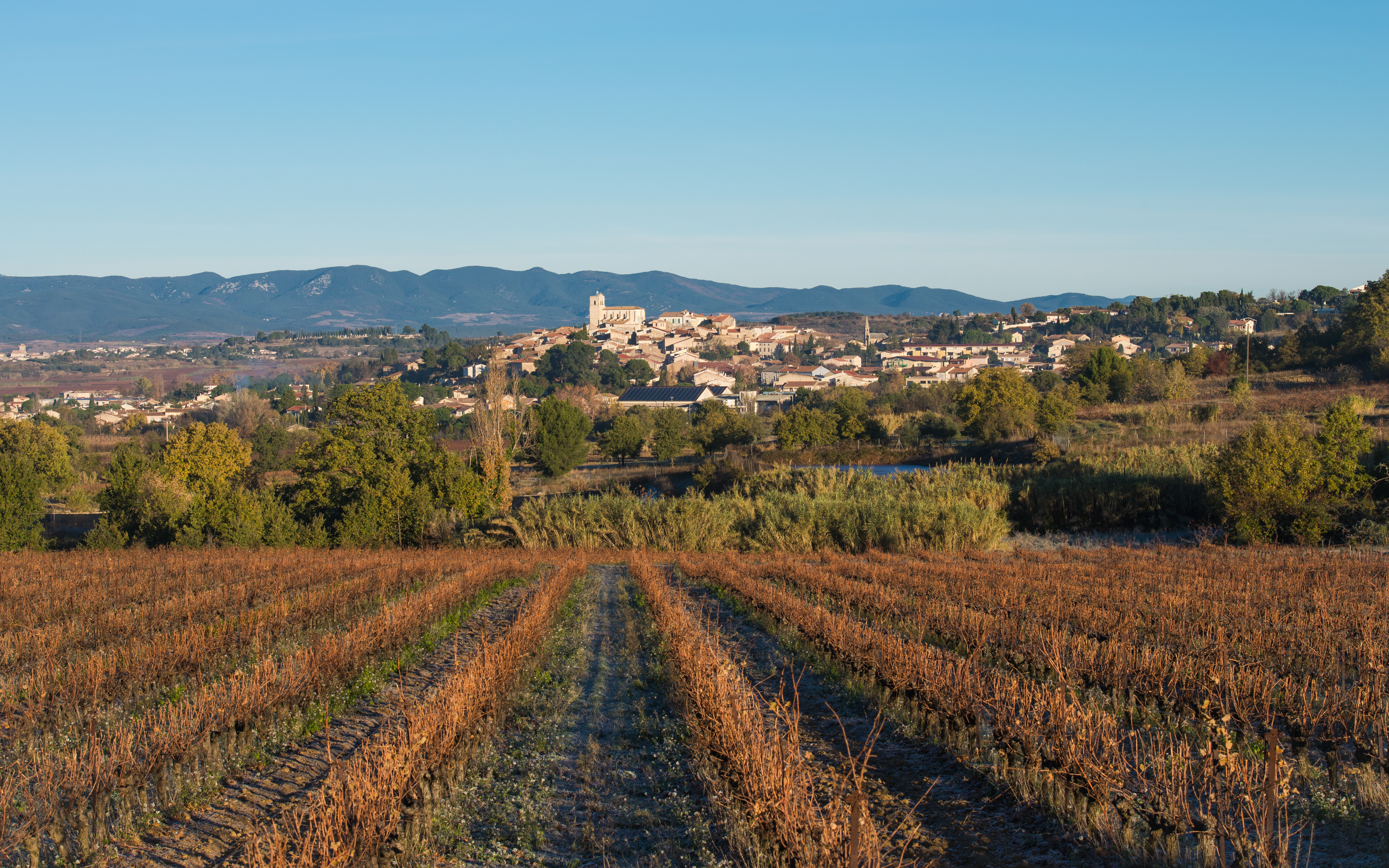
- A general view of Corneilhan

- Coat of arms
- Location of Corneilhan
- Location within France Location within Occitanie
- Coordinates: 43°24′03″N 3°11′35″E
- Country: France
- Region: Occitania
- Department: Hérault
- Arrondissement: Béziers
- Canton: Béziers-2
- Intercommunality: CA Béziers Méditerranée

Government
  - Mayor (2020–2026): Bertrand Gelly
- Area^{1}: 14.23 km^{2} (5.49 sq mi)
- Elevation: 49 m (161 ft)
- Highest elevation: 133 m (436 ft)
- Lowest elevation: 27 m (89 ft)
- Population (2023): 1,622
  - Density: 114.0/km^{2} (295.2/sq mi)
- Time zone: UTC+01:00 (CET)
  - Summer (DST): UTC+02:00 (CEST)
- INSEE/Postal code: 34084 /34490
- ^{1} French Land Register data, which excludes lakes, ponds, glaciers > 1 km^{2} (0.386 sq mi or 247 acres) and river estuaries.

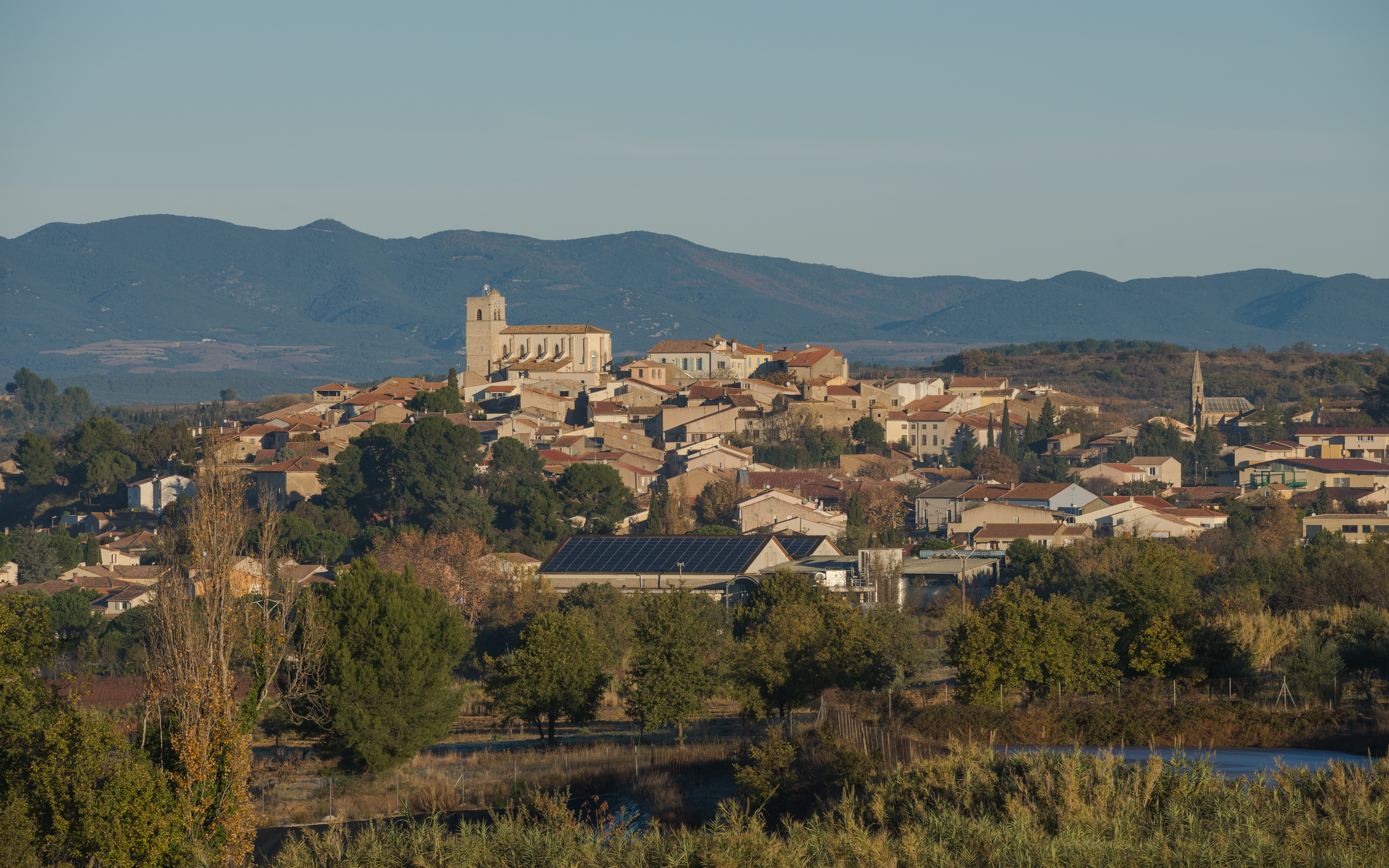
The historic part of the village.

Corneilhan (French pronunciation: [kɔʁnɛjɑ̃]; Occitan: Cornelhan) is a commune in the Hérault department in southern France.

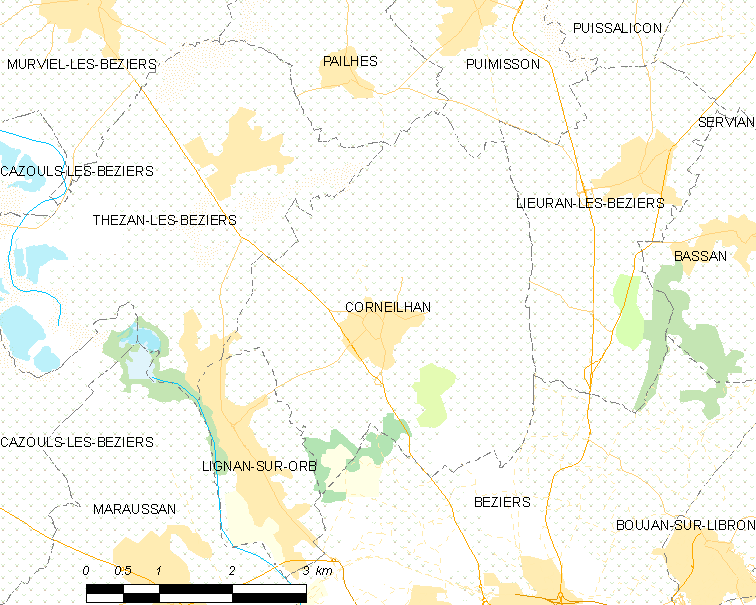
Map

== Population ==
Historical population
Year	Pop.	±% p.a.
1968	1,017	—
1975	1,136	+1.59%
1982	1,265	+1.55%
1990	1,363	+0.94%
1999	1,536	+1.34%
2007	1,491	−0.37%
2012	1,638	+1.90%
2017	1,717	+0.95%
2023	1,622	−0.94%
Source: INSEE

== See also ==
- Communes of the Hérault department
