= Sérignan =

- Commune
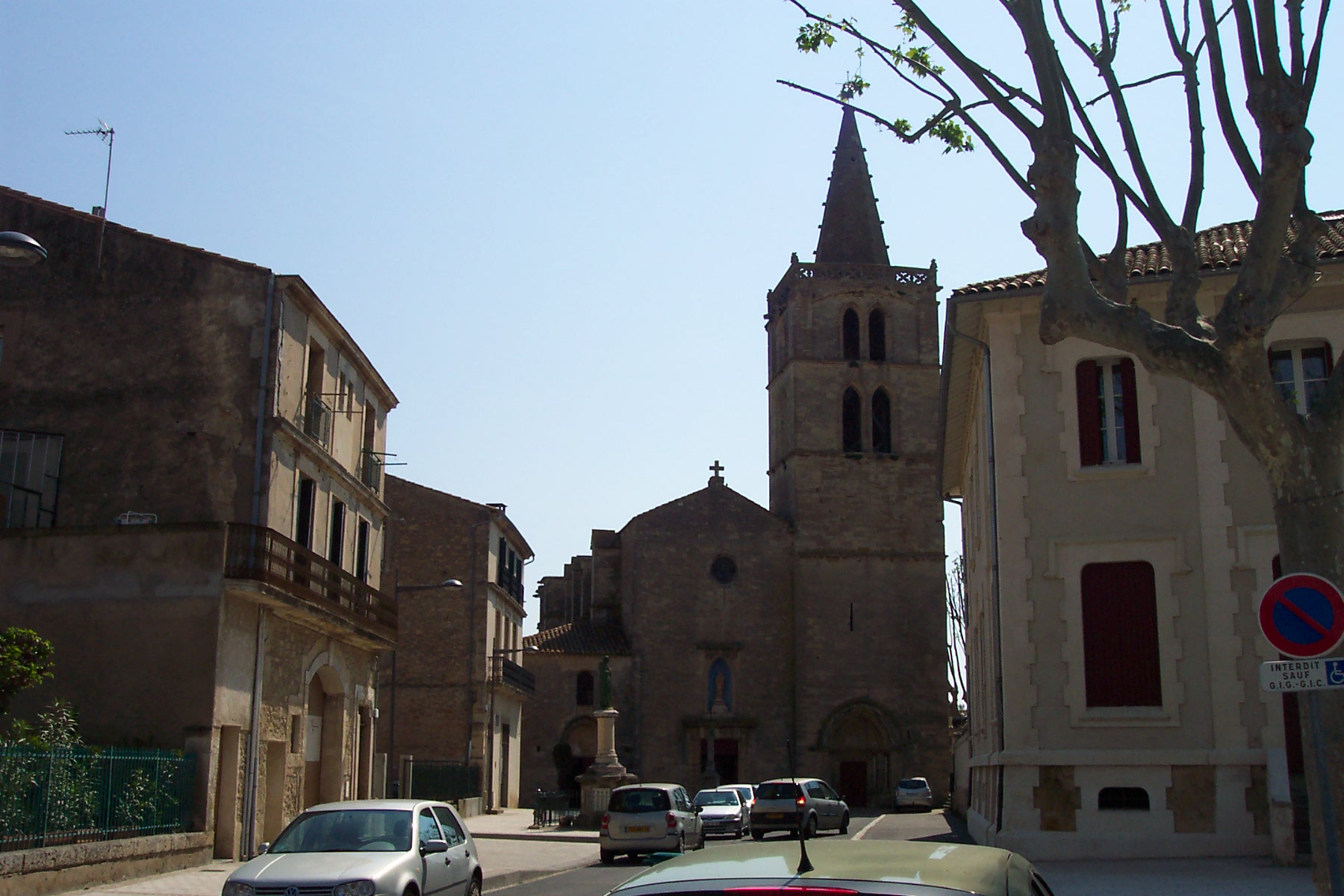
- A general view of Sérignan

- Coat of arms
- Location of Sérignan
- Location within France Location within Occitanie
- Coordinates: 43°16′51″N 3°16′42″E
- Country: France
- Region: Occitania
- Department: Hérault
- Arrondissement: Béziers
- Canton: Béziers-1
- Intercommunality: CA Béziers Méditerranée

Government
  - Mayor (2020–2026): Fréderic Lacas
- Area^{1}: 27.45 km^{2} (10.60 sq mi)
- Elevation: 7 m (23 ft)
- Highest elevation: 24 m (79 ft)
- Lowest elevation: 0 m (0 ft)
- Population (2023): 8,588
  - Density: 312.9/km^{2} (810.3/sq mi)
- Time zone: UTC+01:00 (CET)
  - Summer (DST): UTC+02:00 (CEST)
- INSEE/Postal code: 34299 /34410
- ^{1} French Land Register data, which excludes lakes, ponds, glaciers > 1 km^{2} (0.386 sq mi or 247 acres) and river estuaries.

Sérignan (French pronunciation: [seʁiɲɑ̃]; Occitan: Serinhan) is a commune in the Hérault department in the Occitanie region in southern France.

== Population ==
Historical population
Year	Pop.	±% p.a.
1968	2,950	—
1975	3,214	+1.23%
1982	3,884	+2.74%
1990	5,173	+3.65%
1999	6,134	+1.91%
2007	6,570	+0.86%
2012	6,836	+0.80%
2017	6,956	+0.35%
2023	8,588	+3.58%
Source: INSEE

== See also ==
- Communes of the Hérault department
