= Lieuran-lès-Béziers =

- Commune
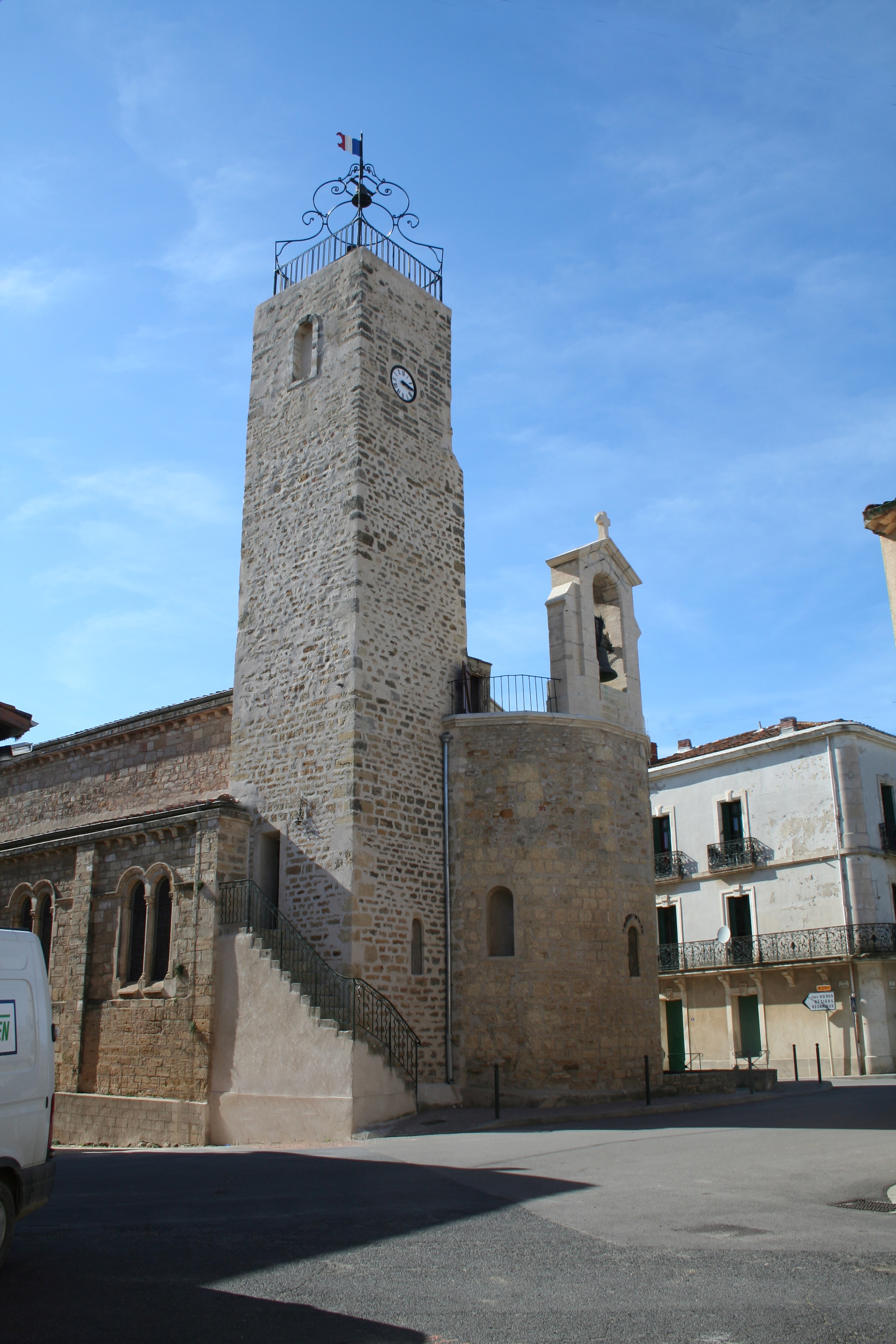
- Church

- Coat of arms
- Location of Lieuran-lès-Béziers
- Location within France Location within Occitanie
- Coordinates: 43°25′10″N 3°14′16″E
- Country: France
- Region: Occitania
- Department: Hérault
- Arrondissement: Béziers
- Canton: Béziers-3
- Intercommunality: CA Béziers Méditerranée

Government
  - Mayor (2020–2026): Robert Gely
- Area^{1}: 8.51 km^{2} (3.29 sq mi)
- Elevation: 59 m (194 ft)
- Highest elevation: 103 m (338 ft)
- Lowest elevation: 46 m (151 ft)
- Population (2023): 1,486
  - Density: 175/km^{2} (452/sq mi)
- Time zone: UTC+01:00 (CET)
  - Summer (DST): UTC+02:00 (CEST)
- INSEE/Postal code: 34139 /34290
- ^{1} French Land Register data, which excludes lakes, ponds, glaciers > 1 km^{2} (0.386 sq mi or 247 acres) and river estuaries.

Lieuran-lès-Béziers (French pronunciation: [ljøʁɑ̃ lɛ bezje], literally Lieuran near Béziers; Occitan: Liuran de Besièrs) is a commune in the Hérault département in the Occitanie region in southern France.

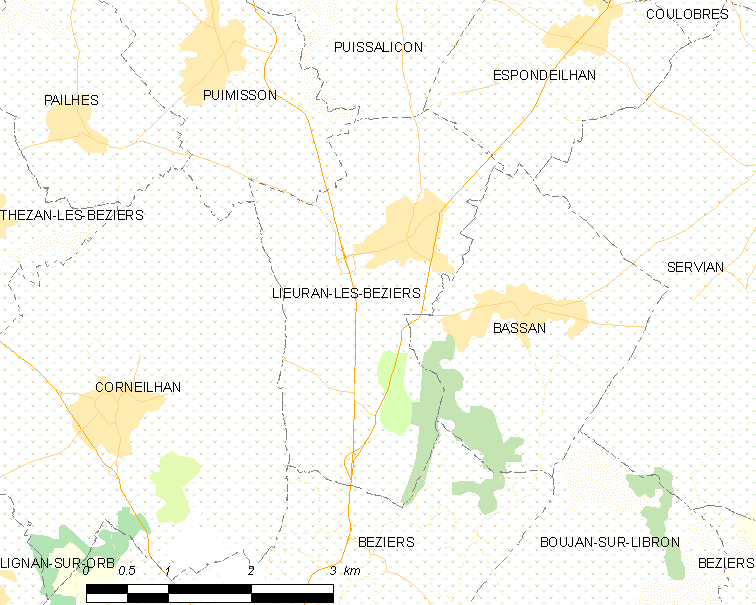
Map

== Population ==
Historical population
Year	Pop.	±% p.a.
1968	653	—
1975	595	−1.32%
1982	801	+4.34%
1990	964	+2.34%
1999	927	−0.43%
2007	1,108	+2.25%
2012	1,446	+5.47%
2017	1,396	−0.70%
2023	1,486	+1.05%
Source: INSEE

== See also ==
- Communes of the Hérault department
