= Valras-Plage =

- Commune
- Location of Valras-Plage
- Location within France Location within Occitanie
- Coordinates: 43°14′52″N 3°17′30″E
- Country: France
- Region: Occitania
- Department: Hérault
- Arrondissement: Béziers
- Canton: Béziers-1
- Intercommunality: CA Béziers Méditerranée

Government
  - Mayor (2020–2026): Daniel Ballester
- Area^{1}: 2.35 km^{2} (0.91 sq mi)
- Highest elevation: 10 m (33 ft)
- Lowest elevation: 0 m (0 ft)
- Population (2023): 4,432
  - Density: 1,890/km^{2} (4,880/sq mi)
- Time zone: UTC+01:00 (CET)
  - Summer (DST): UTC+02:00 (CEST)
- INSEE/Postal code: 34324 /34350
- Website: https://www.ville-valrasplage.fr/
- ^{1} French Land Register data, which excludes lakes, ponds, glaciers > 1 km^{2} (0.386 sq mi or 247 acres) and river estuaries.

Valras-Plage (French pronunciation: [valʁas plaʒ]; Occitan: Valrans Plaja), commonly known as Valras, is a resort town in the Hérault department in the Occitanie region in southern France. The town in English translates to Valras-Beach or beach of Valras. It is a popular tourist destination along the Languedoc coast, especially with campers due to the large number of camping sites on its western edge. Many people have second homes in the town, most notably villas, apartments, and condominiums. The town is located at the mouth of the river Orb, which divides it in two.

== Population ==
Historical population
Year	Pop.	±% p.a.
1968	2,190	—
1975	2,539	+2.13%
1982	2,588	+0.27%
1990	3,043	+2.05%
1999	3,625	+1.96%
2007	4,391	+2.43%
2012	4,348	−0.20%
2017	4,207	−0.66%
2023	4,432	+0.87%
Source: INSEE

== See also ==
- Communes of the Hérault department
