= Communauté d'agglomération Béziers Méditerranée =

Coordinates: 43°20′N 03°15′E

Béziers Méditerranée
- Communauté d'agglomération
- Country: France
- Region: Occitania
- Department: Hérault
- No. of communes: {{{nbcomm}}}
- Established: 2002
- Area: 303.0 km^{2} (117.0 sq mi)
- Population (2017): 124,799
  - Density: 411.9/km^{2} (1,067/sq mi)
- Website: lagglo.fr

Béziers Méditerranée is the communauté d'agglomération, an intercommunal structure, centred on the city of Béziers. It is located in the Hérault department, in the Occitanie region, southern France. It was established in January 2002. It was expanded with 4 other communes in January 2017. Its seat is in Béziers. Its area is 303.0 km^{2}. Its population was 124,799 in 2017, of which 77,177 in Béziers proper.

== Composition ==
The communauté d'agglomération consists of the following 17 communes:

1. Alignan-du-Vent
2. Bassan
3. Béziers
4. Boujan-sur-Libron
5. Cers
6. Corneilhan
7. Coulobres
8. Espondeilhan
9. Lieuran-lès-Béziers
10. Lignan-sur-Orb
11. Montblanc
12. Sauvian
13. Sérignan
14. Servian
15. Valras-Plage
16. Valros
17. Villeneuve-lès-Béziers
