= Bassan =

- Commune
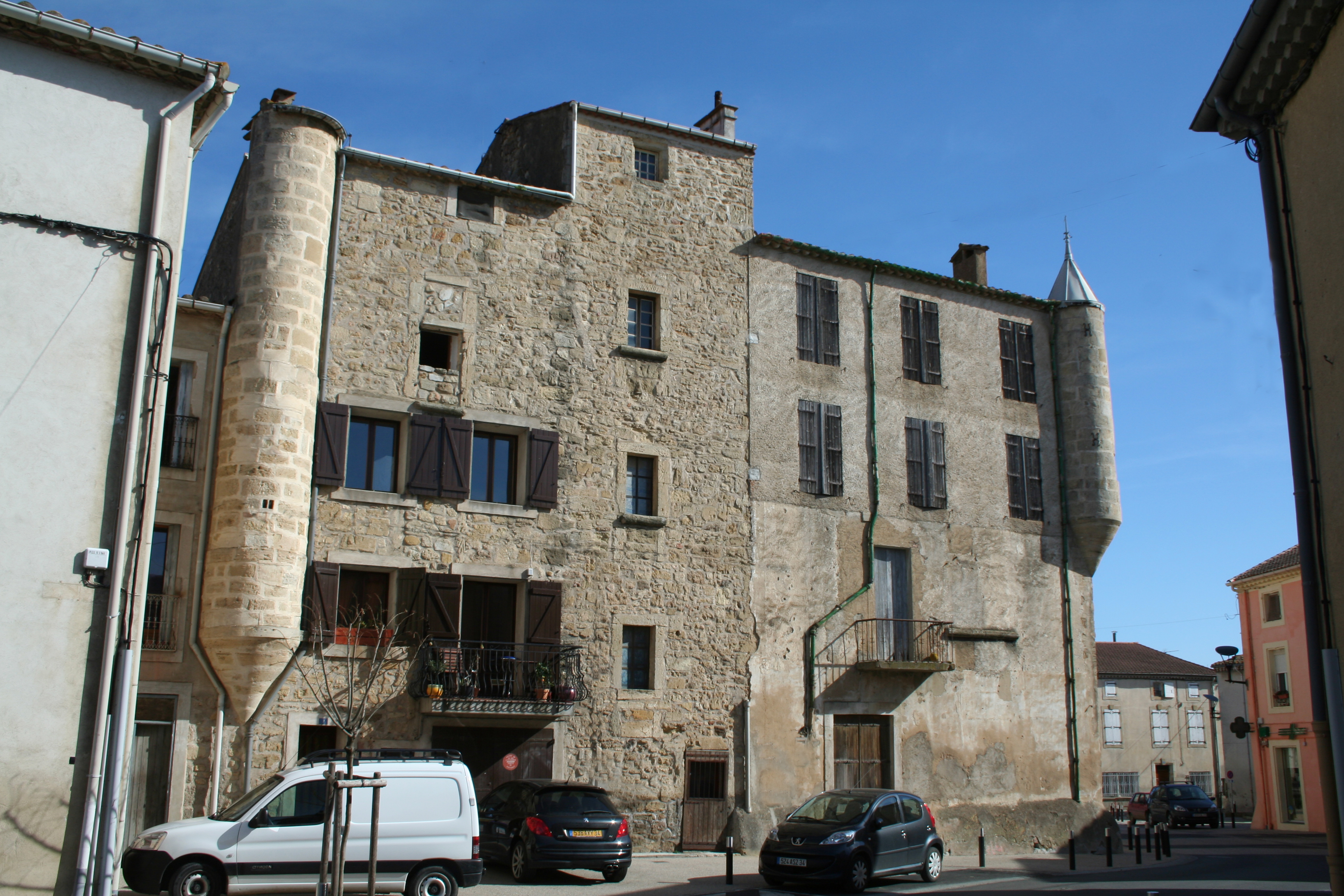
- Castle

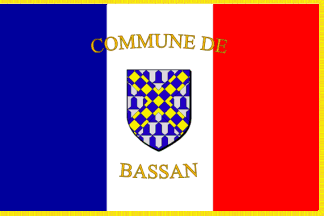
- Flag Coat of arms
- Location of Bassan
- Location within France Location within Occitanie
- Coordinates: 43°24′43″N 3°15′15″E
- Country: France
- Region: Occitania
- Department: Hérault
- Arrondissement: Béziers
- Canton: Béziers-3
- Intercommunality: CA Béziers Méditerranée

Government
  - Mayor (2020–2026): Alain Biola
- Area^{1}: 6.79 km^{2} (2.62 sq mi)
- Highest elevation: 102 m (335 ft)
- Lowest elevation: 53 m (174 ft)
- Population (2023): 2,383
  - Density: 351/km^{2} (909/sq mi)
- Time zone: UTC+01:00 (CET)
  - Summer (DST): UTC+02:00 (CEST)
- INSEE/Postal code: 34025 /34290
- ^{1} French Land Register data, which excludes lakes, ponds, glaciers > 1 km^{2} (0.386 sq mi or 247 acres) and river estuaries.

Bassan (French pronunciation: [basɑ̃]; Occitan: Baçan) is a commune in the Hérault department in the Occitanie region in southern France.

== Population ==
Historical population

Year	Pop.	±% p.a.
1793	307	—
1821	381	+0.77%
1846	461	+0.77%
1872	516	+0.43%
1901	791	+1.48%
1926	743	−0.25%
1946	623	−0.88%
1962	614	−0.09%
1968	735	+3.04%

Year	Pop.	±% p.a.
1975	802	+1.25%
1982	1,097	+4.58%
1990	1,353	+2.66%
1999	1,454	+0.80%
2007	1,548	+0.79%
2012	1,793	+2.98%
2017	2,112	+3.33%
2023	2,383	+2.03%

Source: EHESS and INSEE (1968-2023)

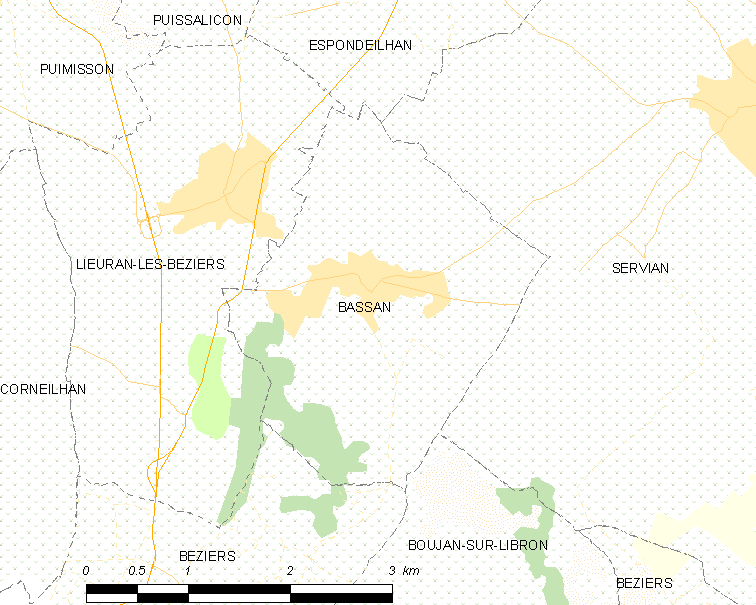

== See also ==
- Communes of the Hérault department
