= Arista (1952 automobile) =

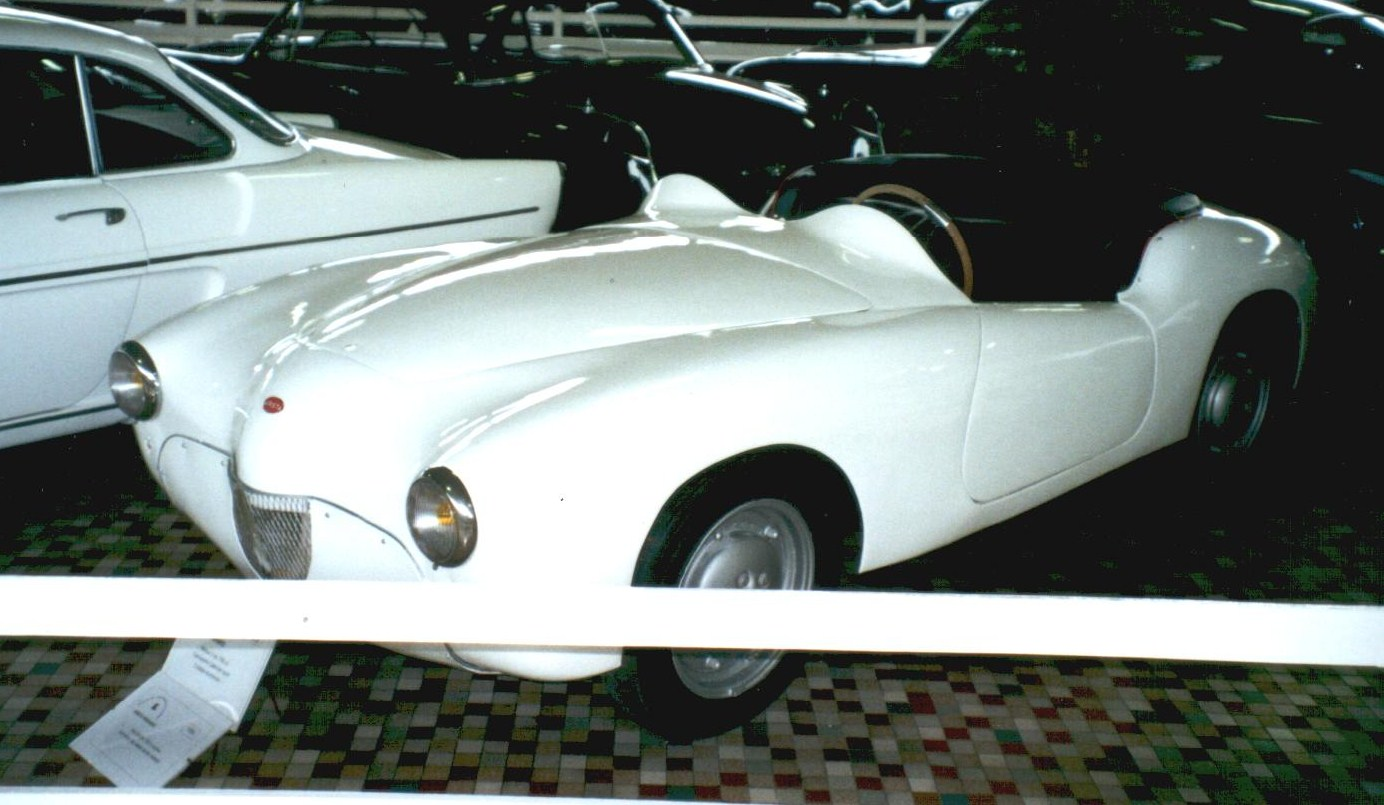
1954 Arista

The Arista was a French automobile with a fiberglass body, produced in Paris from 1952 to 1967.

== Background ==
The firm had been founded in the late 1940s by Antonio Monge and Robert Rowe under the name Callista, but the two fell out over the future direction of the firm after its original project, a sporting model called the "Coupe des Alpes" first seen in prototype form at the 1950 Paris Motor Show, appeared likely to be severely undercut on price when Panhard launched their own Panhard Dyna Junior with a comparable level of performance at a far lower price than Callista could achieve with their low volume production. Monge resolved to return to his former occupation, preparing cars for motor sport events. Shortly after this setback Rowe, who had previously worked as an electrical engineer with the Fulmen business, but who also engaged in other trading activities, was financially ruined after the several hundred Romanian tractors that he imported to France turned out to be defective. At the end of 1952 both the firms founding partners, for their own different reasons, withdrew from the project.

== A new name and a new strategy ==
The enterprise was rescued by Raymond Gaillard, also known in the automotive world as a regular competitor in the Le Mans 24 Hour race. Up to this point Gaillard had figured in the Callista business only as a substantial investor and potential sales distributor for the "Coupe des Alpes" model. Gaillard rescued the residual elements of the business and refounded it under the new name of Arista. From now on the firm concentrated on a smaller lighter and presumably cheaper model called the "Arista Ranelagh". The Ranelagh names came from the (then as now) fashionable Paris street, Rue du Ranelagh where Gaillard owned a Panhard dealership.

Again based on the mechanical components from the Panhard Dyna X, the car was a low cabriolet with long overhangs at each end, reflected in the difference between the 2,130 mm (83.9 in) wheelbase and the 4,100 mm (161.4 in) overall length of the cabriolet model. There was a shorter roadster of only 3,620 mm (142.5 in) in length. The car weighed only 550 / 640 kg (1,213 / 1,411 lb) and a top speed of 135–140 km/h (84–87 mph) was claimed. Both the light weight and the front-wheel-drive layout were determined by the car's Panhard underpinnings.

About 100 were made.

1956 saw the arrival of the Arista Passy, powered by the 42 CV (31 kW) 848 cc engine from the Panhard Dyna Z, and still listed in 1962. A model with the 50 CV (37 kW) "Tigre" engine was sold as the Arista Sport, although the weight savings over a regular PL17 was only about 80 kg (180 lb) due to the car's ample equipment. The little Arista coupé, though stylish, had by now become extremely expensive for a car of this engine size and performance. Sales seem to have slowed to a trickle.

Other Arista designs appeared from time to time, but it is not clear if any others made it to production. Arista had disappeared from view by 1963, although the same business was later involved in making the Sovam sports car.
