= Espondeilhan =

- Commune
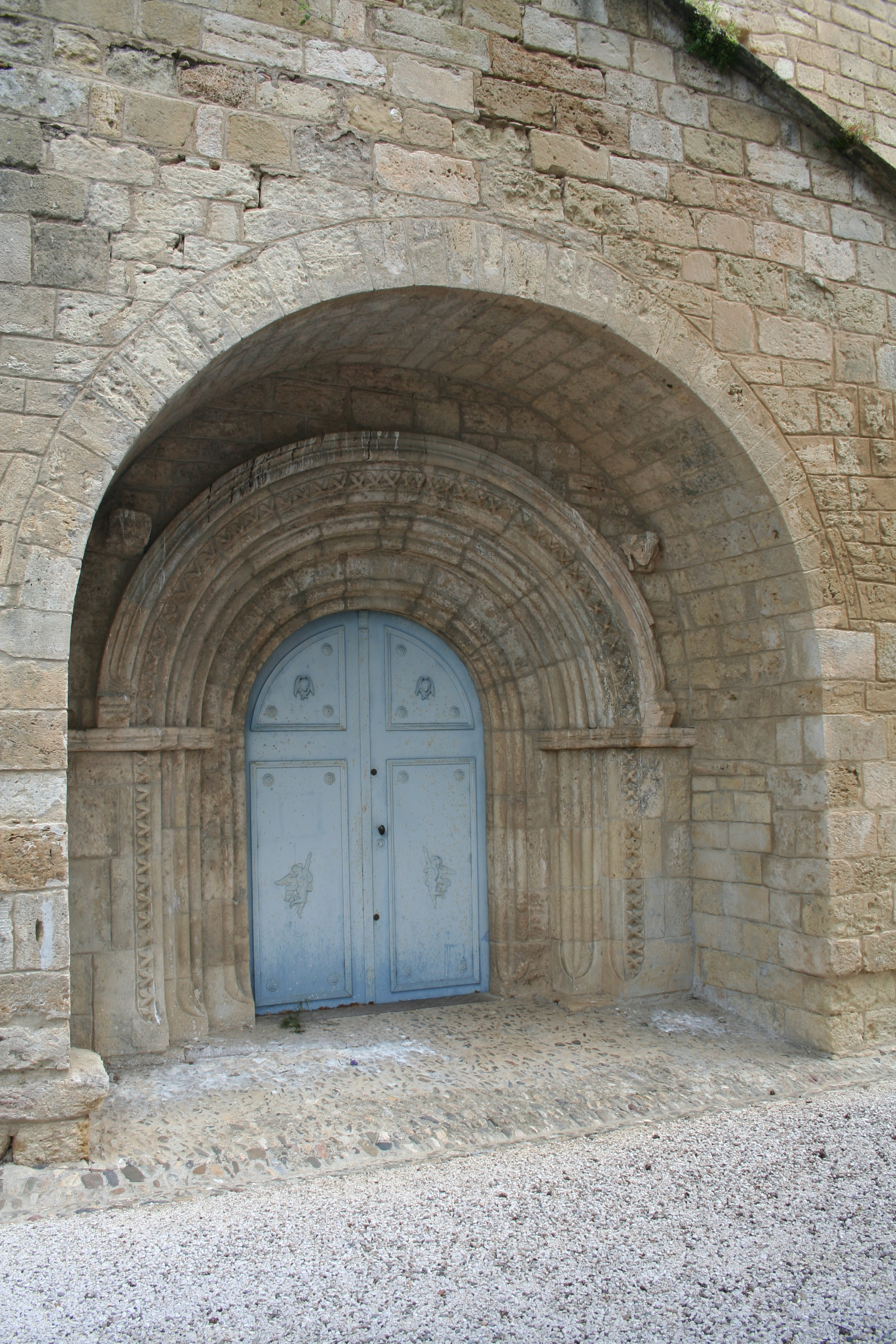
- Notre Dame des Pins

- Coat of arms
- Location of Espondeilhan
- Location within France Location within Occitanie
- Coordinates: 43°26′28″N 3°15′47″E
- Country: France
- Region: Occitania
- Department: Hérault
- Arrondissement: Béziers
- Canton: Béziers-3
- Intercommunality: CA Béziers Méditerranée

Government
  - Mayor (2020–2026): Christophe Llop
- Area^{1}: 5.08 km^{2} (1.96 sq mi)
- Elevation: 60 m (200 ft)
- Highest elevation: 123 m (404 ft)
- Lowest elevation: 60 m (200 ft)
- Population (2023): 1,268
  - Density: 250/km^{2} (646/sq mi)
- Time zone: UTC+01:00 (CET)
  - Summer (DST): UTC+02:00 (CEST)
- INSEE/Postal code: 34094 /34290
- ^{1} French Land Register data, which excludes lakes, ponds, glaciers > 1 km^{2} (0.386 sq mi or 247 acres) and river estuaries.

Espondeilhan (French pronunciation: [ɛspɔ̃dɛjɑ̃]; Occitan: Espondelhan) is a commune in the Hérault department in southern France.

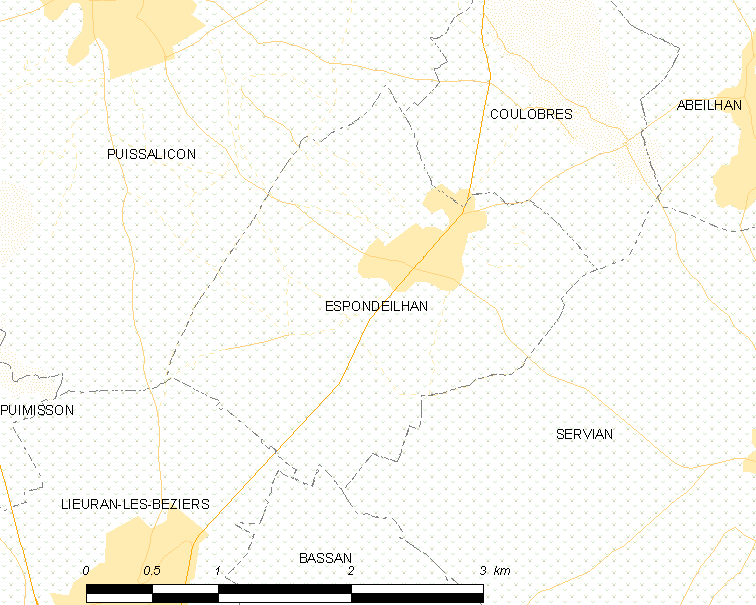
Map

== Population ==
Historical population
Year	Pop.	±% p.a.
1968	354	—
1975	323	−1.30%
1982	356	+1.40%
1990	517	+4.77%
1999	623	+2.09%
2007	898	+4.68%
2012	997	+2.11%
2017	1,033	+0.71%
2023	1,268	+3.48%
Source: INSEE

== See also ==
- Communes of the Hérault department
