= Sauvian =

- Commune
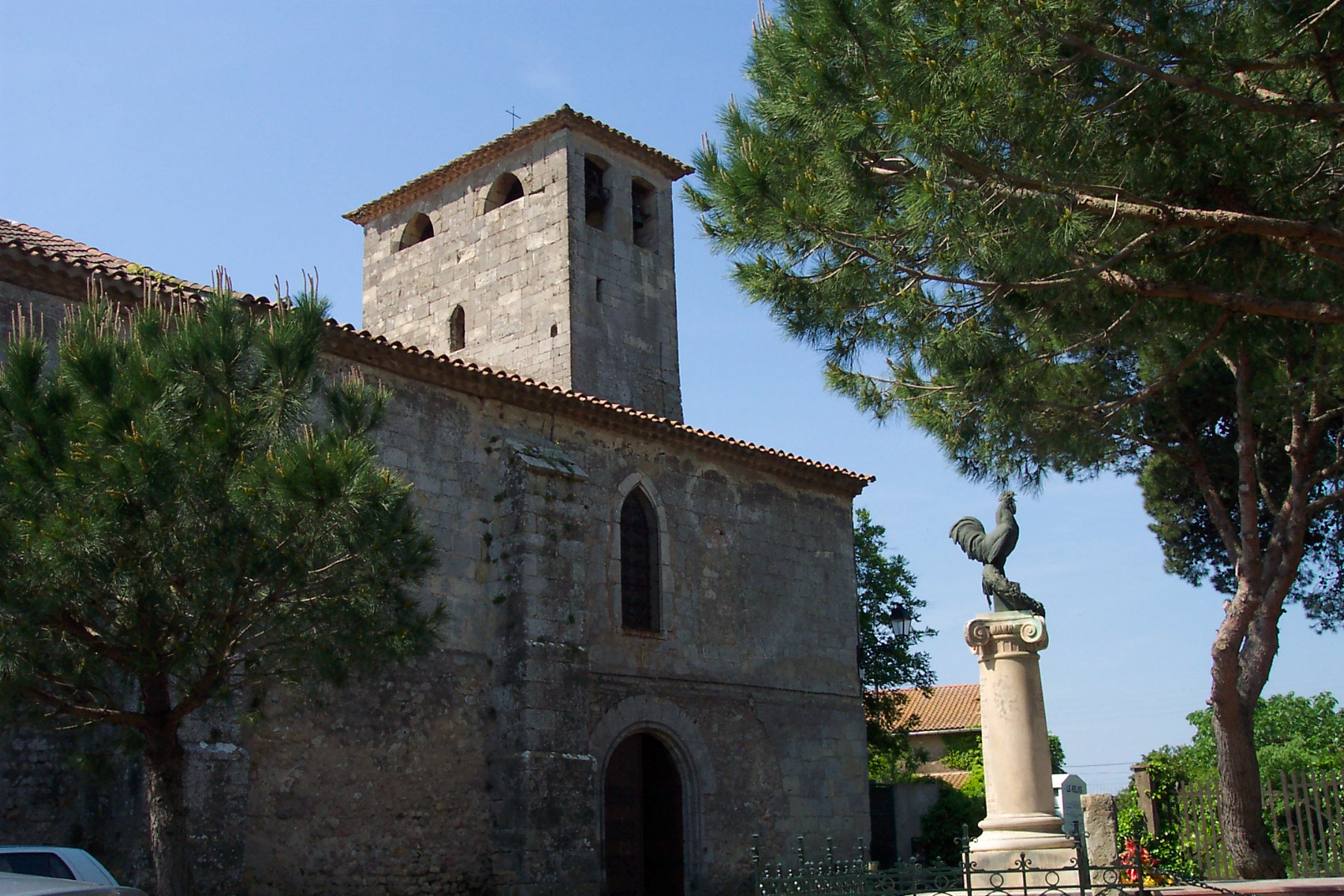
- Saints Cornelius' and Cyprian's church

- Coat of arms
- Location of Sauvian
- Location within France Location within Occitanie
- Coordinates: 43°17′35″N 3°15′40″E
- Country: France
- Region: Occitania
- Department: Hérault
- Arrondissement: Béziers
- Canton: Béziers-3
- Intercommunality: CA Béziers Méditerranée

Government
  - Mayor (2020–2026): Bernard Auriol
- Area^{1}: 13.07 km^{2} (5.05 sq mi)
- Elevation: 4 m (13 ft)
- Highest elevation: 41 m (135 ft)
- Lowest elevation: 3 m (9.8 ft)
- Population (2023): 5,608
  - Density: 429.1/km^{2} (1,111/sq mi)
- Time zone: UTC+01:00 (CET)
  - Summer (DST): UTC+02:00 (CEST)
- INSEE/Postal code: 34298 /34410
- Website: ville-sauvian.com
- ^{1} French Land Register data, which excludes lakes, ponds, glaciers > 1 km^{2} (0.386 sq mi or 247 acres) and river estuaries.

Sauvian (French pronunciation: [sovjɑ̃]) is a commune in the Hérault department in the Occitanie region in southern France.

== Population ==
Historical population
Year	Pop.	±% p.a.
1968	826	—
1975	1,134	+4.63%
1982	2,030	+8.67%
1990	3,178	+5.76%
1999	3,558	+1.26%
2007	4,101	+1.79%
2012	4,470	+1.74%
2017	5,353	+3.67%
2023	5,608	+0.78%
Source: INSEE

== See also ==
- Communes of the Hérault department
