= Boujan-sur-Libron =

- Commune
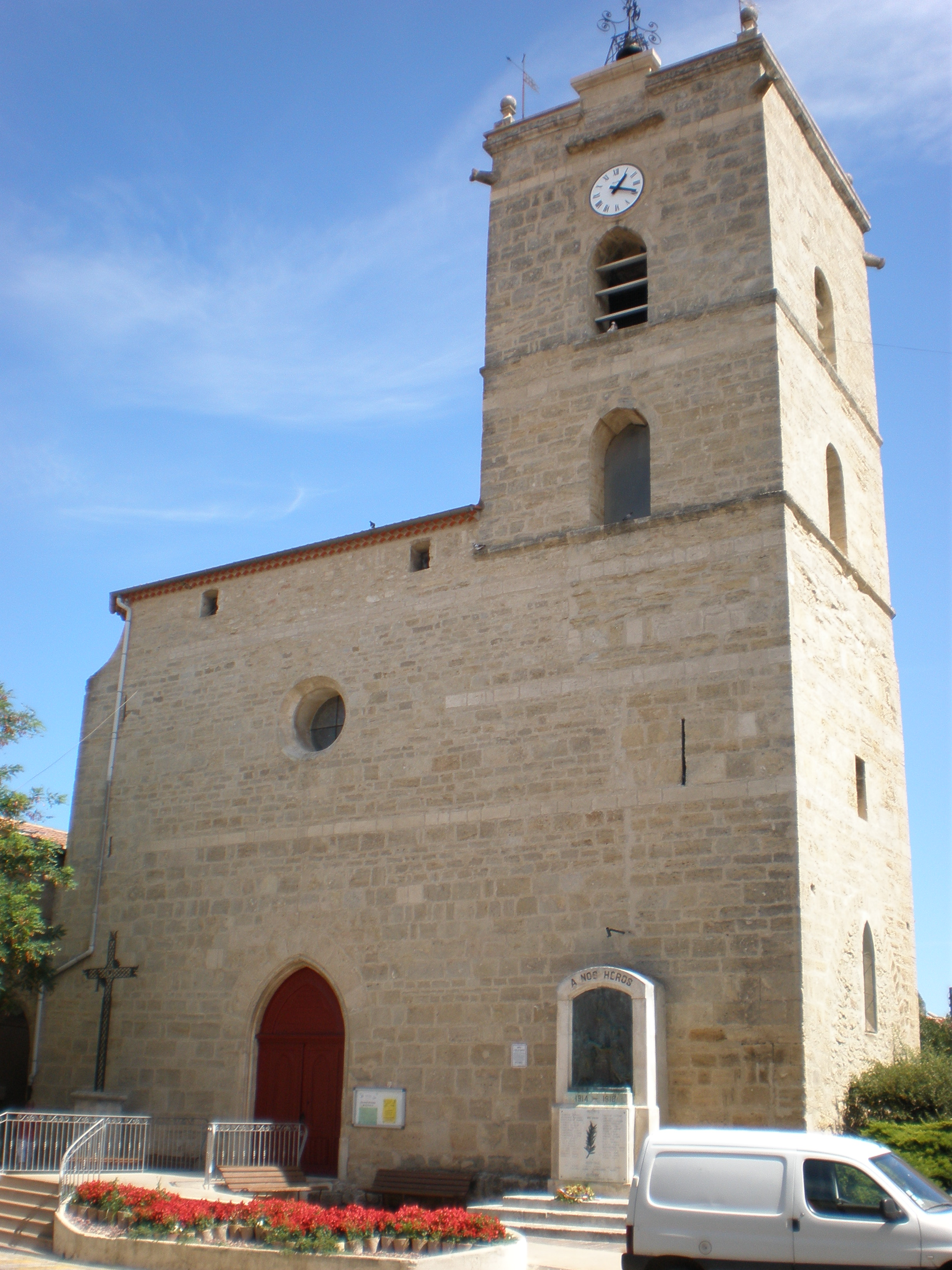
- Church St-Étienne

- Coat of arms
- Location of Boujan-sur-Libron
- Location within France Location within Occitanie
- Coordinates: 43°22′24″N 3°14′59″E
- Country: France
- Region: Occitania
- Department: Hérault
- Arrondissement: Béziers
- Canton: Béziers-3
- Intercommunality: CA Béziers Méditerranée

Government
  - Mayor (2020–2026): Gérard Abella
- Area^{1}: 7.02 km^{2} (2.71 sq mi)
- Elevation: 72 m (236 ft)
- Highest elevation: 106 m (348 ft)
- Lowest elevation: 34 m (112 ft)
- Population (2023): 3,619
  - Density: 516/km^{2} (1,340/sq mi)
- Time zone: UTC+01:00 (CET)
  - Summer (DST): UTC+02:00 (CEST)
- INSEE/Postal code: 34037 /34760
- ^{1} French Land Register data, which excludes lakes, ponds, glaciers > 1 km^{2} (0.386 sq mi or 247 acres) and river estuaries.

Boujan-sur-Libron (French pronunciation: [buʒɑ̃ syʁ libʁɔ̃]; Occitan: Bojan) is a commune in the Hérault department in southern France.

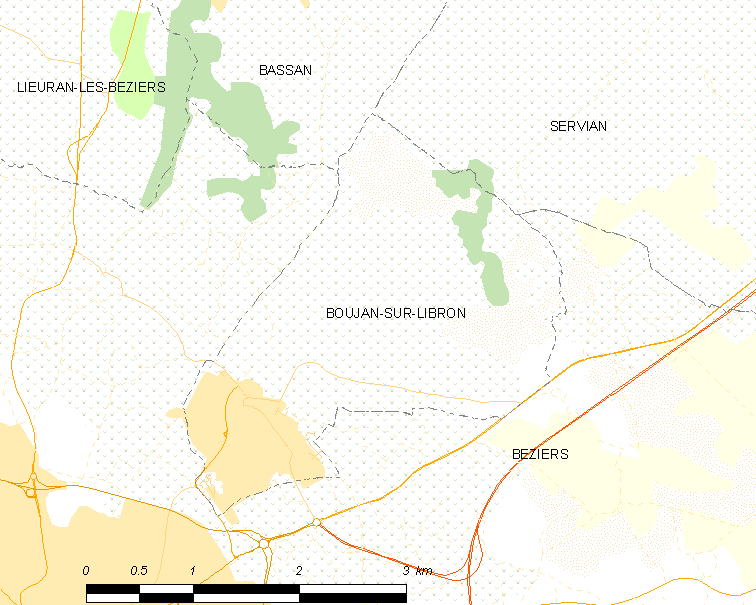
Map

== Population ==
Historical population
Year	Pop.	±% p.a.
1968	1,121	—
1975	1,335	+2.53%
1982	1,843	+4.71%
1990	2,235	+2.44%
1999	2,627	+1.81%
2007	2,944	+1.43%
2012	3,151	+1.37%
2017	3,378	+1.40%
2023	3,619	+1.16%
Source: INSEE

== See also ==
- Communes of the Hérault department
