= Montblanc, Hérault =

Montblanc
- Commune
- Coat of arms
- Location of Montblanc
- Location within France Location within Occitanie
- Coordinates: 43°23′51″N 3°22′04″E
- Country: France
- Region: Occitania
- Department: Hérault
- Arrondissement: Béziers
- Canton: Pézenas
- Intercommunality: CA Béziers Méditerranée

Government
  - Mayor (2020–2026): Claude Allingri
- Area^{1}: 26.94 km^{2} (10.40 sq mi)
- Elevation: 38 m (125 ft)
- Highest elevation: 68 m (223 ft)
- Lowest elevation: 8 m (26 ft)
- Population (2023): 2,932
  - Density: 108.8/km^{2} (281.9/sq mi)
- Time zone: UTC+01:00 (CET)
  - Summer (DST): UTC+02:00 (CEST)
- INSEE/Postal code: 34166 /34290
- ^{1} French Land Register data, which excludes lakes, ponds, glaciers > 1 km^{2} (0.386 sq mi or 247 acres) and river estuaries.

Montblanc (French pronunciation: [mɔ̃blɑ̃]) is a commune in the Hérault department in the Occitanie region in southern France.

Richard Nougier was the mayor of the village from 1989 until his death on April 29, 2016, of a heart attack. The village elected Claude Allingri to finish his term through 2020.

== Population ==
Historical population
| Year | Pop. | ±% p.a. |
|---|---|---|
| 1968 | 1,567 | — |
| 1975 | 1,601 | +0.31% |
| 1982 | 1,643 | +0.37% |
| 1990 | 1,857 | +1.54% |
| 1999 | 2,136 | +1.57% |
| 2007 | 2,486 | +1.91% |
| 2012 | 2,733 | +1.91% |
| 2017 | 2,848 | +0.83% |
| 2023 | 2,932 | +0.49% |
Source: INSEE

== International relations ==
- Montblanc, Spain

== See also ==
- Communes of the Hérault department
