= Canton of Pézenas =

Coordinates: 43.46°N 3.42°E

Pézenas
- Canton
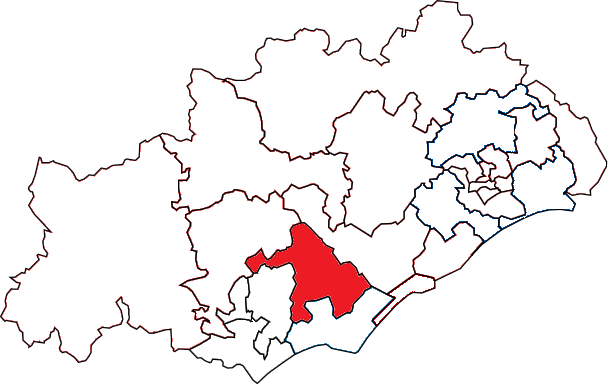
- Interactive map of Pézenas
- Country: France
- Region: Occitania
- Department: Hérault
- No. of communes: {{{nbcomm}}}

Government
  - Representatives (2021–2028): Julie Garcin Saudo; Vincent Gaudy
- Area: 245.92 km^{2} (94.95 sq mi)
- Population (2023): 38,094
  - Density: 154.90/km^{2} (401.20/sq mi)
- INSEE code: 34 21

The canton of Pézenas is an administrative division of the Hérault department, southern France. Its borders were modified at the French canton reorganisation which came into effect in March 2015. Its seat is in Pézenas.

== Composition ==
It consists of the following communes:

1. Abeilhan
2. Alignan-du-Vent
3. Castelnau-de-Guers
4. Caux
5. Coulobres
6. Florensac
7. Montblanc
8. Nézignan-l'Évêque
9. Pézenas
10. Pinet
11. Pomérols
12. Puissalicon
13. Saint-Thibéry
14. Tourbes
15. Valros

== Councillors ==
| Election | Councillors | Party | Occupation |
|---|---|---|---|
| 2015 | Julie Garcin Saudo | PS | Councillor of Pézenas |
| 2015 | Vincent Gaudy | PS | Mayor of Florensac |
| 2021 | Julie Garcin Saudo | PS | Councillor of Pézenas |
| 2021 | Vincent Gaudy | PS | Mayor of Florensac |

== Pictures of the canton ==
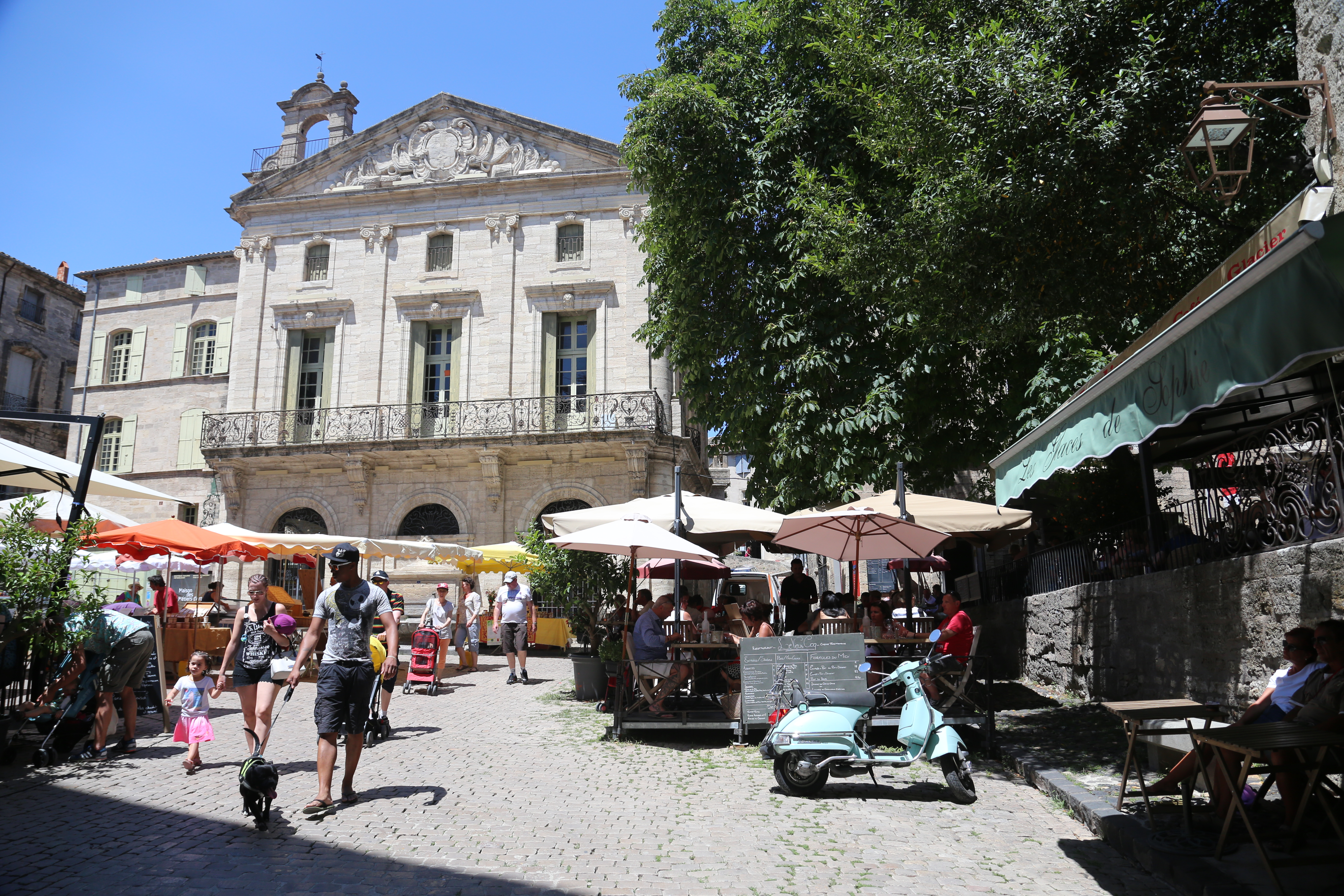
Gambetta square in Pézenas

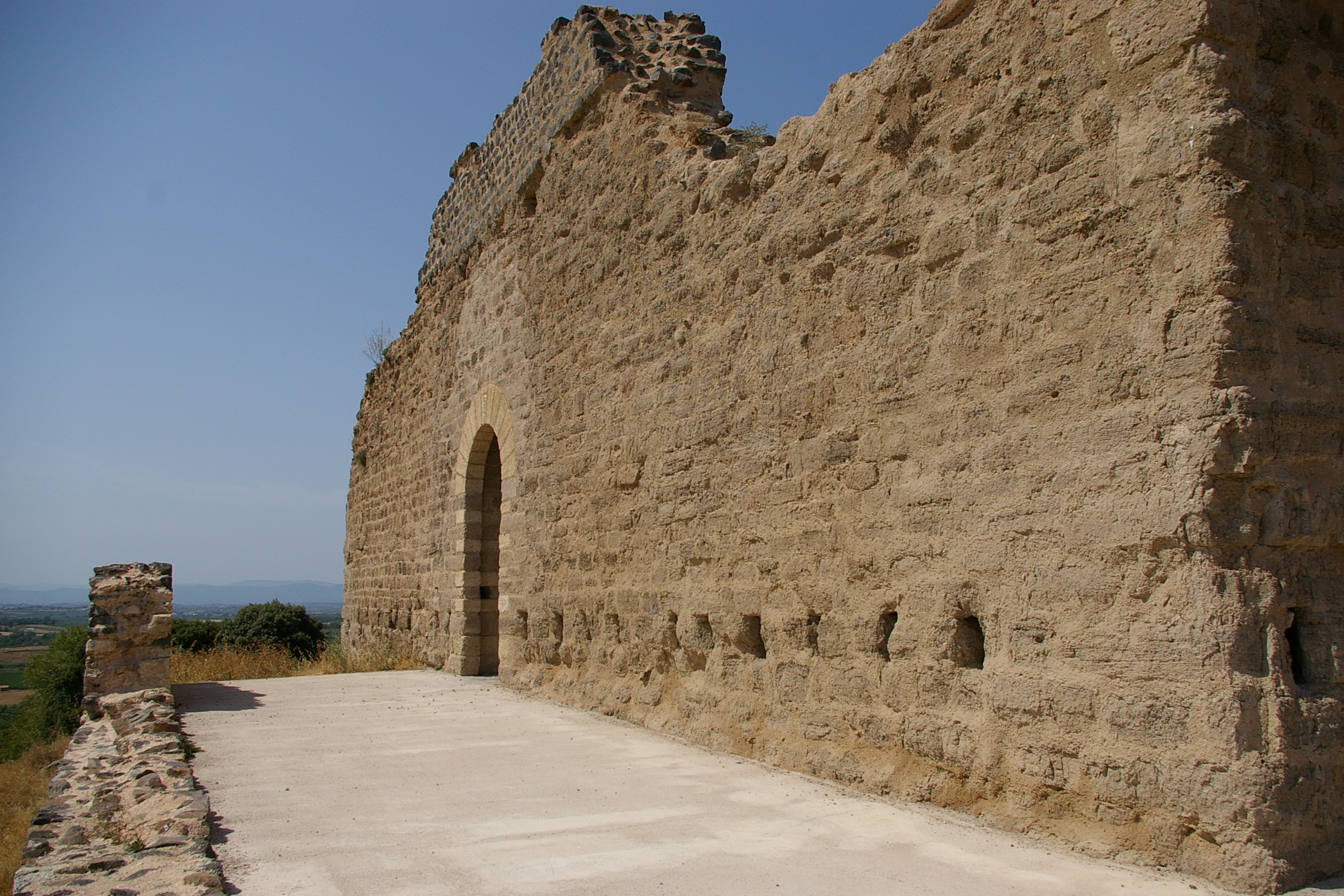
The Fort de Valros

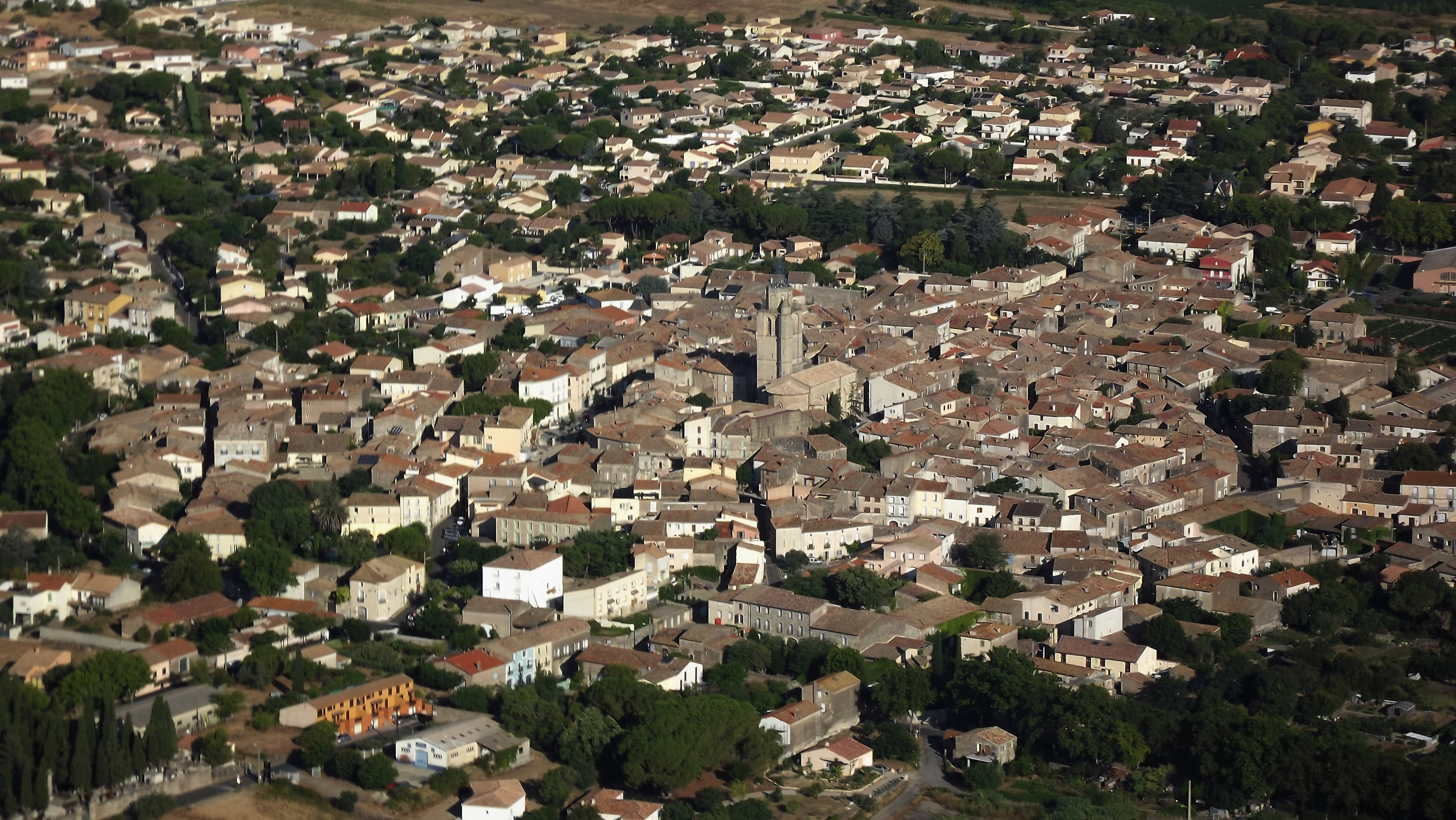
View of Caux Circulade
