= Pomérols =

- Commune
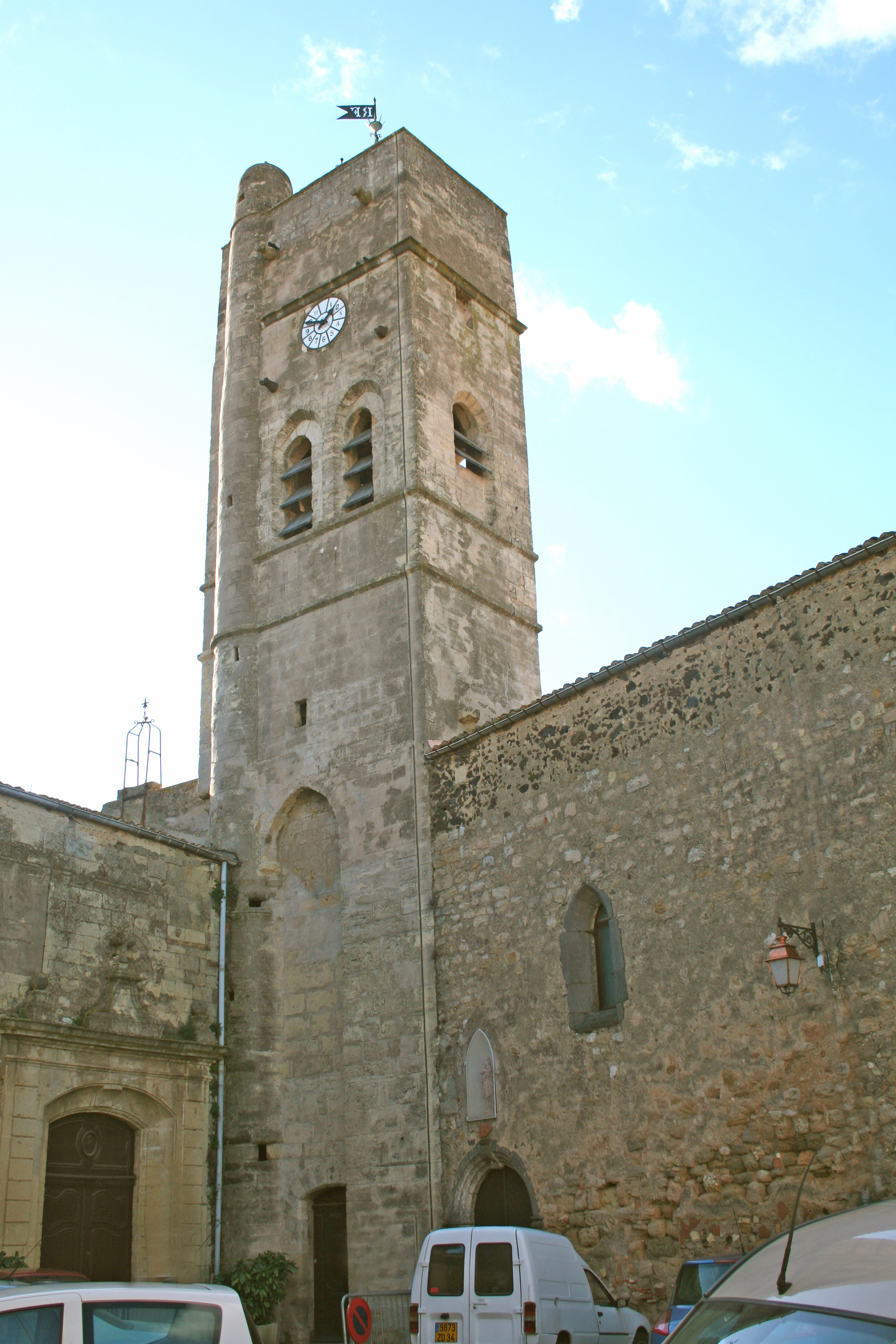
- The church of Saint-Cyr-et-Sainte-Julitte

- Coat of arms
- Location of Pomérols
- Location within France Location within Occitanie
- Coordinates: 43°23′29″N 3°29′58″E
- Country: France
- Region: Occitania
- Department: Hérault
- Arrondissement: Béziers
- Canton: Pézenas
- Intercommunality: CA Hérault Méditerranée

Government
  - Mayor (2020–2026): Laurent Durban
- Area^{1}: 11.01 km^{2} (4.25 sq mi)
- Highest elevation: 68 m (223 ft)
- Lowest elevation: 1 m (3.3 ft)
- Population (2023): 2,299
  - Density: 208.8/km^{2} (540.8/sq mi)
- Time zone: UTC+01:00 (CET)
  - Summer (DST): UTC+02:00 (CEST)
- INSEE/Postal code: 34207 /34810
- ^{1} French Land Register data, which excludes lakes, ponds, glaciers > 1 km^{2} (0.386 sq mi or 247 acres) and river estuaries.

Pomérols (French pronunciation: [pɔmeʁɔl]; Occitan: Pomeiròus) is a commune in the Hérault department in the Occitanie region in southern France.

== Population ==
Historical population
Year	Pop.	±% p.a.
1968	1,195	—
1975	1,125	−0.86%
1982	1,180	+0.68%
1990	1,584	+3.75%
1999	1,696	+0.76%
2007	2,041	+2.34%
2012	2,216	+1.66%
2017	2,293	+0.69%
2023	2,299	+0.04%
Source: INSEE

== See also ==
- Communes of the Hérault department
