= Abeilhan =

- Commune
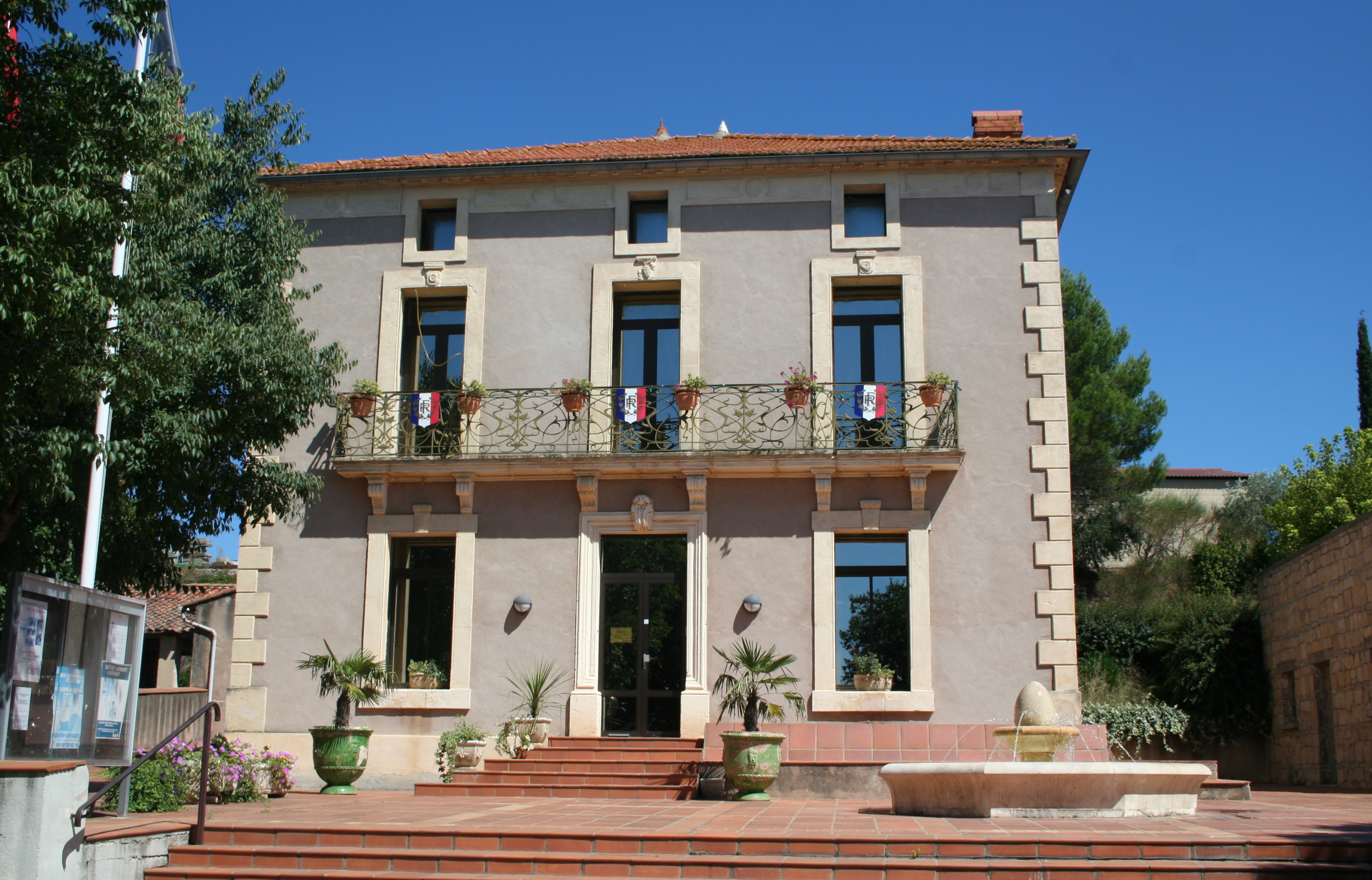
- Town hall

- Coat of arms
- Location of Abeilhan
- Location within France Location within Occitanie
- Coordinates: 43°27′02″N 3°17′43″E
- Country: France
- Region: Occitania
- Department: Hérault
- Arrondissement: Béziers
- Canton: Pézenas
- Intercommunality: Les Avant-Monts

Government
  - Mayor (2020–2026): Pierre-Jean Rougeot
- Area^{1}: 7.81 km^{2} (3.02 sq mi)
- Elevation: 74 m (243 ft)
- Highest elevation: 105 m (344 ft)
- Lowest elevation: 43 m (141 ft)
- Population (2023): 1,850
  - Density: 237/km^{2} (614/sq mi)
- Demonym(s): Abeilhanais, Abeilhanaises
- Time zone: UTC+01:00 (CET)
  - Summer (DST): UTC+02:00 (CEST)
- INSEE/Postal code: 34001 /34290
- ^{1} French Land Register data, which excludes lakes, ponds, glaciers > 1 km^{2} (0.386 sq mi or 247 acres) and river estuaries.

Abeilhan (French pronunciation: [abɛjɑ̃]; Occitan: Abelhan) is a commune in the Hérault department in the Occitanie region in southern France.

== Population ==
Historical population

Year	Pop.	±% p.a.
1793	573	—
1800	647	+1.75%
1806	715	+1.68%
1821	771	+0.50%
1831	805	+0.43%
1836	814	+0.22%
1841	854	+0.96%
1846	807	−1.13%
1851	811	+0.10%
1856	795	−0.40%
1861	845	+1.23%
1866	835	−0.24%
1872	824	−0.22%
1876	859	+1.05%
1881	675	−4.71%
1886	630	−1.37%
1891	747	+3.47%
1896	813	+1.71%
1901	937	+2.88%

Year	Pop.	±% p.a.
1906	871	−1.45%
1911	887	+0.36%
1921	1,022	+1.43%
1926	959	−1.26%
1931	1,002	+0.88%
1936	945	−1.16%
1946	714	−2.76%
1954	718	+0.07%
1962	727	+0.16%
1968	762	+0.79%
1975	771	+0.17%
1982	810	+0.71%
1990	917	+1.56%
1999	979	+0.73%
2007	1,254	+3.14%
2012	1,493	+3.55%
2017	1,705	+2.69%
2023	1,850	+1.37%

Source: EHESS (1793-1999) and INSEE

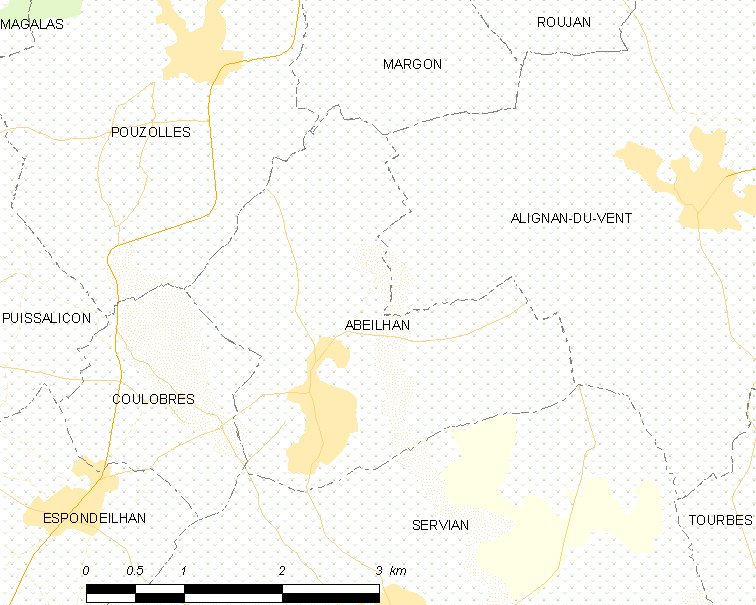
Map

== See also ==
- Communes of the Hérault department
