= Tourbes =

- Commune
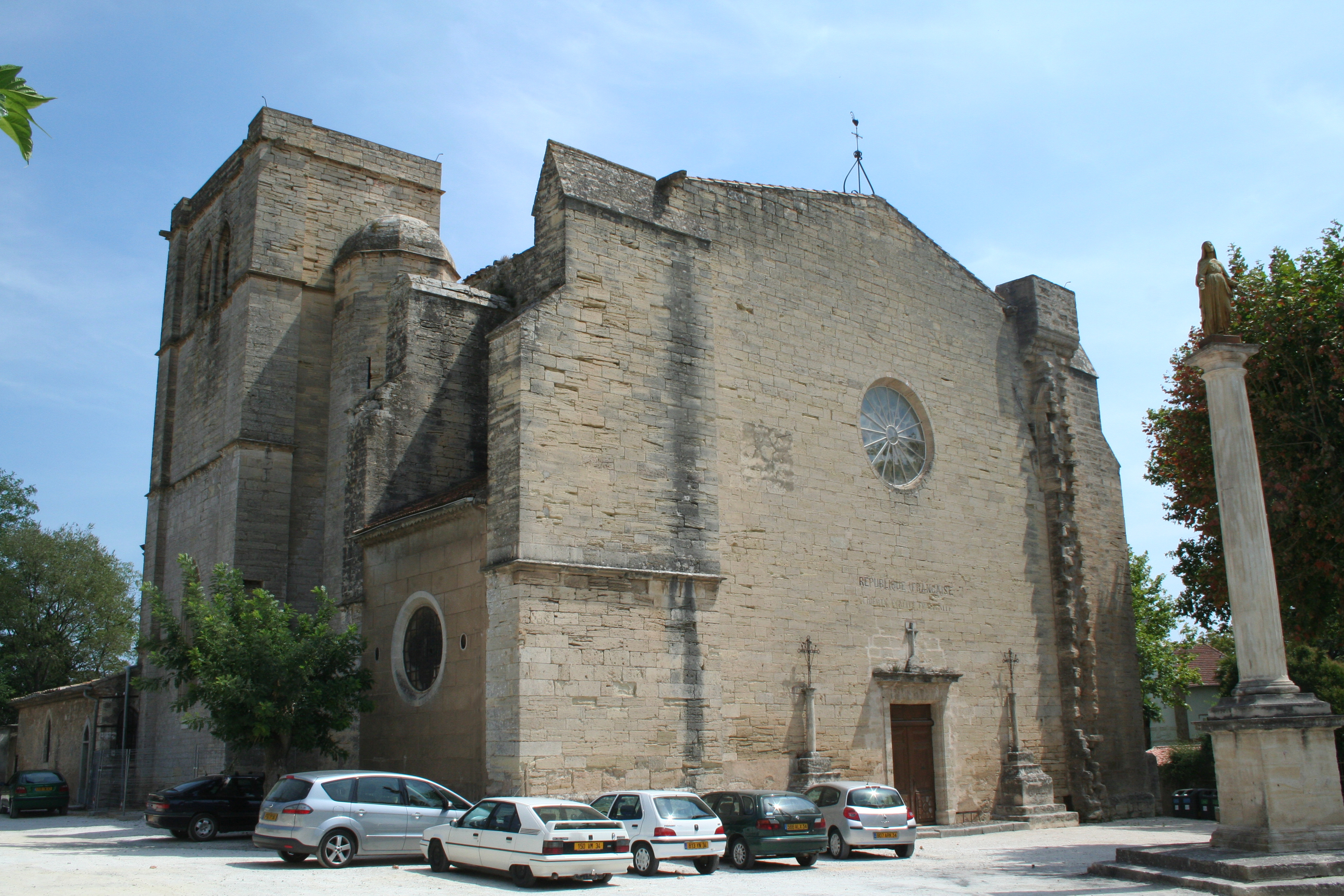
- The church of Tourbes

- Coat of arms
- Location of Tourbes
- Location within France Location within Occitanie
- Coordinates: 43°26′48″N 3°22′46″E
- Country: France
- Region: Occitania
- Department: Hérault
- Arrondissement: Béziers
- Canton: Pézenas
- Intercommunality: CA Hérault Méditerranée

Government
  - Mayor (2020–2026): Lionel Puche
- Area^{1}: 15.96 km^{2} (6.16 sq mi)
- Elevation: 50 m (160 ft)
- Highest elevation: 103 m (338 ft)
- Lowest elevation: 11 m (36 ft)
- Population (2023): 1,936
  - Density: 121.3/km^{2} (314.2/sq mi)
- Time zone: UTC+01:00 (CET)
  - Summer (DST): UTC+02:00 (CEST)
- INSEE/Postal code: 34311 /34120
- ^{1} French Land Register data, which excludes lakes, ponds, glaciers > 1 km^{2} (0.386 sq mi or 247 acres) and river estuaries.

Tourbes (French pronunciation: [tuʁb]; Occitan: Torbes) is a commune in the Hérault department in the Occitanie region in southern France.

== Geography ==
=== Climate ===
Tourbes has a mediterranean climate (Köppen climate classification Csa). The average annual temperature in Tourbes is 14.9 °C (58.8 °F). The average annual rainfall is 631.5 mm (24.86 in) with October as the wettest month. The temperatures are highest on average in July, at around 23.3 °C (73.9 °F), and lowest in January, at around 7.7 °C (45.9 °F). The highest temperature ever recorded in Tourbes was 43.0 °C (109.4 °F) on 28 June 2019; the coldest temperature ever recorded was −10.1 °C (13.8 °F) on 22 November 1998.

Climate data for Tourbes (1981–2010 averages, extremes 1993−present)
Month	Jan	Feb	Mar	Apr	May	Jun	Jul	Aug	Sep	Oct	Nov	Dec	Year
Record high °C (°F)	21.6 (70.9)	24.4 (75.9)	27.8 (82.0)	31.9 (89.4)	34.5 (94.1)	43.0 (109.4)	38.1 (100.6)	39.5 (103.1)	36.2 (97.2)	32.8 (91.0)	25.8 (78.4)	21.4 (70.5)	43.0 (109.4)
Mean daily maximum °C (°F)	11.9 (53.4)	13.0 (55.4)	16.3 (61.3)	18.7 (65.7)	22.5 (72.5)	27.1 (80.8)	29.6 (85.3)	29.3 (84.7)	24.9 (76.8)	20.6 (69.1)	15.4 (59.7)	12.2 (54.0)	20.2 (68.4)
Daily mean °C (°F)	7.7 (45.9)	8.2 (46.8)	10.9 (51.6)	13.5 (56.3)	17.1 (62.8)	20.9 (69.6)	23.3 (73.9)	23.1 (73.6)	19.0 (66.2)	15.8 (60.4)	10.9 (51.6)	7.8 (46.0)	14.9 (58.8)
Mean daily minimum °C (°F)	3.4 (38.1)	3.4 (38.1)	5.5 (41.9)	8.2 (46.8)	11.7 (53.1)	14.8 (58.6)	16.9 (62.4)	16.8 (62.2)	13.1 (55.6)	11.0 (51.8)	6.3 (43.3)	3.4 (38.1)	9.6 (49.3)
Record low °C (°F)	−8.5 (16.7)	−8.1 (17.4)	−9.8 (14.4)	−2.0 (28.4)	2.7 (36.9)	6.4 (43.5)	6.9 (44.4)	6.0 (42.8)	4.1 (39.4)	−2.1 (28.2)	−10.1 (13.8)	−8.5 (16.7)	−10.1 (13.8)
Average precipitation mm (inches)	61.7 (2.43)	55.6 (2.19)	29.8 (1.17)	54.2 (2.13)	51.6 (2.03)	27.1 (1.07)	16.4 (0.65)	29.6 (1.17)	69.1 (2.72)	91.2 (3.59)	79.0 (3.11)	66.2 (2.61)	631.5 (24.86)
Average precipitation days (≥ 1.0 mm)	6.4	4.4	4.2	5.5	6.4	3.3	2.2	3.4	5.3	6.6	6.6	5.4	59.6
Source: Meteociel

== Population ==
Historical population
Year	Pop.	±% p.a.
1968	767	—
1975	740	−0.51%
1982	833	+1.71%
1990	1,022	+2.59%
1999	1,276	+2.50%
2007	1,446	+1.58%
2012	1,529	+1.12%
2017	1,621	+1.18%
2023	1,936	+3.00%
Source: INSEE

== See also ==
- Communes of the Hérault department
