= Nézignan-l'Évêque =

- Commune
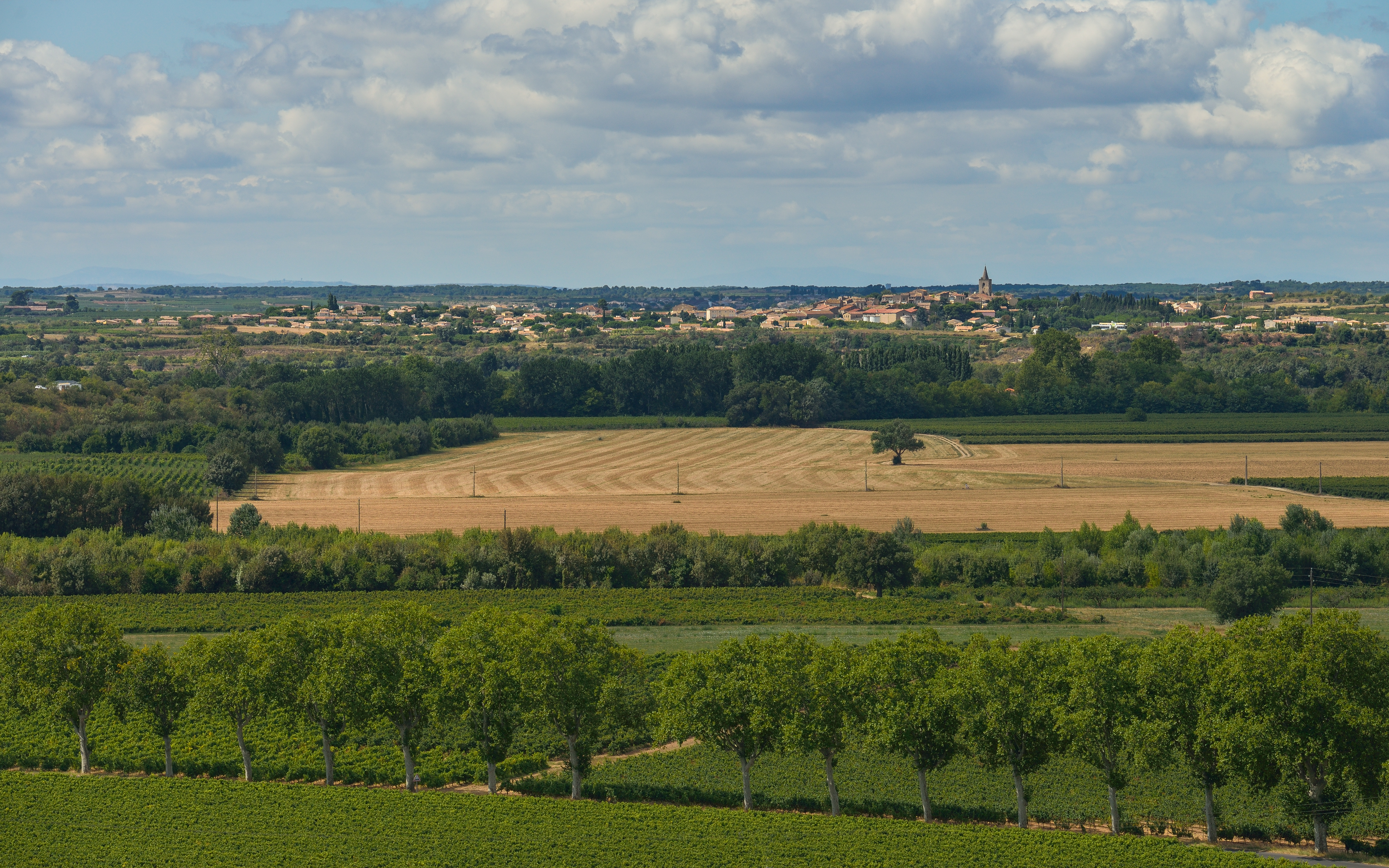
- A general view of Nézignan-l'Évêque

- Coat of arms
- Location of Nézignan-l'Évêque
- Location within France Location within Occitanie
- Coordinates: 43°25′20″N 3°24′25″E
- Country: France
- Region: Occitania
- Department: Hérault
- Arrondissement: Béziers
- Canton: Pézenas
- Intercommunality: CA Hérault Méditerranée

Government
  - Mayor (2020–2026): Edgard Sicard
- Area^{1}: 4.33 km^{2} (1.67 sq mi)
- Elevation: 40 m (130 ft)
- Highest elevation: 74 m (243 ft)
- Lowest elevation: 7 m (23 ft)
- Population (2023): 1,718
  - Density: 397/km^{2} (1,030/sq mi)
- Time zone: UTC+01:00 (CET)
  - Summer (DST): UTC+02:00 (CEST)
- INSEE/Postal code: 34182 /34120
- ^{1} French Land Register data, which excludes lakes, ponds, glaciers > 1 km^{2} (0.386 sq mi or 247 acres) and river estuaries.

Nézignan-l'Évêque (French pronunciation: [neziɲɑ̃ levɛk]; Occitan: Nesinhan de l'Avesque) is a commune in the Hérault department in the Occitanie region in southern France.

== Population ==
Historical population
Year	Pop.	±% p.a.
1968	612	—
1975	642	+0.69%
1982	725	+1.75%
1990	753	+0.47%
1999	960	+2.74%
2007	1,301	+3.87%
2012	1,687	+5.33%
2017	1,820	+1.53%
2023	1,718	−0.96%
Source: INSEE

== Sights ==
- Arboretum du Figuier
- Church of Saint Marie-Madeleine (Église Sainte-Marie-Madeleine de Nézignan-l'Évêque)

== See also ==
- Communes of the Hérault department
