= Arboretum du Figuier =

Arboretum of fig trees in Languedoc-Roussillon, France

Coordinates: 43.42°N 3.407°E

The Arboretum du Figuier is an experimental arboretum of fig trees located in Nézignan-l'Évêque, Hérault, Languedoc-Roussillon, France. The town has a historical reputation for its figs dating to the Middle Ages, as evidenced by a painting of the time of Francis I in which the inhabitants serve as standard-bearer for the fig. Today's villagers are still known as bécos figos (fig eaters). The arboretum has been recently created and is variously described as containing over 80 varieties of fig trees, or 97 trees representing 40 varieties.

== See also ==
- List of botanical gardens in France
