= Léon Azéma =

French architect (1888–1978)

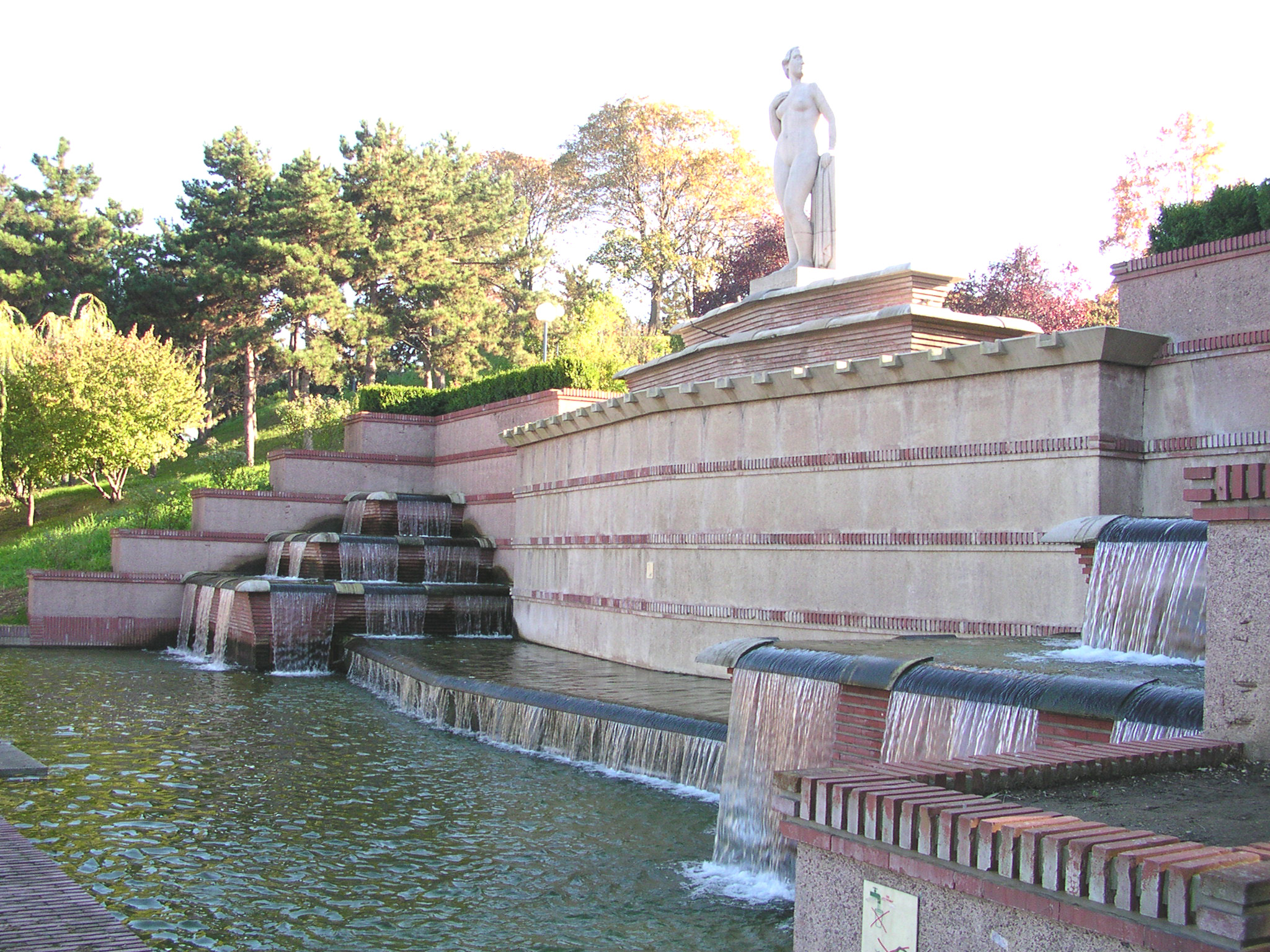
The buffet-d'eau of the square de la Butte-du-Chapeau-Rouge (1938)

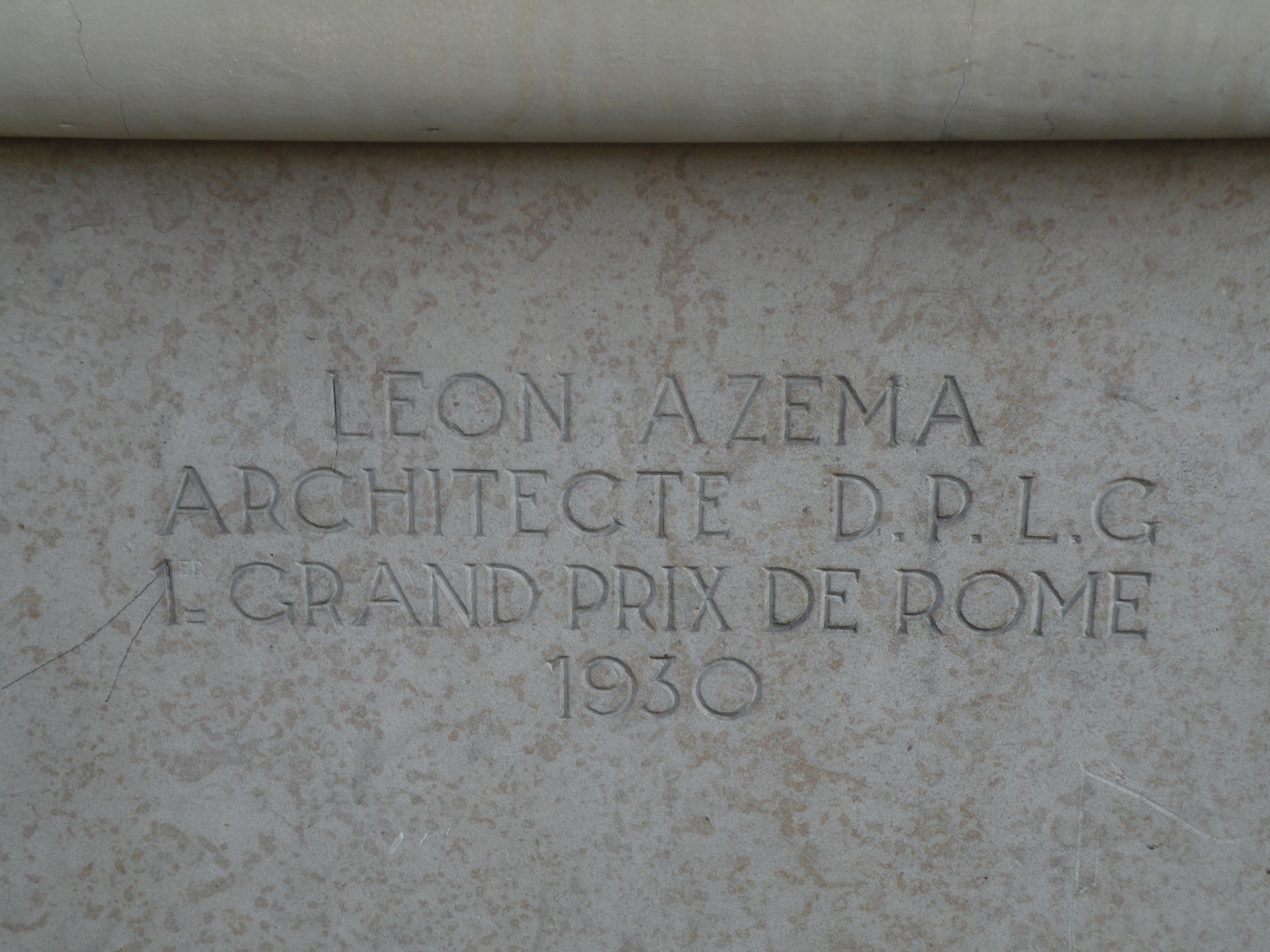
Detail on the building at 91–93 quai d'Orsay in Paris

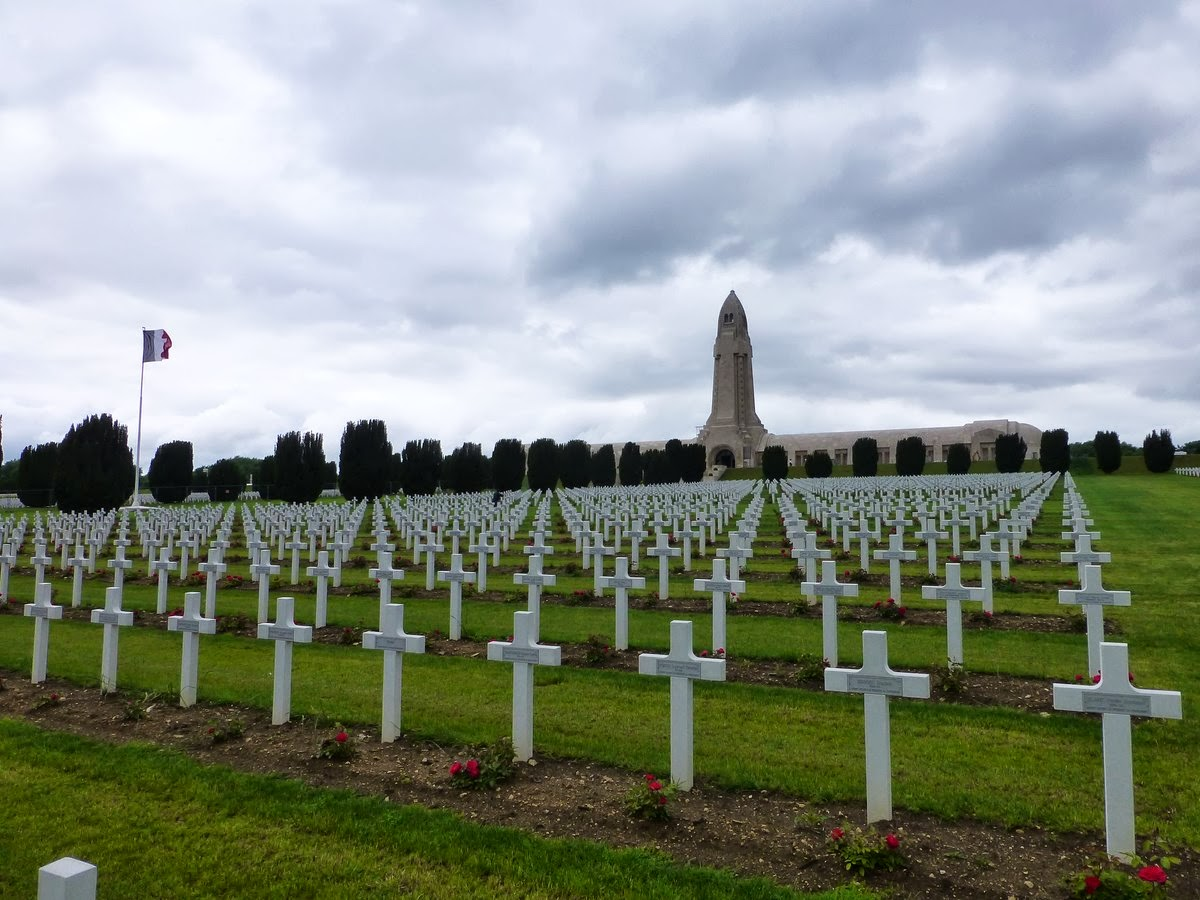
Douaumont ossuary

Léon Azéma (20 January 1888 – 1 March 1978) was a French architect. He is responsible for many public works in France, especially in and around Paris. His most famous work is 1937 Palais de Chaillot, facing the Eiffel Tower in Paris.

== Early career ==
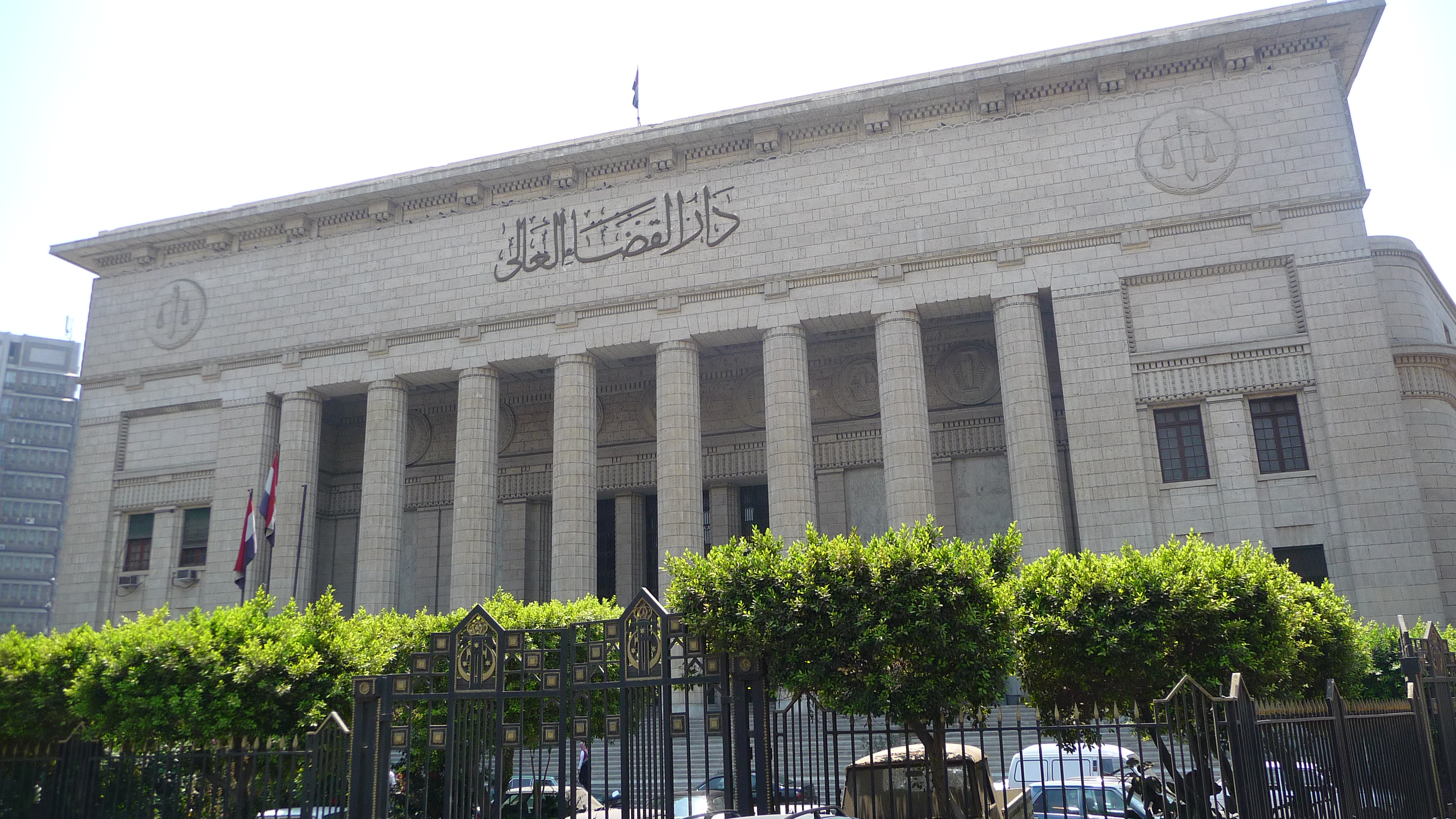
Palace of Justice, Cairo (then the Mixed Courts).

Azéma was born in Alignan-du-Vent in the Hérault department of southern France. His parents were viticulturists ruined by Phylloxera, and were unable to fund their son's studies, so he moved to Paris in 1902 and entered the École nationale supérieure des Beaux-Arts as an apprentice, where he studied under Gaston Redon.

In 1912, he was called to military service. He was seriously wounded at Charleroi during the First World War and taken prisoner. He spent five years in German captivity but his artistic ability was appreciated by his captors, who provided him with paper and pencils.

He returned to France in 1919 and rejoined the École des Beaux-Arts. He won first prize in the Prix de Rome in 1921, and the international competition for the construction of the Palace of Justice in Cairo. He built several buildings in Alexandria with the College of Christian Schools and the Collège Saint-Marc. In 1922 he presented a project to rebuild the Labyrinth of Thebes in Karnak.

== Douaumont ossuary ==
On his return to France, he was appointed professor at the École des Beaux-Arts. In 1923, he won the contest for Douaumont ossuary, which reflects his admiration for Roman art and stone building construction, and was completed in 1932. It houses the bones of at least 130,000 unidentified soldiers of both sides. The jury was impressed by the functional qualities of the design. Azéma often travelled to visit the site during the rest of his career.

== Architect of the City of Paris ==
Appointed Architect of the City of Paris in 1928, Azéma designed the restoration of the park of Sceaux. He reconstructed the Pavilion of Hanover in 1932 and in 1934–1935 he rebuilt waterfalls created by André Le Nôtre and destroyed in the French Revolution.

In Paris, he created the squares of the green belt and that of Saint-Julien-le-Pauvre (1930–1935) and the sports fields of the ASPS in 1937. In 1938, work started on his design for the Parc de la Butte du Chapeau Rouge in the 19th arrondissement, which was then completed by his son Jean. Between 1933 and 1935, he built the church of Saint Anthony of Padua in the 15th arrondissement. His work for the Parc des Expositions (exhibition ground) at the Porte de Versailles included office buildings, medical service and, in 1937, with Louis-Hippolyte Boileau, the entrance to the Park.

At the Brussels World Fair of 1935, he designed the Pavillon de la Ville de Paris. In 1936, together with Maurice Mantout, he built the Franco-Muslim Avicenna hospital in Bobigny.

With Jacques Carlu and Louis-Hippolyte Boileau, he won the competition for the construction of the Palais de Chaillot on the occasion of the 1937 Paris World's Fair.

Azéma was a professor at the Ecole nationale supérieure des Postes, Télégraphes et Téléphones, and on 8 August 1928 was appointed architect to the French postal service. He created the stamp museum in Paris as well as many post offices: Paris 1, in 1933, Paris 5 1933, Paris 8 and the sorting office at Paris Saint-Lazare in 1938, the Roquette Voltaire central office, Paris 20 then throughout France: Vichy in 1935, Bagneux, the Centre national d'études des télécommunications (CNET) in 1937, Argenteuil in 1940, Garches in 1941, Marseille in 1959, Strasbourg, the Centre for Giro and the telephone exchange in 1961, Charleville, Malesherbes, Chaumont, the gare de Troyes, and a water tower at Bordeaux. He finished his career with the Postal service on 31 December 1953.

== Architect of the ORTF ==
After retiring from the postal service, Azéma became the architect of the Office de Radiodiffusion Télévision Française (ORTF). At 65, he participated in the contest to design the Maison de la Radio in the 16th arrondissement of Paris. He was also responsible for the restoration of the Quai Conti Mint until 1978.

== Personal life ==
An amateur painter, Azéma produced numerous works including several views of Parthenay (Deux-Sèvres), his wife's birthplace. He designed his villa in Sainte-Maxime sur Mer and his home in Bourg-la-Reine (4 avenue Aristide Briand), where he lived from 1939. He died in Épernay on 1 March 1978 and is buried in the town cemetery.
