= Valros =

- Commune
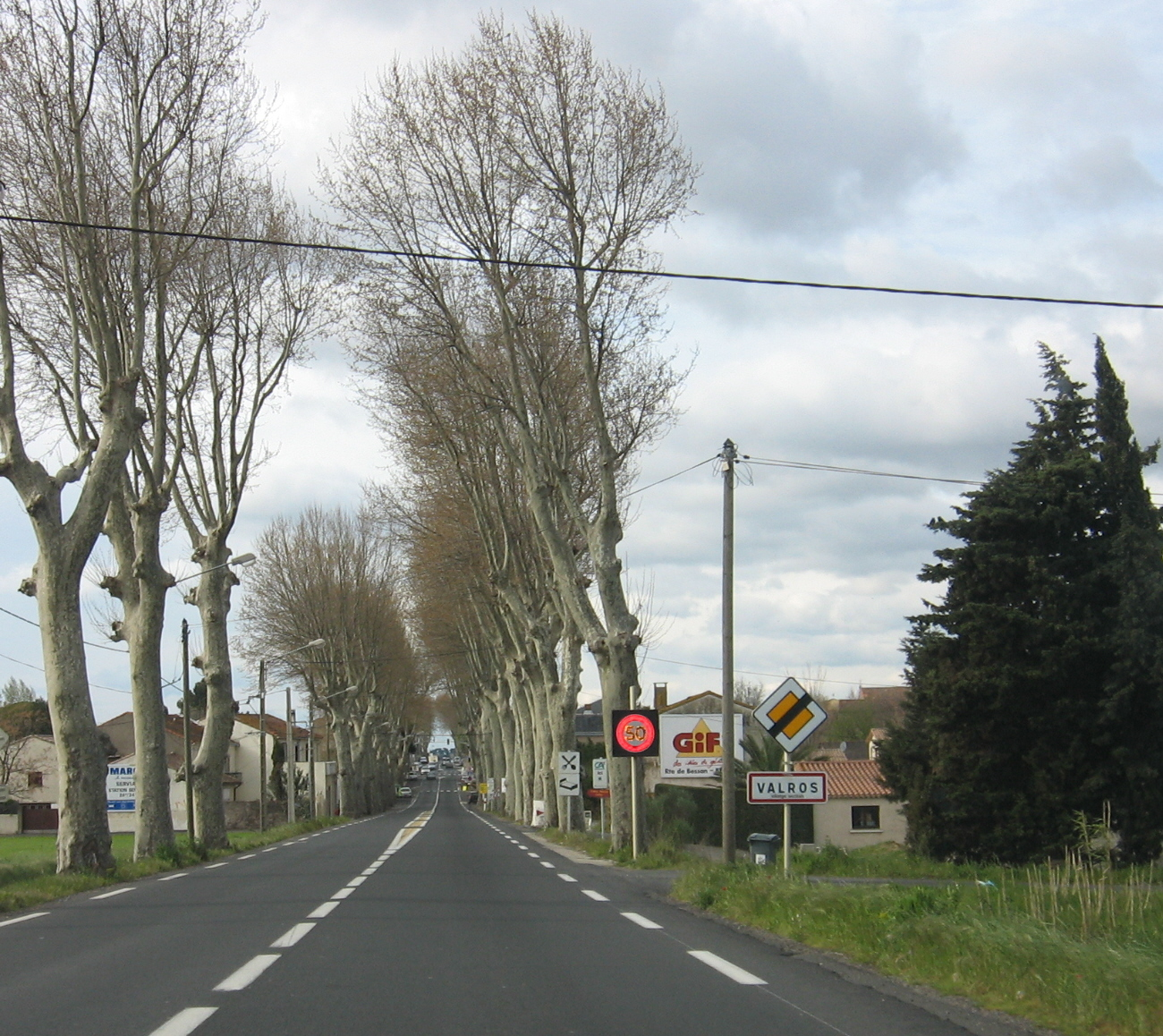
- The road into Valros

- Coat of arms
- Location of Valros
- Location within France Location within Occitanie
- Coordinates: 43°25′16″N 3°22′02″E
- Country: France
- Region: Occitania
- Department: Hérault
- Arrondissement: Béziers
- Canton: Pézenas
- Intercommunality: CA Béziers Méditerranée

Government
  - Mayor (2020–2026): Michel Loup
- Area^{1}: 6.61 km^{2} (2.55 sq mi)
- Highest elevation: 99 m (325 ft)
- Lowest elevation: 24 m (79 ft)
- Population (2023): 1,685
  - Density: 255/km^{2} (660/sq mi)
- Time zone: UTC+01:00 (CET)
  - Summer (DST): UTC+02:00 (CEST)
- INSEE/Postal code: 34325 /34290
- ^{1} French Land Register data, which excludes lakes, ponds, glaciers > 1 km^{2} (0.386 sq mi or 247 acres) and river estuaries.

Valros is a commune in the Hérault department in the Occitanie region in southern France.

== Population ==
Historical population
| Year | Pop. | ±% p.a. |
|---|---|---|
| 1968 | 788 | — |
| 1975 | 761 | −0.50% |
| 1982 | 753 | −0.15% |
| 1990 | 1,021 | +3.88% |
| 1999 | 1,130 | +1.13% |
| 2007 | 1,238 | +1.15% |
| 2012 | 1,477 | +3.59% |
| 2017 | 1,616 | +1.82% |
| 2023 | 1,685 | +0.70% |
Source: INSEE

== Sights and monuments ==
Fort de Valros (also known locally as Tour de Valros) is a ruined small castle or fortress. In the mid-19th century, the fort was the site of a semaphore station.

== See also ==
- Communes of the Hérault department
