= Alignan-du-Vent =

- Commune
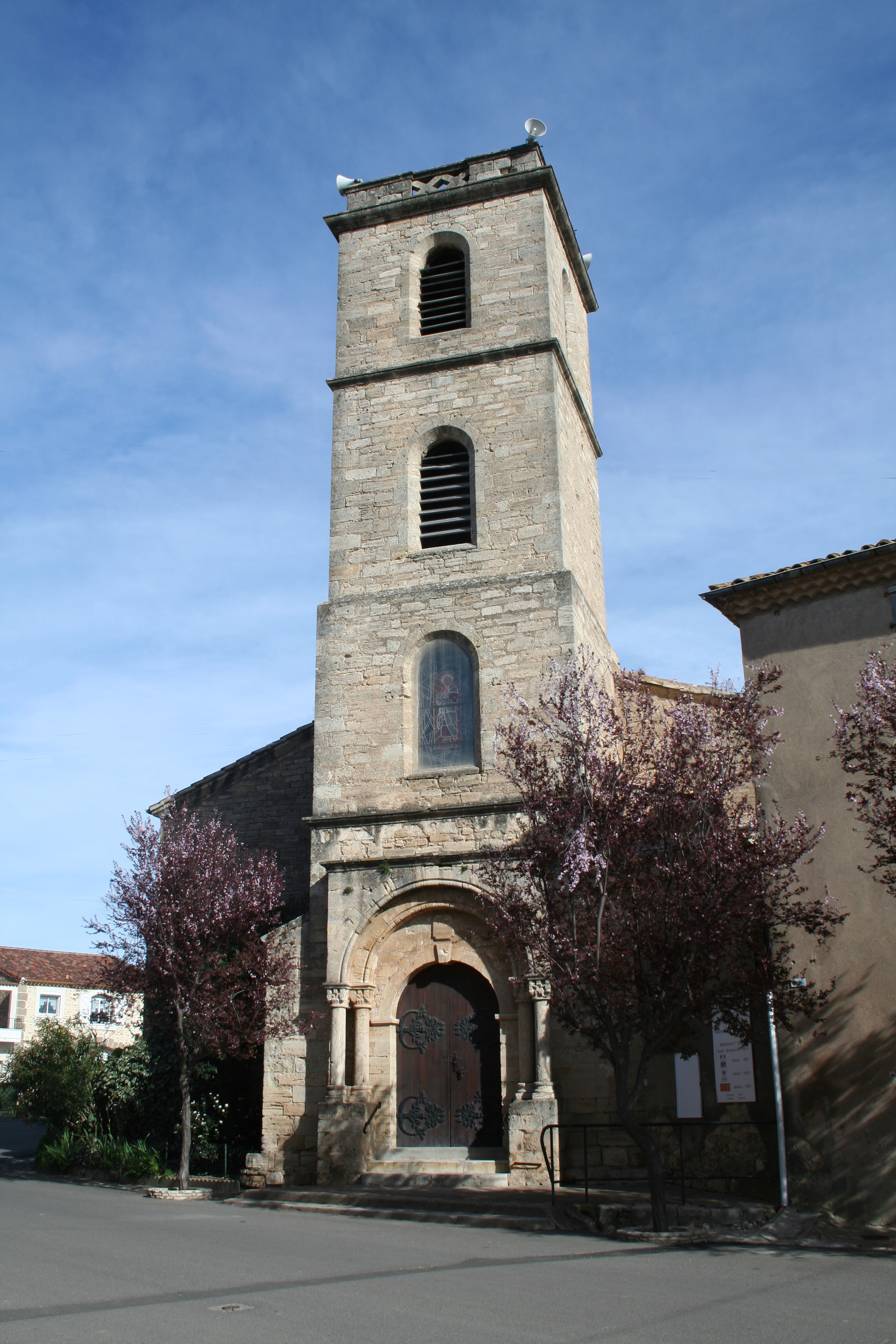
- Church St-Martin

- Coat of arms
- Location of Alignan-du-Vent
- Location within France Location within Occitanie
- Coordinates: 43°28′14″N 3°20′33″E
- Country: France
- Region: Occitania
- Department: Hérault
- Arrondissement: Béziers
- Canton: Pézenas
- Intercommunality: Béziers Méditerranée

Government
  - Mayor (2020–2026): Christophe Pastor
- Area^{1}: 17.3 km^{2} (6.7 sq mi)
- Elevation: 105 m (344 ft)
- Highest elevation: 120 m (390 ft)
- Lowest elevation: 32 m (105 ft)
- Population (2023): 1,796
  - Density: 104/km^{2} (269/sq mi)
- Time zone: UTC+01:00 (CET)
  - Summer (DST): UTC+02:00 (CEST)
- INSEE/Postal code: 34009 /34290
- ^{1} French Land Register data, which excludes lakes, ponds, glaciers > 1 km^{2} (0.386 sq mi or 247 acres) and river estuaries.

Alignan-du-Vent (French pronunciation: [aliɲɑ̃ dy vɑ̃]; Occitan: Alinhan del Vent) is a commune in the Hérault department in the Occitanie region in southern France.

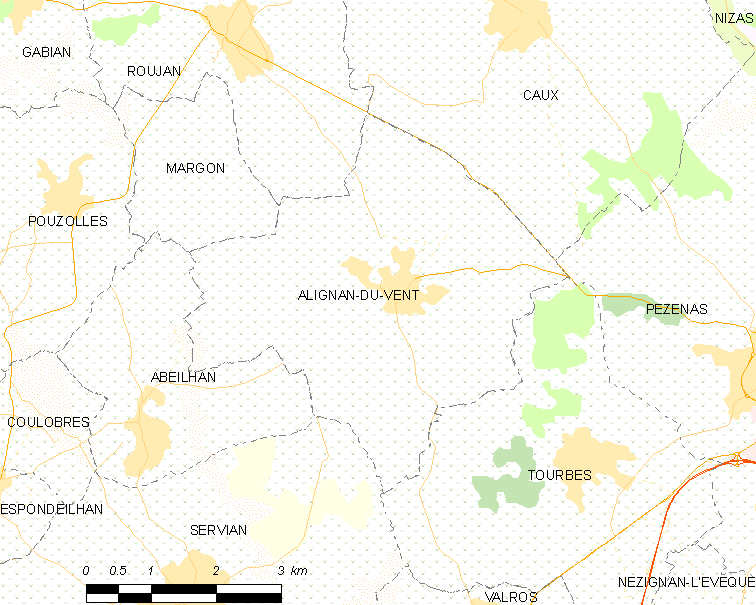
Map

== Population ==
Historical population
Year	Pop.	±% p.a.
1968	1,039	—
1975	912	−1.85%
1982	1,022	+1.64%
1990	1,110	+1.04%
1999	1,134	+0.24%
2007	1,384	+2.52%
2012	1,623	+3.24%
2017	1,737	+1.37%
2023	1,796	+0.56%
Source: INSEE

== Heraldry ==
Alignan-du-Vent	Or, a pall lozengy argent and gules.

== Births ==
Alignan-du-Vent was the birthplace of:

- Léon Azéma (1888–1978), French architect

== See also ==
- Communes of the Hérault department
