= Canton of Roujan =

Coordinates: 43°30′05″N 3°13′19″E

Roujan
- Former canton
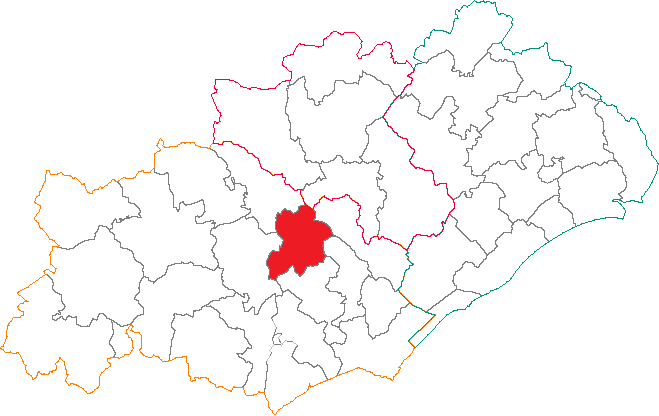
- Country: France
- Region: Occitania
- Department: Hérault
- No. of communes: {{{nbcomm}}}
- Disbanded: 2015
- Population (2012): 9,414

The canton de Roujan is a former canton in the Arrondissement of Béziers, Hérault department, and Languedoc-Roussillon region of France. It had 9,414 inhabitants (2012). It was disbanded following the French canton reorganisation which came into effect in March 2015. It consisted of 11 communes, which joined the canton of Cazouls-lès-Béziers in 2015.

== Composition ==
The canton comprised the following communes:

- Fos
- Fouzilhon
- Gabian
- Magalas
- Margon
- Montesquieu
- Neffiès
- Pouzolles
- Roquessels
- Roujan
- Vailhan

== Administration ==
Term	Name	Political party	Job
1945–1963	Marin Calas	SFIO	Wine merchant Maire of Neffiès (1945–1947)
1963–1976	Jean Péridier	SFIO (later PS)	Sénator (1959–1980); Maire of Le Pouget
1976–1988	Yves Verdeil	PCF	...
1988-en cours	Francis Boutes	PS	Maire de Gabian; Vice-president of the Conseil Général

== Gallery ==
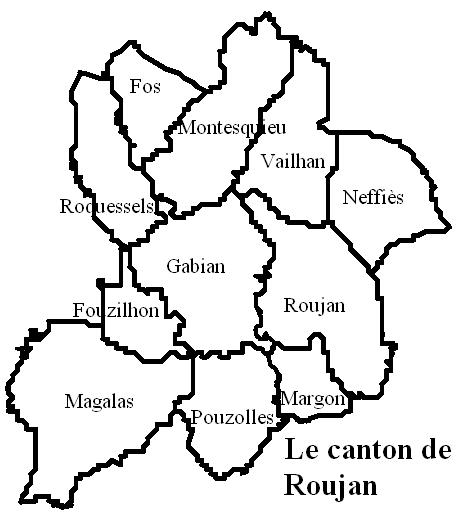

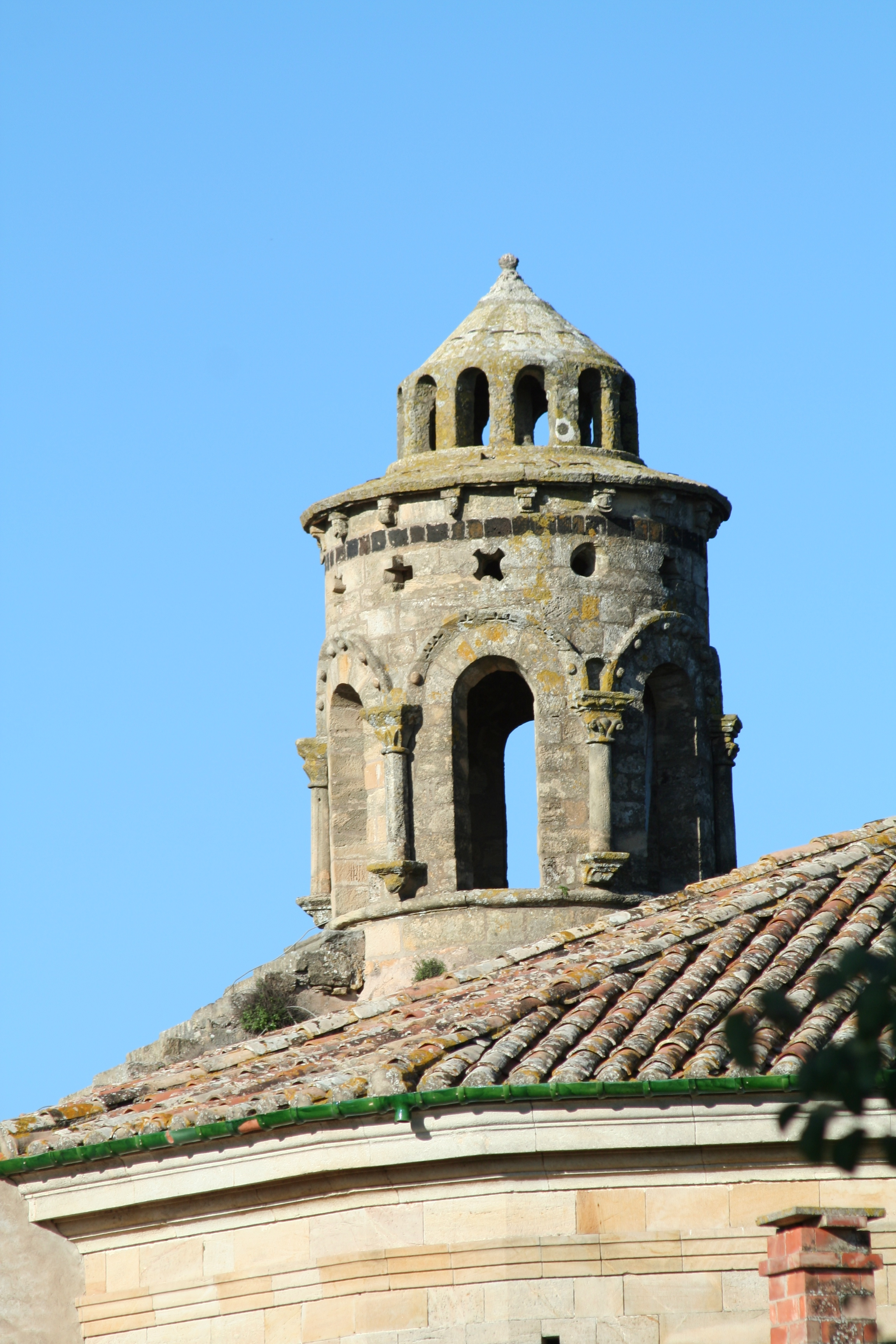
Cassan abbey, in Roujan

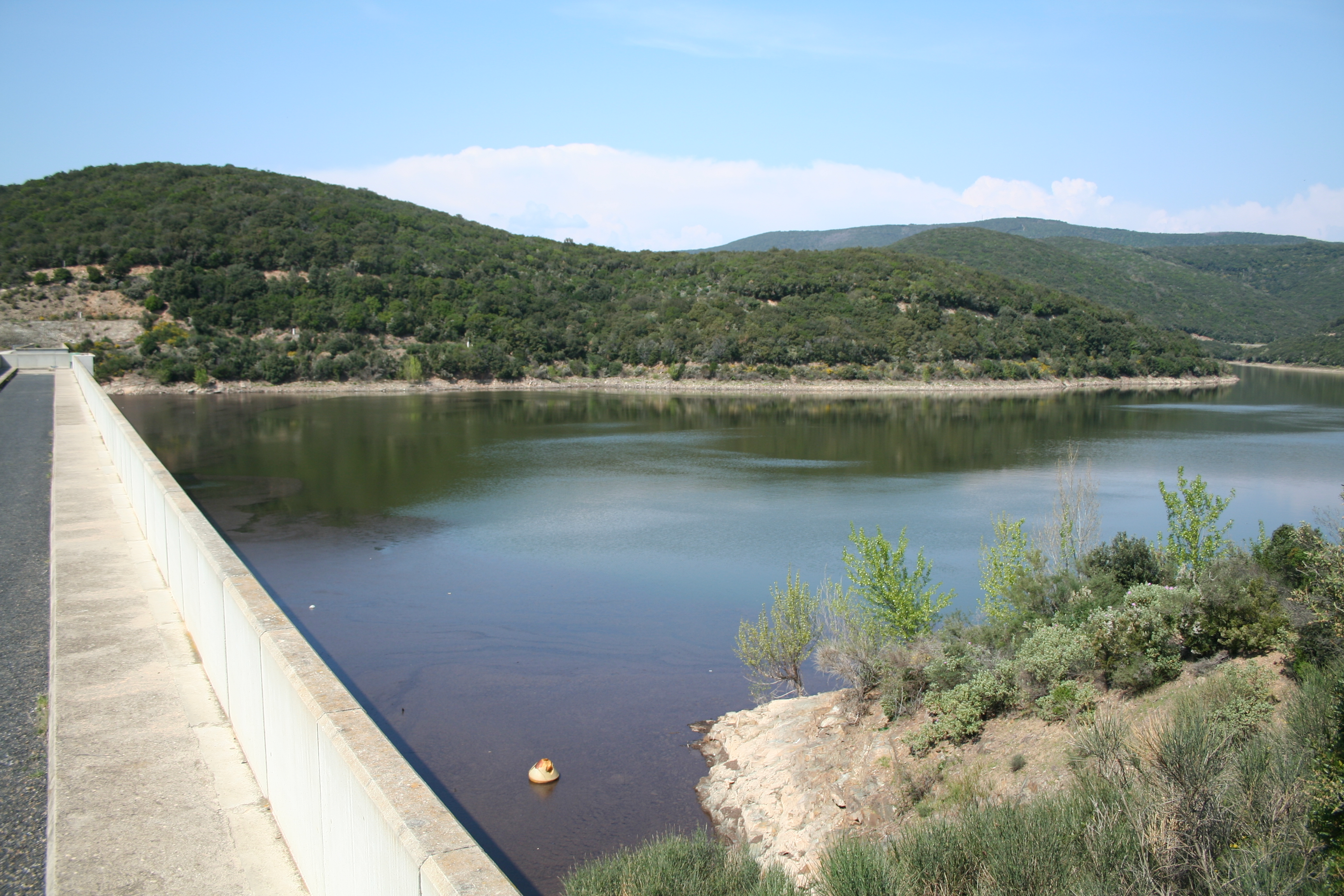
Olivettes dam in Vailhan
