= Communauté de communes Coteaux et Châteaux =

Coordinates: 43.5900°N 3.3700°E

Coteaux et Châteaux
- Former communauté de communes
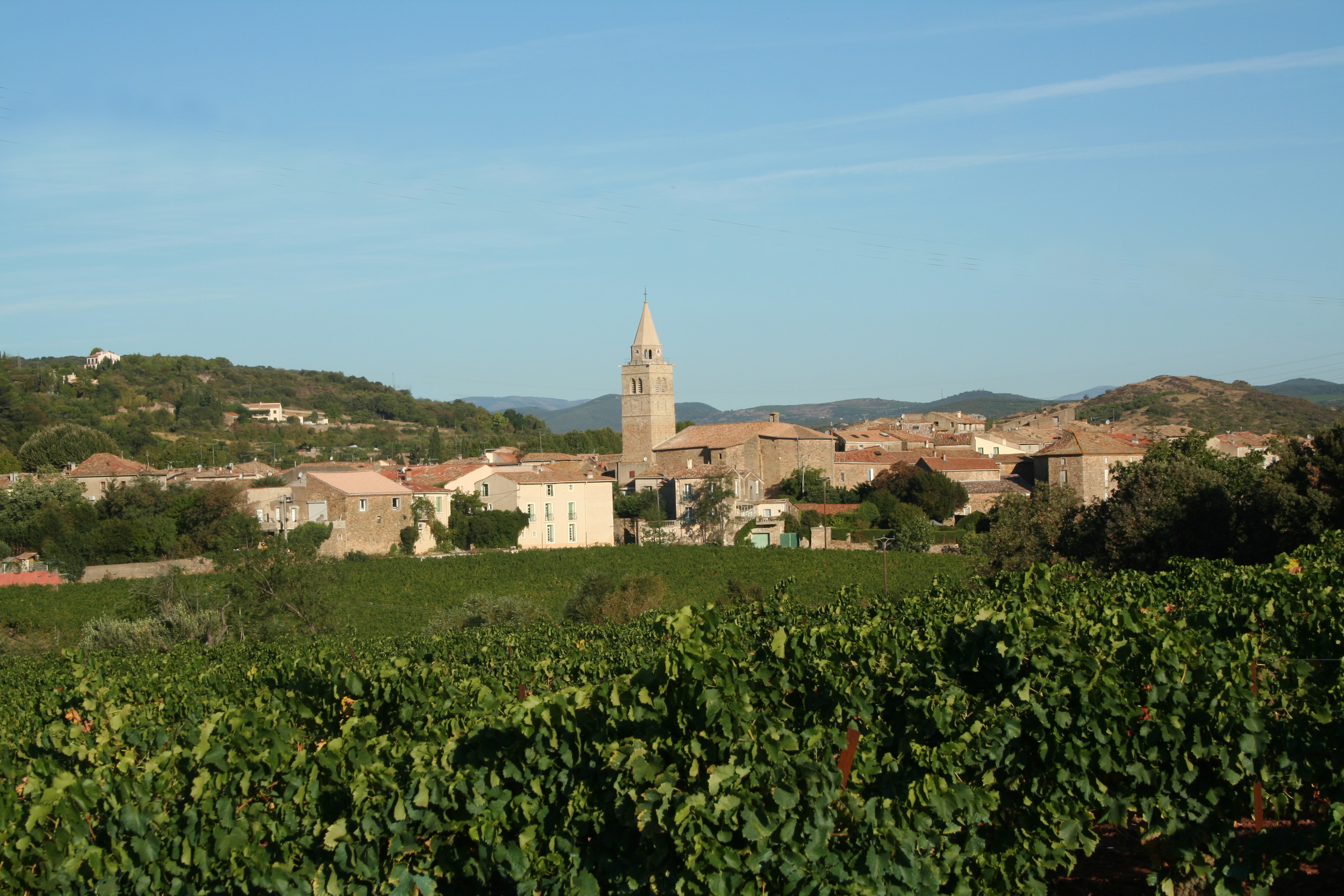
- Interactive map of Coteaux et Châteaux
- Country: France
- Region: Occitania
- Department: Hérault
- No. of communes: {{{nbcomm}}}
- Established: December 31, 1997
- Disbanded: 2013
- Area: 90.66 km^{2} (35.00 sq mi)
- Population (1999): 4,130
  - Density: 45.6/km^{2} (118/sq mi)

The Communauté de communes Coteaux et Châteaux was a communauté de communes in the Hérault département and in the Languedoc-Roussillon region of France.

It was created by prefectoral decision on December 31, 1997 and dissolved on January 1, 2013 upon merging with surrounding communauté de communes to form the Communauté de communes des Avant-Monts du Centre Hérault.

== Etymology ==
The name "Coteaux et Châteaux" derives from the local coteaux (vineyards) and châteaux, both prominent in the countryside.

== Communes ==
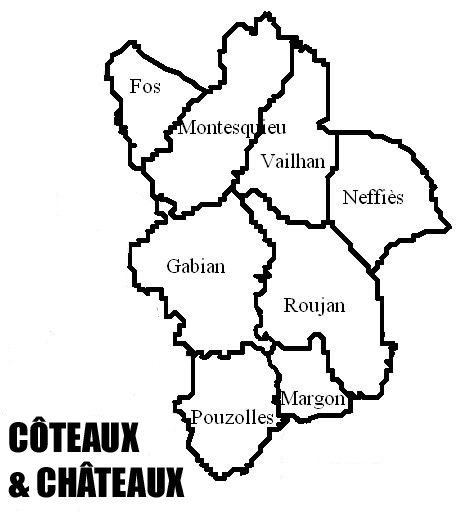

Coteaux et Châteaux comprised the following communes:

- Fos
- Gabian
- Margon
- Montesquieu
- Neffiès
- Pouzolles
- Roujan
- Vailhan
