= Puimisson =

- Commune
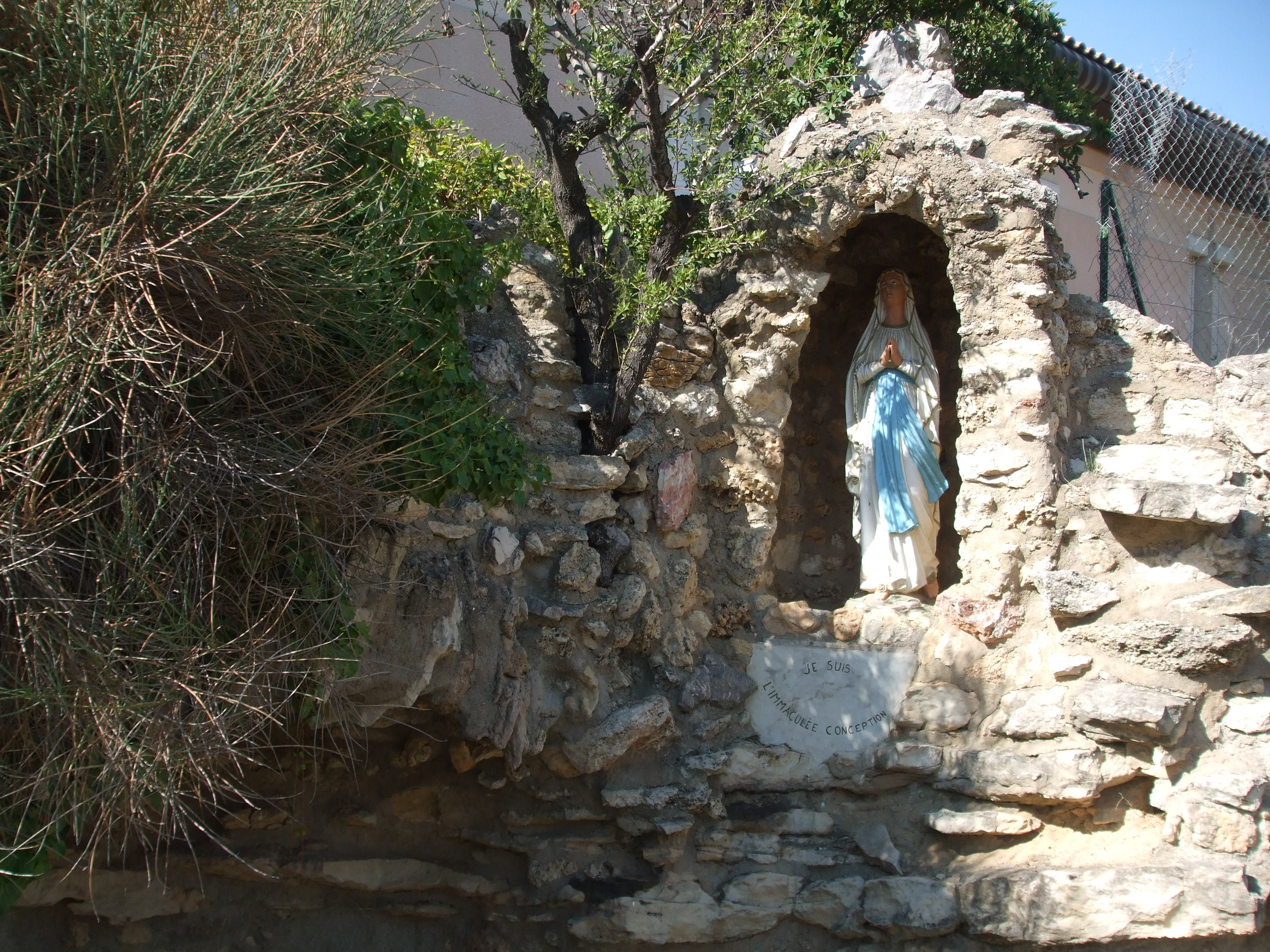

- Coat of arms
- Location of Puimisson
- Location within France Location within Occitanie
- Coordinates: 43°26′27″N 3°12′29″E
- Country: France
- Region: Occitania
- Department: Hérault
- Arrondissement: Béziers
- Canton: Cazouls-lès-Béziers
- Intercommunality: CC Les Avant-Monts

Government
  - Mayor (2020–2026): Daniel Barthes
- Area^{1}: 6.38 km^{2} (2.46 sq mi)
- Highest elevation: 137 m (449 ft)
- Lowest elevation: 65 m (213 ft)
- Population (2023): 1,225
  - Density: 192/km^{2} (497/sq mi)
- Time zone: UTC+01:00 (CET)
  - Summer (DST): UTC+02:00 (CEST)
- INSEE/Postal code: 34223 /34480
- ^{1} French Land Register data, which excludes lakes, ponds, glaciers > 1 km^{2} (0.386 sq mi or 247 acres) and river estuaries.

Puimisson (French pronunciation: [pɥimisɔ̃]; Occitan: Puègmiçon) is a commune in the Hérault department in the Occitanie region in southern France.

== Etymology ==
Attested in the forms ad Podio Mincione in 1097, castrum Podio Missionis around 1182, ad Podium Mucionem in 1183, castro Podiimisonis in 1210, Podio Micione in 1247 and 1248, Puimisson in 1529.

From the Late Latin podium "height" and the Roman surname Mintionius.

Until the beginning of the 21st century, the village's population remained highly concentrated around its old castle. The main inhabited places are located to the southeast of the village:

- Les Charmettes and Le Cayron, sandwiched between the D 909 to the west and Le Libron to the east;

- Sainte-Suzanne, further south and overlooking the D 909.

== Population ==
Historical population
Year	Pop.	±% p.a.
1968	721	—
1975	710	−0.22%
1982	734	+0.48%
1990	738	+0.07%
1999	788	+0.73%
2007	962	+2.53%
2012	1,035	+1.47%
2017	1,077	+0.80%
2023	1,225	+2.17%
Source: INSEE

== See also ==
- Communes of the Hérault department
