= Communauté de communes Les Avant-Monts =

Federation of municipalities in Occitanie, France

Les Avant-Monts
- Communauté de communes
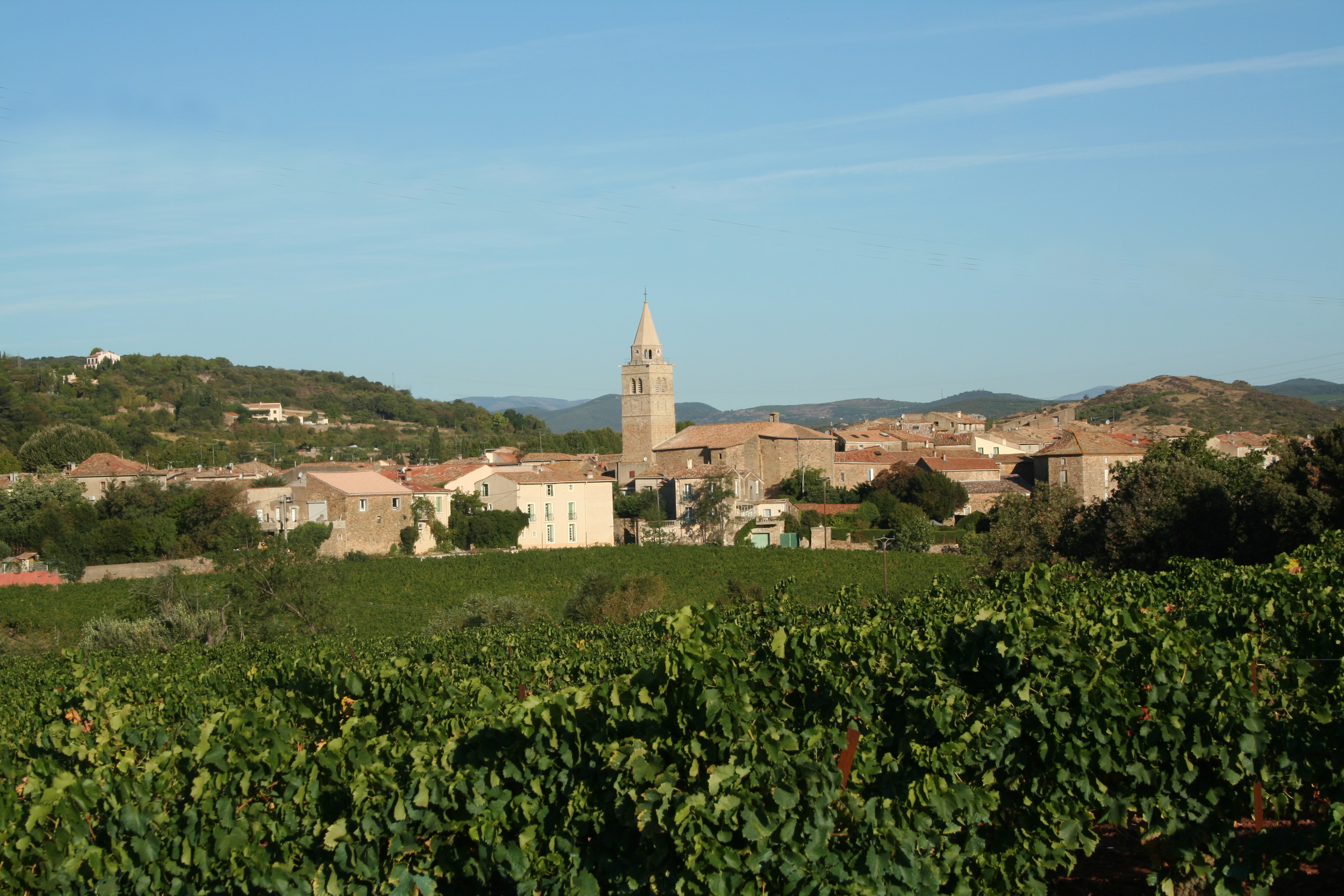
- Country: France
- Region: Occitania
- Department: Hérault
- No. of communes: {{{nbcomm}}}
- Established: 1 January 2017

Government
  - President: Francis Boutes
- Area: 353.4 km^{2} (136.4 sq mi)
- Population (2018): 27,144
  - Density: 76.81/km^{2} (198.9/sq mi)
- Website: www.avant-monts.fr

The Communauté de communes Les Avant-Monts is a communauté de communes in the Hérault département and in the Occitanie region of France. Its seat is in Magalas. Its area is 353.4 km^{2}. Its population was 27,144 in 2018.

It was created on 1 January 2017 by the merger of the Communauté de communes des Avant-Monts du Centre Hérault and the Communauté de communes Orb et Taurou. The Communauté de communes des Avant-Monts du Centre Hérault was created on 1 January 2013 through the merging of Communauté de communes Coteaux et Châteaux, Communauté de communes Framps 909 and Communauté de communes Faugères.

== Composition ==
The communauté de communes consists of the following 25 communes:

1. Abeilhan
2. Autignac
3. Cabrerolles
4. Causses-et-Veyran
5. Caussiniojouls
6. Faugères
7. Fos
8. Fouzilhon
9. Gabian
10. Laurens
11. Magalas
12. Margon
13. Montesquieu
14. Murviel-lès-Béziers
15. Neffiès
16. Pailhès
17. Pouzolles
18. Puimisson
19. Puissalicon
20. Roquessels
21. Roujan
22. Saint-Geniès-de-Fontedit
23. Saint-Nazaire-de-Ladarez
24. Thézan-lès-Béziers
25. Vailhan
