= Saint-Geniès-de-Fontedit =

- Commune
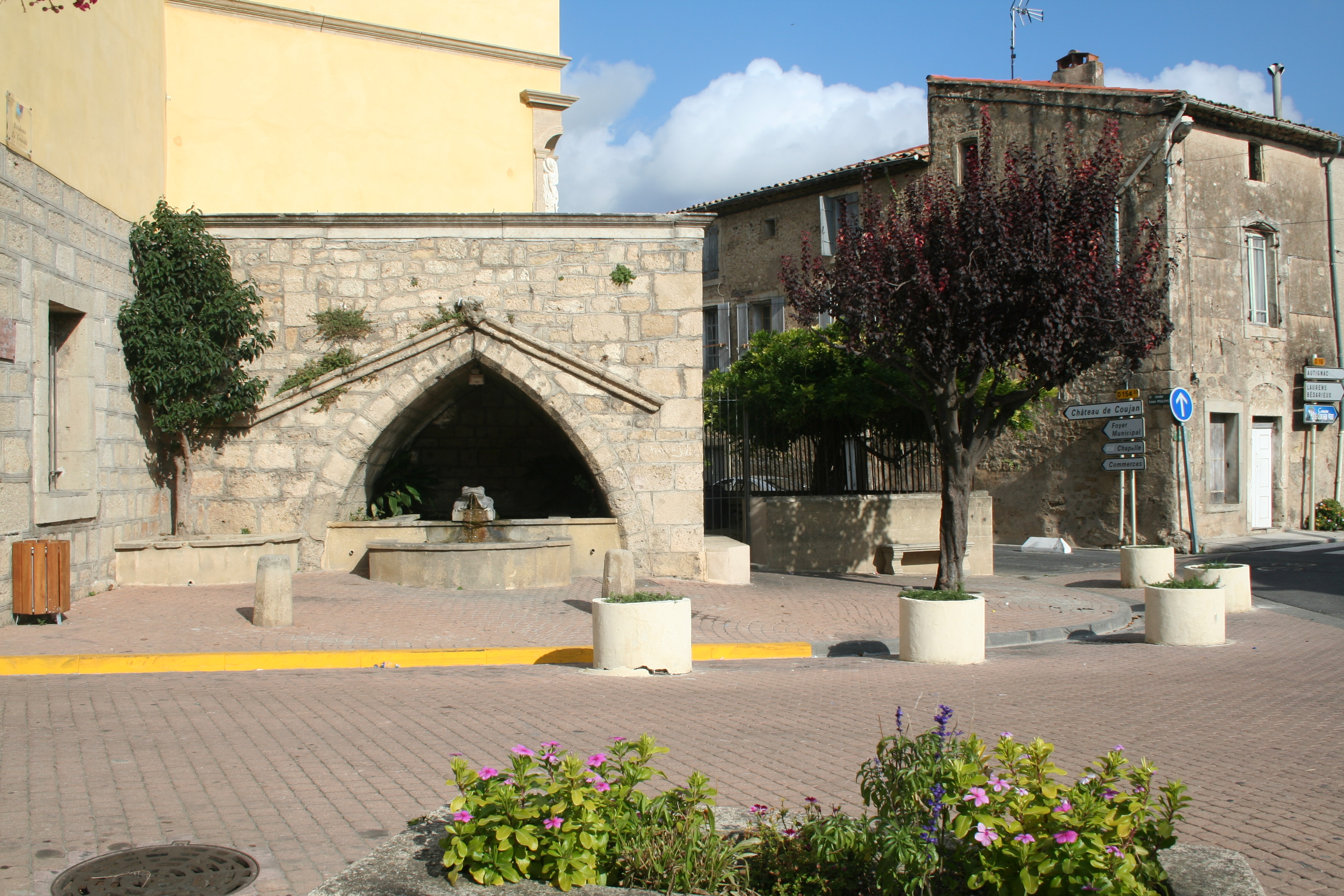
- The fountain in Saint-Geniès-de-Fontedit

- Coat of arms
- Location of Saint-Geniès-de-Fontedit
- Location within France Location within Occitanie
- Coordinates: 43°28′09″N 3°10′46″E
- Country: France
- Region: Occitania
- Department: Hérault
- Arrondissement: Béziers
- Canton: Cazouls-lès-Béziers
- Intercommunality: CC Les Avant-Monts

Government
  - Mayor (2020–2026): Lionel Gayssot
- Area^{1}: 9.24 km^{2} (3.57 sq mi)
- Elevation: 96 m (315 ft)
- Highest elevation: 150 m (490 ft)
- Lowest elevation: 58 m (190 ft)
- Population (2023): 1,722
  - Density: 186/km^{2} (483/sq mi)
- Time zone: UTC+01:00 (CET)
  - Summer (DST): UTC+02:00 (CEST)
- INSEE/Postal code: 34258 /34480
- ^{1} French Land Register data, which excludes lakes, ponds, glaciers > 1 km^{2} (0.386 sq mi or 247 acres) and river estuaries.

Saint-Geniès-de-Fontedit (before 1988: Saint-Geniès-le-Bas) is a commune in the Hérault department in the Occitanie region in southern France.

== Population ==
Historical population
Year	Pop.	±% p.a.
1968	1,029	—
1975	1,032	+0.04%
1982	1,022	−0.14%
1990	1,029	+0.09%
1999	1,076	+0.50%
2007	1,241	+1.80%
2012	1,447	+3.12%
2017	1,593	+1.94%
2023	1,722	+1.31%
Source: INSEE

== Images ==
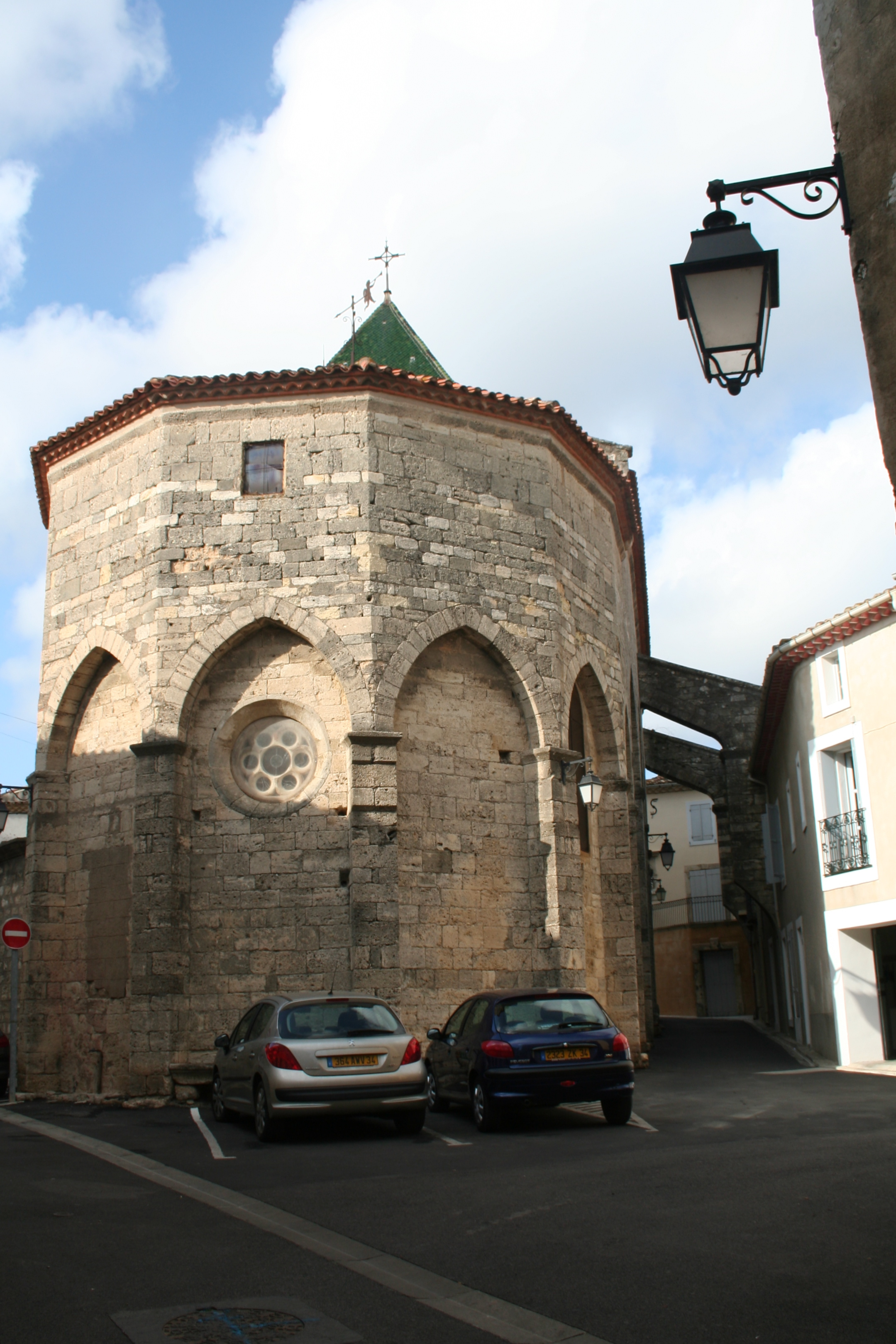
Church of Saint-Genies.

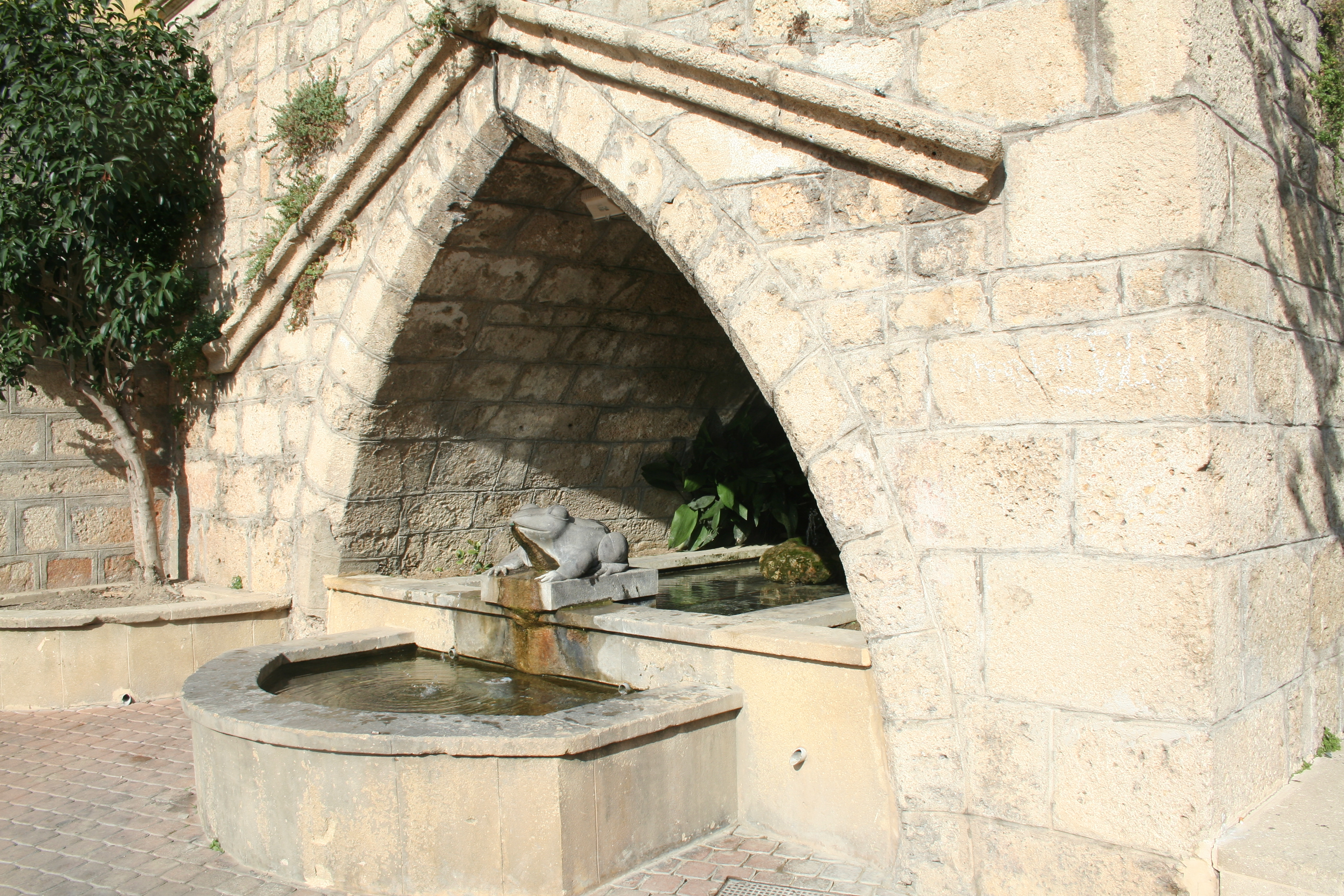
Frog Fountain - the frog is the emblem of Saint-Genies

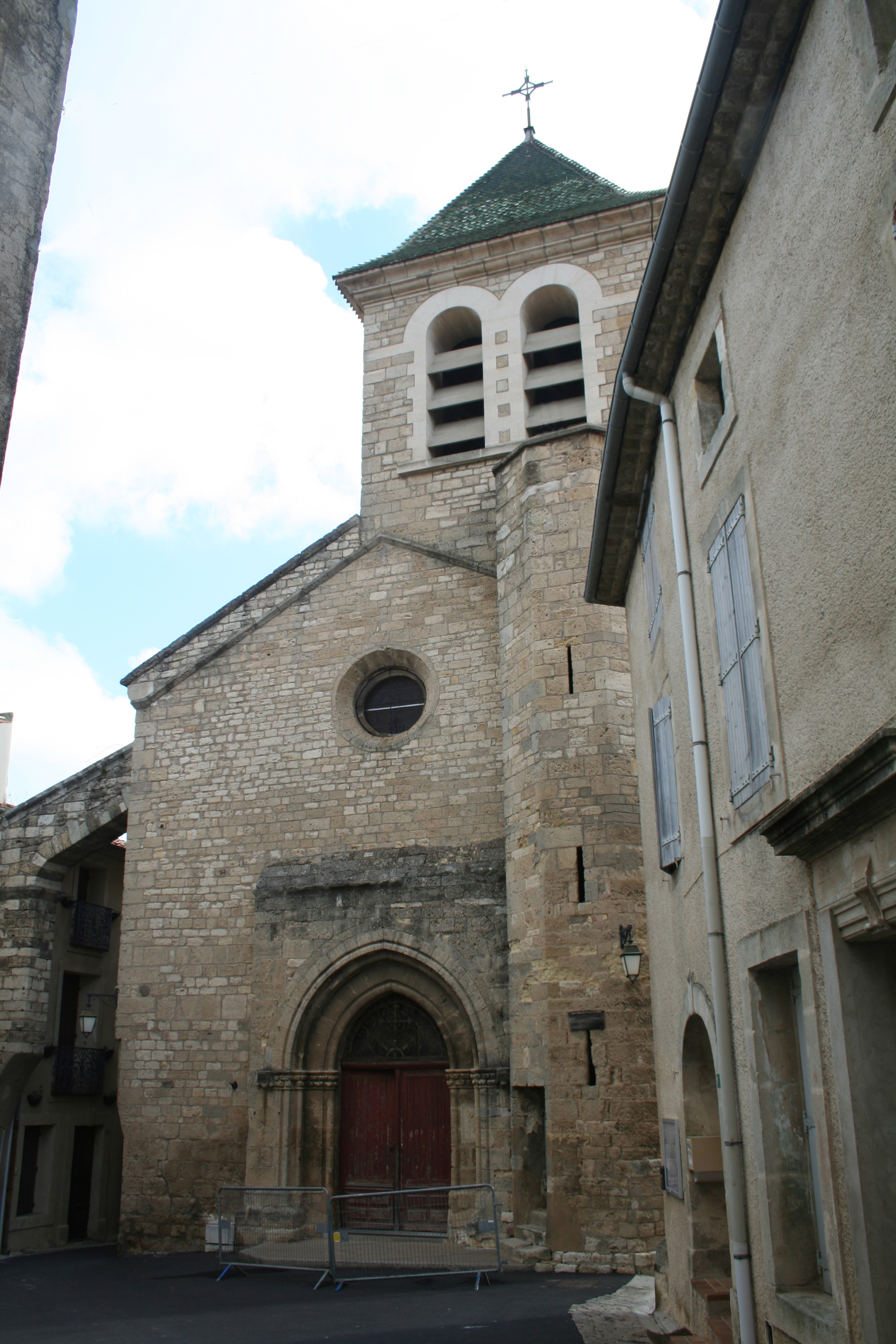
facade of the church of Saint-Genies

== International relations ==
The commune is twinned with:

- Albudeite, Spain

== See also ==
- Communes of the Hérault department
