= Murviel-lès-Béziers =

- Commune
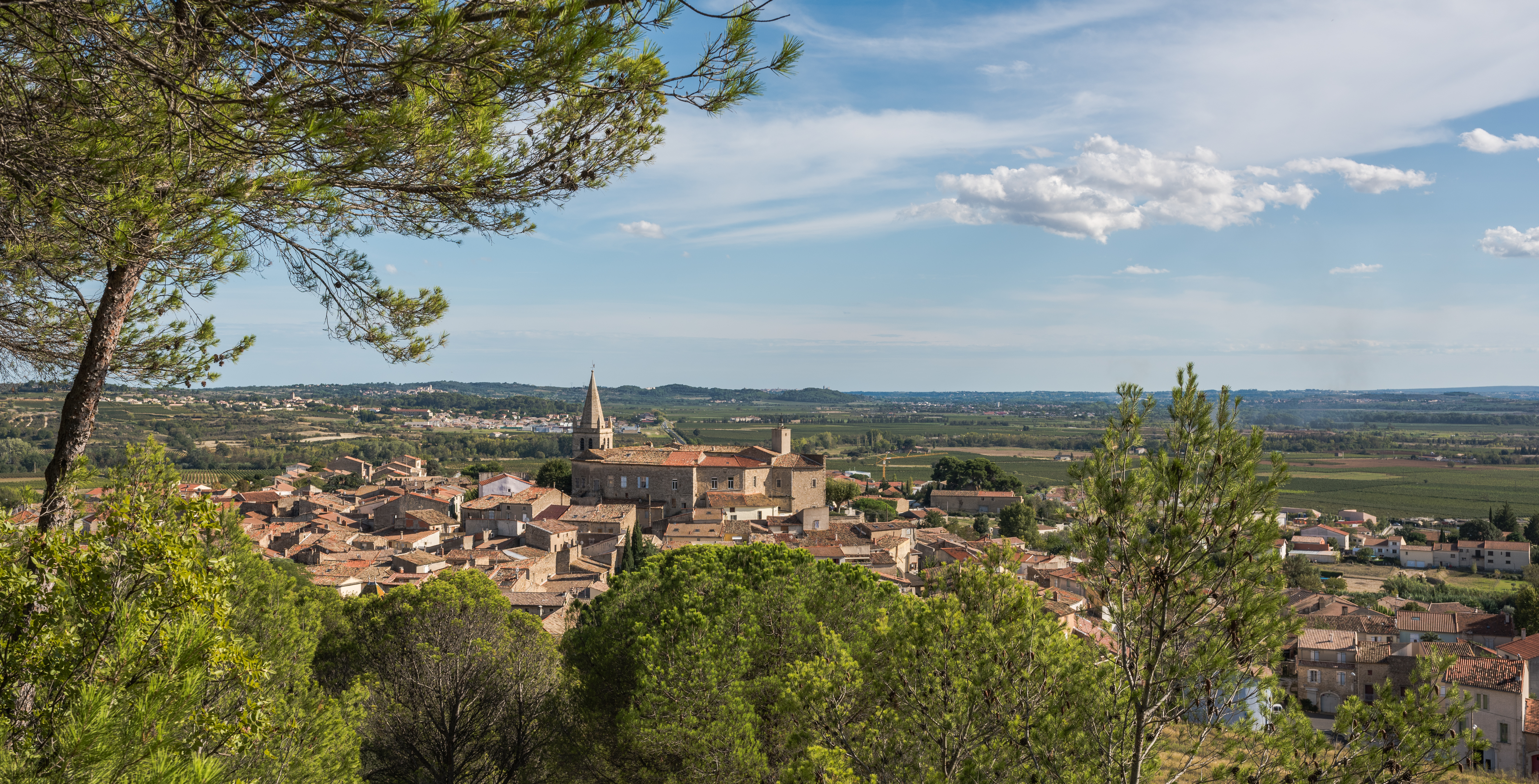
- A general view of Murviel-lès-Béziers

- Coat of arms
- Location of Murviel-lès-Béziers
- Location within France Location within Occitanie
- Coordinates: 43°26′29″N 3°08′42″E
- Country: France
- Region: Occitania
- Department: Hérault
- Arrondissement: Béziers
- Canton: Cazouls-lès-Béziers
- Intercommunality: CC Les Avant-Monts

Government
  - Mayor (2020–2026): Sylvain Hager
- Area^{1}: 32.36 km^{2} (12.49 sq mi)
- Elevation: 62 m (203 ft)
- Highest elevation: 220 m (720 ft)
- Lowest elevation: 19 m (62 ft)
- Population (2023): 3,000
  - Density: 93/km^{2} (240/sq mi)
- Time zone: UTC+01:00 (CET)
  - Summer (DST): UTC+02:00 (CEST)
- INSEE/Postal code: 34178 /34490
- ^{1} French Land Register data, which excludes lakes, ponds, glaciers > 1 km^{2} (0.386 sq mi or 247 acres) and river estuaries.

Murviel-lès-Béziers (French pronunciation: [myʁvjɛl lɛ bezje], literally Murviel near Béziers; Occitan: Murvièlh) is a commune in the Hérault department in the Occitanie region in southern France.

== Geography ==
=== Climate ===
Murviel-lès-Béziers has a mediterranean climate (Köppen climate classification Csa). The average annual temperature in Murviel-lès-Béziers is 14.9 °C (58.8 °F). The average annual rainfall is 675.5 mm (26.59 in) with October as the wettest month. The temperatures are highest on average in July, at around 23.6 °C (74.5 °F), and lowest in January, at around 7.5 °C (45.5 °F). The highest temperature ever recorded in Murviel-lès-Béziers was 42.9 °C (109.2 °F) on 28 June 2019; the coldest temperature ever recorded was −8.5 °C (16.7 °F) on 9 February 2012.

Climate data for Murviel-lès-Béziers (1981–2010 averages, extremes 1990−present)
Month	Jan	Feb	Mar	Apr	May	Jun	Jul	Aug	Sep	Oct	Nov	Dec	Year
Record high °C (°F)	21.0 (69.8)	23.0 (73.4)	29.1 (84.4)	32.0 (89.6)	35.1 (95.2)	42.9 (109.2)	38.0 (100.4)	40.5 (104.9)	37.3 (99.1)	32.4 (90.3)	25.3 (77.5)	23.3 (73.9)	42.9 (109.2)
Mean daily maximum °C (°F)	11.6 (52.9)	12.6 (54.7)	15.9 (60.6)	18.3 (64.9)	22.4 (72.3)	26.9 (80.4)	29.9 (85.8)	29.7 (85.5)	24.9 (76.8)	19.9 (67.8)	14.9 (58.8)	11.6 (52.9)	19.9 (67.8)
Daily mean °C (°F)	7.5 (45.5)	8.2 (46.8)	11.0 (51.8)	13.2 (55.8)	17.1 (62.8)	21.0 (69.8)	23.6 (74.5)	23.5 (74.3)	19.3 (66.7)	15.6 (60.1)	10.7 (51.3)	7.7 (45.9)	14.9 (58.8)
Mean daily minimum °C (°F)	3.5 (38.3)	3.7 (38.7)	6.1 (43.0)	8.2 (46.8)	11.9 (53.4)	15.0 (59.0)	17.3 (63.1)	17.3 (63.1)	13.7 (56.7)	11.3 (52.3)	6.6 (43.9)	3.7 (38.7)	9.9 (49.8)
Record low °C (°F)	−7.3 (18.9)	−8.5 (16.7)	−7.4 (18.7)	−1.2 (29.8)	2.6 (36.7)	7.0 (44.6)	9.7 (49.5)	8.9 (48.0)	5.2 (41.4)	−0.6 (30.9)	−6.8 (19.8)	−8.2 (17.2)	−8.5 (16.7)
Average precipitation mm (inches)	62.2 (2.45)	54.4 (2.14)	38.5 (1.52)	58.9 (2.32)	53.2 (2.09)	39.0 (1.54)	21.5 (0.85)	43.7 (1.72)	79.3 (3.12)	92.6 (3.65)	65.9 (2.59)	66.3 (2.61)	675.5 (26.59)
Average precipitation days (≥ 1.0 mm)	6.4	5.1	4.8	6.5	6.4	4.1	3.0	4.7	5.3	7.0	5.7	5.8	64.5
Source: Meteociel

== Population ==
Historical population
Year	Pop.	±% p.a.
1968	2,023	—
1975	1,871	−1.11%
1982	1,949	+0.59%
1990	2,264	+1.89%
1999	2,392	+0.61%
2007	2,674	+1.40%
2012	2,927	+1.82%
2017	3,075	+0.99%
2023	3,000	−0.41%
Source: INSEE

== See also ==
- Communes of the Hérault department
