= Causses-et-Veyran =

- Commune
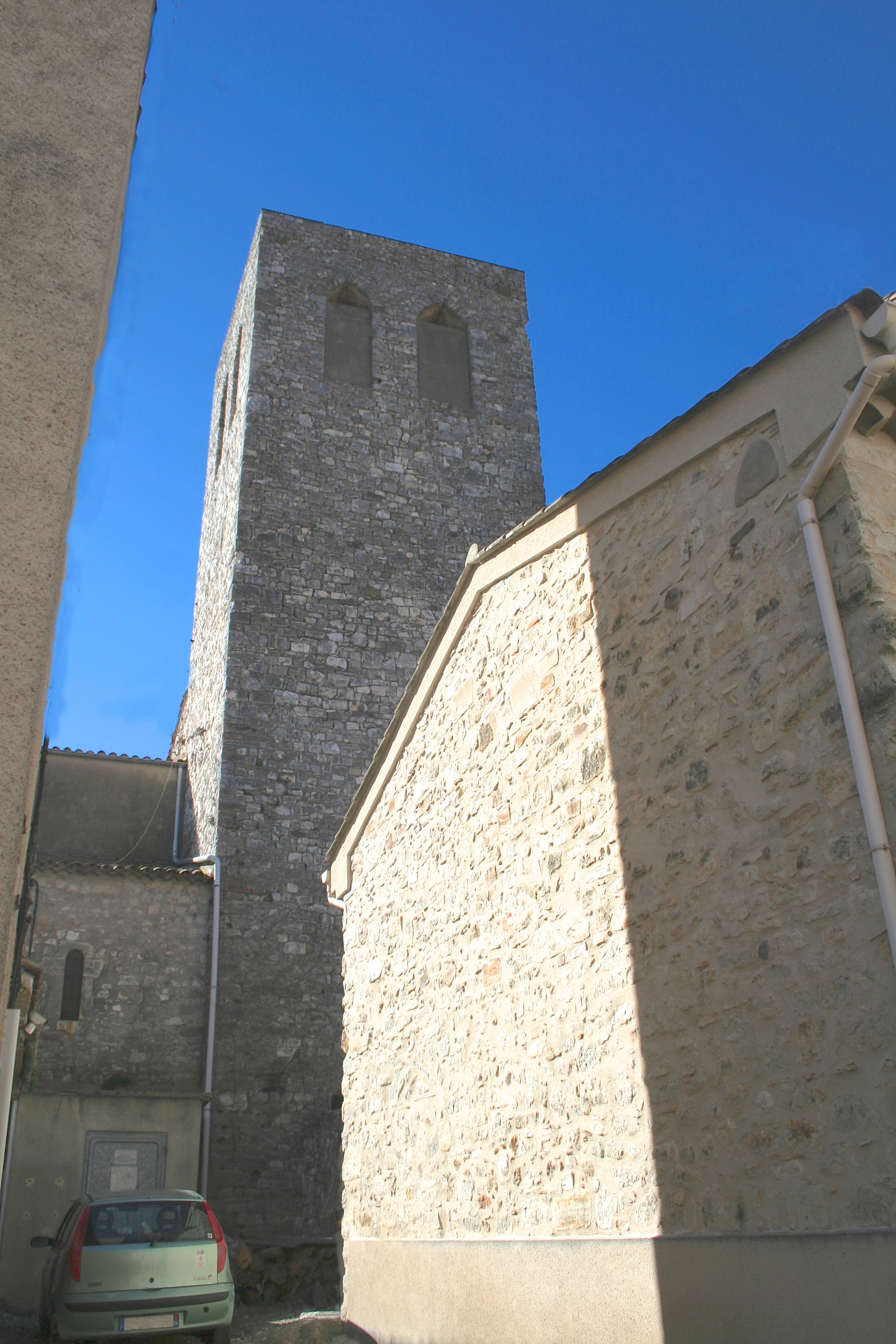
- The bell tower of Causses-et-Veyran

- Coat of arms
- Location of Causses-et-Veyran
- Location within France Location within Occitanie
- Coordinates: 43°28′31″N 3°05′13″E
- Country: France
- Region: Occitania
- Department: Hérault
- Arrondissement: Béziers
- Canton: Cazouls-lès-Béziers
- Intercommunality: CC Les Avant-Monts

Government
  - Mayor (2020–2026): Gérard Baro
- Area^{1}: 17.65 km^{2} (6.81 sq mi)
- Elevation: 150 m (490 ft)
- Highest elevation: 403 m (1,322 ft)
- Lowest elevation: 33 m (108 ft)
- Population (2023): 613
  - Density: 34.7/km^{2} (90.0/sq mi)
- Time zone: UTC+01:00 (CET)
  - Summer (DST): UTC+02:00 (CEST)
- INSEE/Postal code: 34061 /34490
- ^{1} French Land Register data, which excludes lakes, ponds, glaciers > 1 km^{2} (0.386 sq mi or 247 acres) and river estuaries.

Causses-et-Veyran (French pronunciation: [kos e veʁɑ̃]; Occitan: Causses e Vairan) is a commune in the Hérault department in southern France.

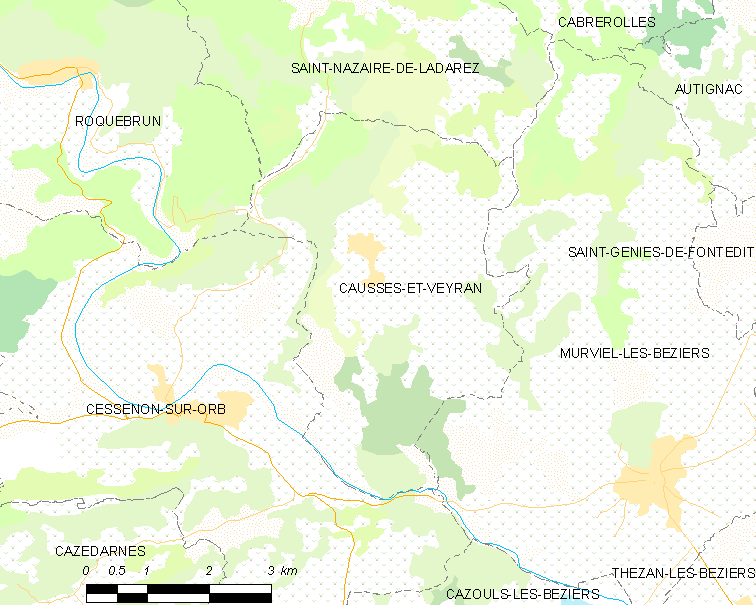
Map

== Population ==
Historical population
Year	Pop.	±% p.a.
1968	612	—
1975	503	−2.76%
1982	503	+0.00%
1990	504	+0.02%
1999	546	+0.89%
2007	583	+0.82%
2012	636	+1.76%
2017	603	−1.06%
2023	613	+0.27%
Source: INSEE

== See also ==
- Communes of the Hérault department
