= Caussiniojouls =

- Commune
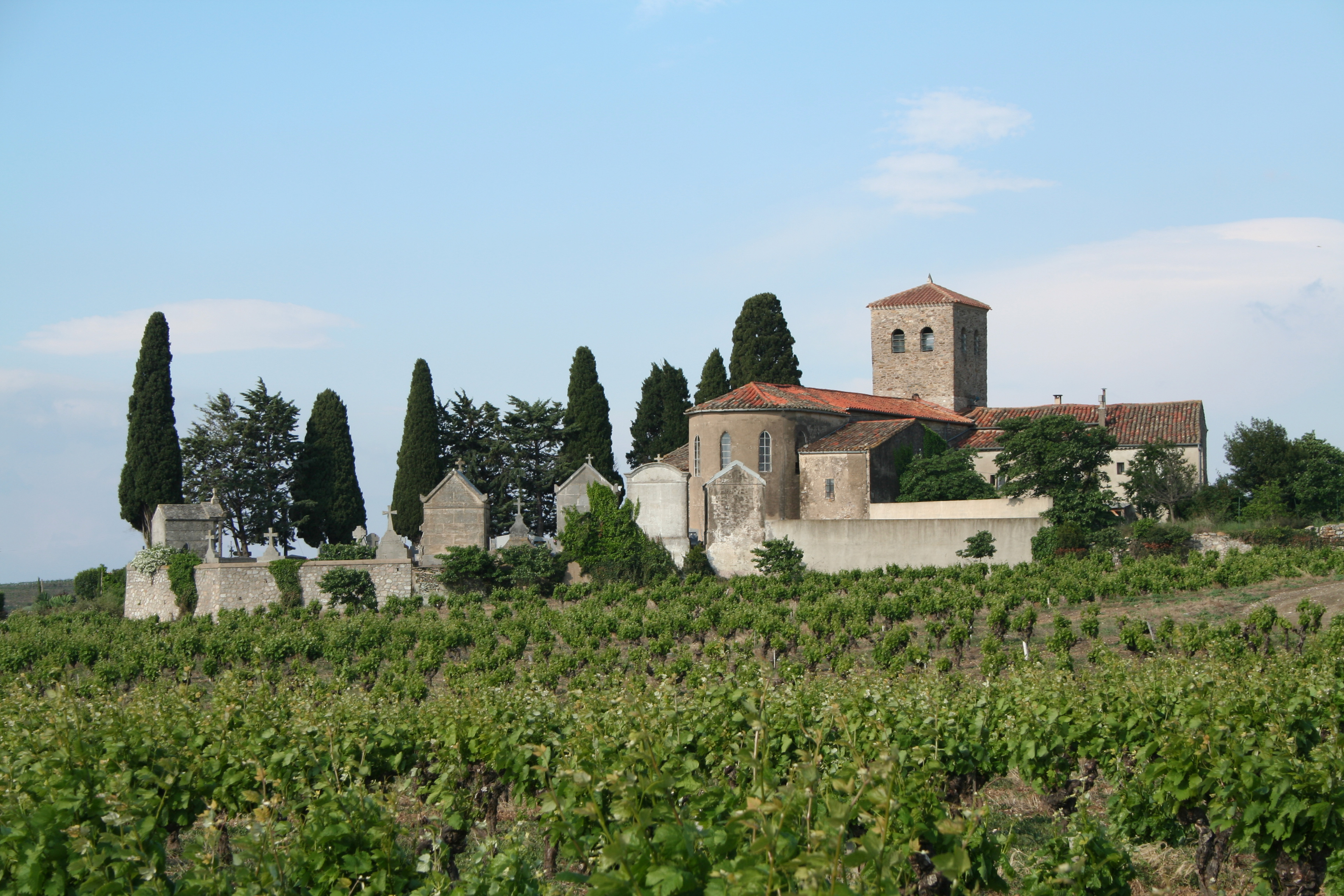
- Saint Etienne Church surrounded by vineyards

- Coat of arms
- Location of Caussiniojouls
- Location within France Location within Occitanie
- Coordinates: 43°33′08″N 3°09′11″E
- Country: France
- Region: Occitania
- Department: Hérault
- Arrondissement: Béziers
- Canton: Cazouls-lès-Béziers
- Intercommunality: CC Les Avant-Monts

Government
  - Mayor (2020–2026): Thierry Roque
- Area^{1}: 10.5 km^{2} (4.1 sq mi)
- Elevation: 315 m (1,033 ft)
- Highest elevation: 547 m (1,795 ft)
- Lowest elevation: 178 m (584 ft)
- Population (2023): 164
  - Density: 15.6/km^{2} (40.5/sq mi)
- Time zone: UTC+01:00 (CET)
  - Summer (DST): UTC+02:00 (CEST)
- INSEE/Postal code: 34062 /34600
- ^{1} French Land Register data, which excludes lakes, ponds, glaciers > 1 km^{2} (0.386 sq mi or 247 acres) and river estuaries.

Caussiniojouls is a commune in the Hérault department in southern France.

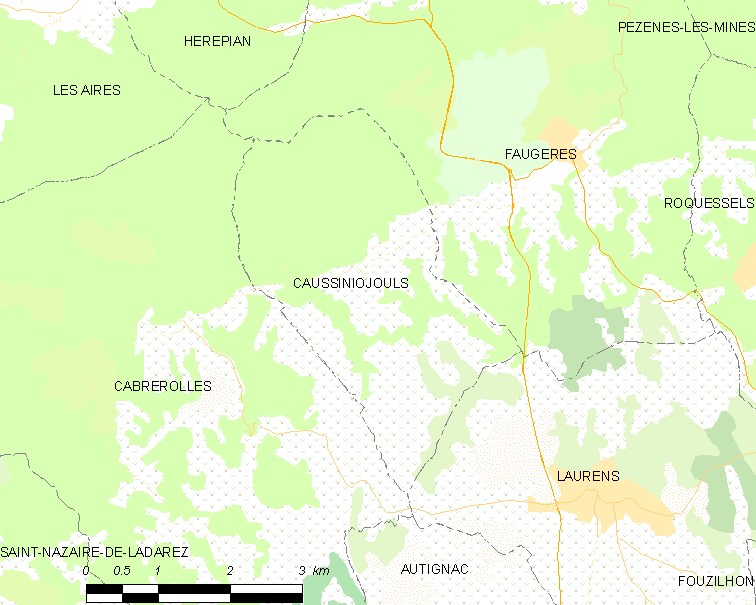
Map

== Winemaking ==
Caussiniojouls is one of the seven communes which produces Faugères AOC wine.

== Population ==
Historical population
Year	Pop.	±% p.a.
1968	155	—
1975	154	−0.09%
1982	152	−0.19%
1990	121	−2.81%
1999	117	−0.37%
2007	121	+0.42%
2012	129	+1.29%
2017	130	+0.15%
2023	164	+3.95%
Source: INSEE

== See also ==
- Communes of the Hérault department
