= Magalas =

- Commune
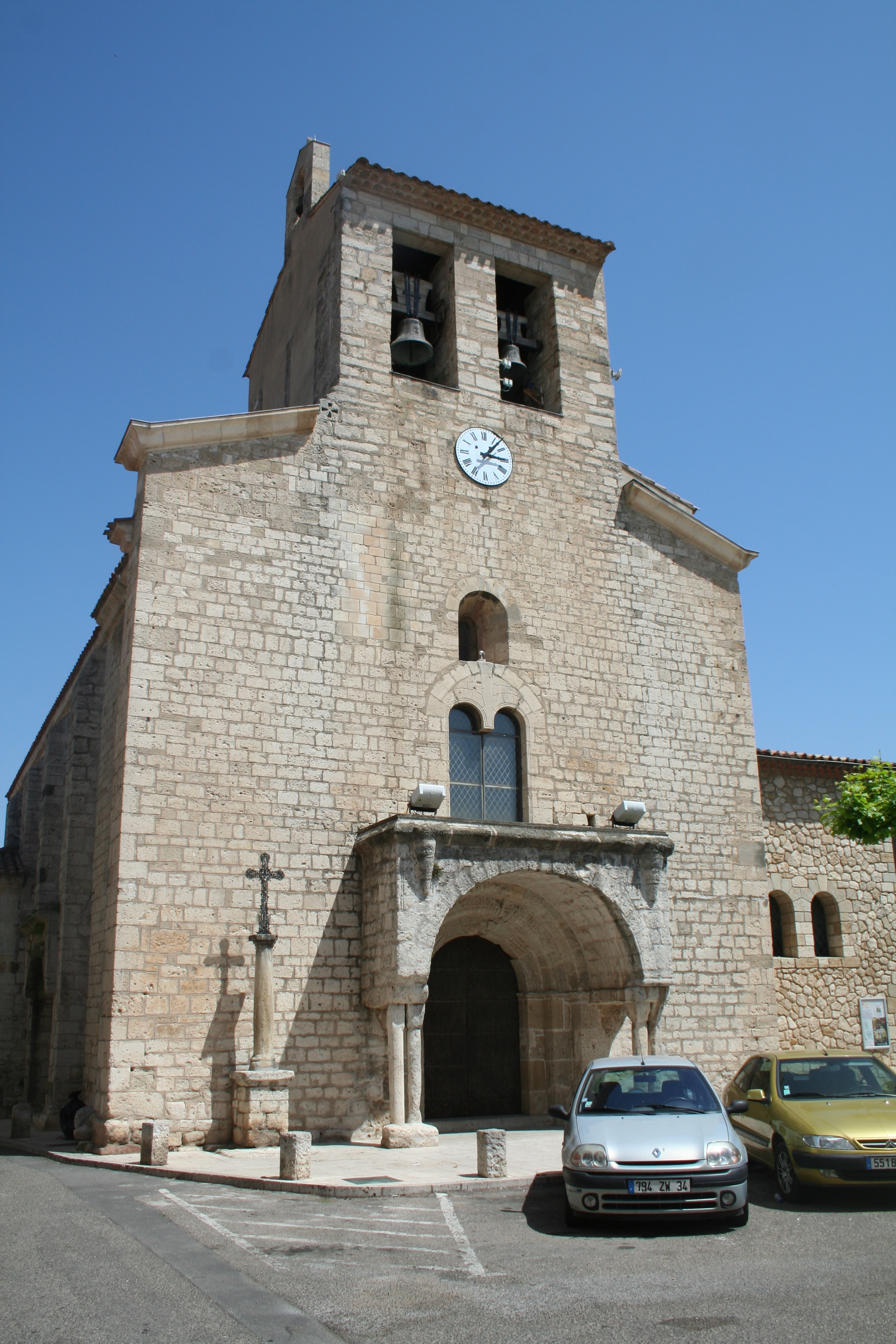
- Church

- Coat of arms
- Location of Magalas
- Location within France Location within Occitanie
- Coordinates: 43°28′19″N 3°13′22″E
- Country: France
- Region: Occitania
- Department: Hérault
- Arrondissement: Béziers
- Canton: Cazouls-lès-Béziers
- Intercommunality: CC Les Avant-Monts

Government
  - Mayor (2020–2026): Jean-Pierre Simo-Cazenave
- Area^{1}: 20.76 km^{2} (8.02 sq mi)
- Elevation: 115 m (377 ft)
- Highest elevation: 201 m (659 ft)
- Lowest elevation: 77 m (253 ft)
- Population (2023): 3,582
  - Density: 172.5/km^{2} (446.9/sq mi)
- Time zone: UTC+01:00 (CET)
  - Summer (DST): UTC+02:00 (CEST)
- INSEE/Postal code: 34147 /34480
- ^{1} French Land Register data, which excludes lakes, ponds, glaciers > 1 km^{2} (0.386 sq mi or 247 acres) and river estuaries.

Magalas (French pronunciation: [maɡalas]; Languedocien: Magalaç) is a commune in the Hérault department in southern France.

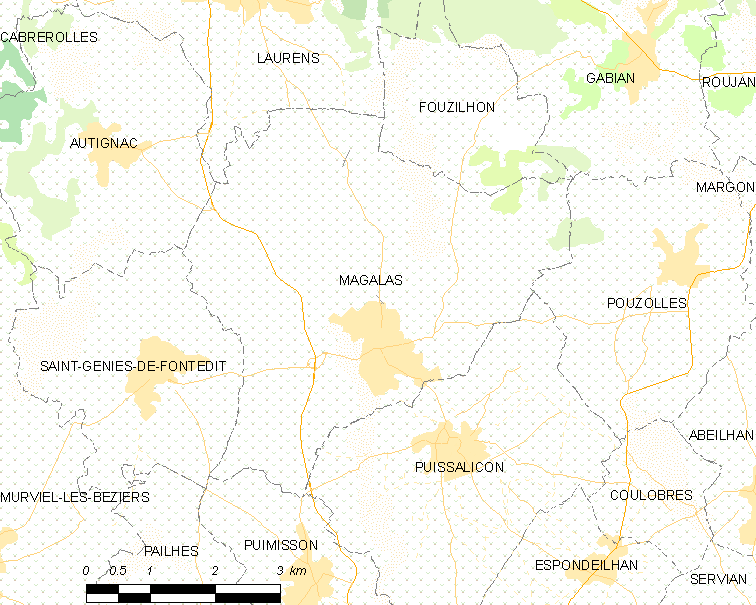
Map

== Population ==
Historical population
Year	Pop.	±% p.a.
1968	1,583	—
1975	1,597	+0.13%
1982	1,604	+0.06%
1990	1,699	+0.72%
1999	1,827	+0.81%
2007	2,576	+4.39%
2012	3,212	+4.51%
2017	3,349	+0.84%
2023	3,582	+1.13%
Source: INSEE

== See also ==
- Communes of the Hérault department
