= Fouzilhon =

- Commune
- Coat of arms
- Location of Fouzilhon
- Location within France Location within Occitanie
- Coordinates: 43°30′09″N 3°14′44″E
- Country: France
- Region: Occitania
- Department: Hérault
- Arrondissement: Béziers
- Canton: Cazouls-lès-Béziers
- Intercommunality: CC Les Avant-Monts

Government
  - Mayor (2020–2026): Lydie Couderc
- Area^{1}: 5.39 km^{2} (2.08 sq mi)
- Elevation: 160 m (520 ft)
- Highest elevation: 214 m (702 ft)
- Lowest elevation: 134 m (440 ft)
- Population (2023): 243
  - Density: 45.1/km^{2} (117/sq mi)
- Time zone: UTC+01:00 (CET)
  - Summer (DST): UTC+02:00 (CEST)
- INSEE/Postal code: 34105 /34480
- ^{1} French Land Register data, which excludes lakes, ponds, glaciers > 1 km^{2} (0.386 sq mi or 247 acres) and river estuaries.

Fouzilhon (French pronunciation: [fuzijɔ̃]; Occitan: Fosilhon) is a commune in the Hérault department in southern France.

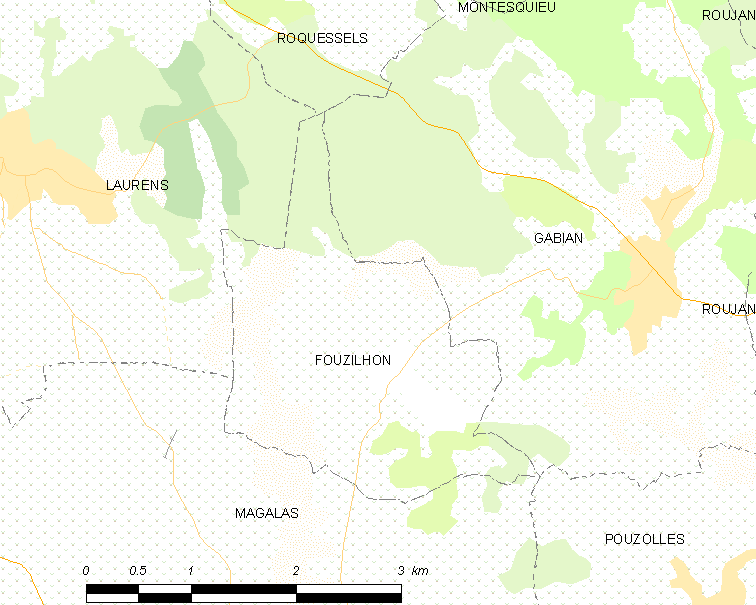
Map

== Population ==
Historical population
Year	Pop.	±% p.a.
1968	162	—
1975	128	−3.31%
1982	143	+1.60%
1990	135	−0.72%
1999	146	+0.87%
2007	192	+3.48%
2012	224	+3.13%
2017	244	+1.73%
2023	243	−0.07%
Source: INSEE

== See also ==
- Communes of the Hérault department
