= Canton of Cazouls-lès-Béziers =

Coordinates: 43.39°N 3.10°E

Cazouls-lès-Béziers
- Canton
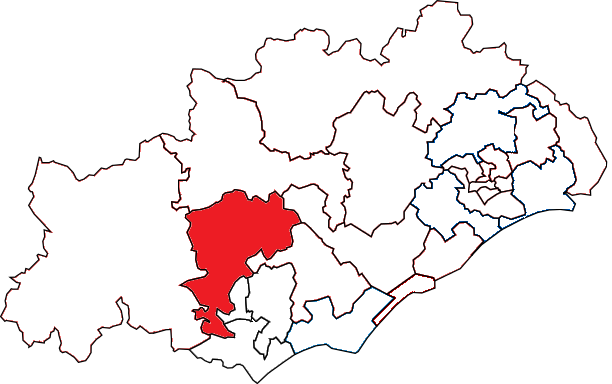
- Interactive map of Cazouls-lès-Béziers
- Country: France
- Region: Occitania
- Department: Hérault
- No. of communes: {{{nbcomm}}}

Government
  - Representatives (2021–2028): Séverine Saur; Philippe Vidal
- Area: 413.99 km^{2} (159.84 sq mi)
- Population (2023): 44,369
  - Density: 107.17/km^{2} (277.58/sq mi)
- INSEE code: 34 05

The canton of Cazouls-lès-Béziers is an administrative division of the Hérault department, southern France. It was created at the French canton reorganisation which came into effect in March 2015. Its seat is in Cazouls-lès-Béziers.

== Composition ==
It consists of the following communes:

1. Autignac
2. Cabrerolles
3. Causses-et-Veyran
4. Caussiniojouls
5. Cazouls-lès-Béziers
6. Colombiers
7. Faugères
8. Fos
9. Fouzilhon
10. Gabian
11. Laurens
12. Magalas
13. Margon
14. Maraussan
15. Maureilhan
16. Montady
17. Montesquieu
18. Murviel-lès-Béziers
19. Neffiès
20. Pailhès
21. Pouzolles
22. Puimisson
23. Roquessels
24. Roujan
25. Saint-Geniès-de-Fontedit
26. Saint-Nazaire-de-Ladarez
27. Thézan-lès-Béziers
28. Vailhan

== Councillors ==
Election	Councillors	Party	Occupation
2015	Catherine Reboul	PS	Councillor of Saint-Geniès-de-Fontedit
2015	Philippe Vidal	PS	Mayor of Cazouls-lès-Béziers
2021	Séverine Saur	PS	Mayor of Cabrerolles
2021	Philippe Vidal	PS	Mayor of Cazouls-lès-Béziers

== Pictures of the canton ==
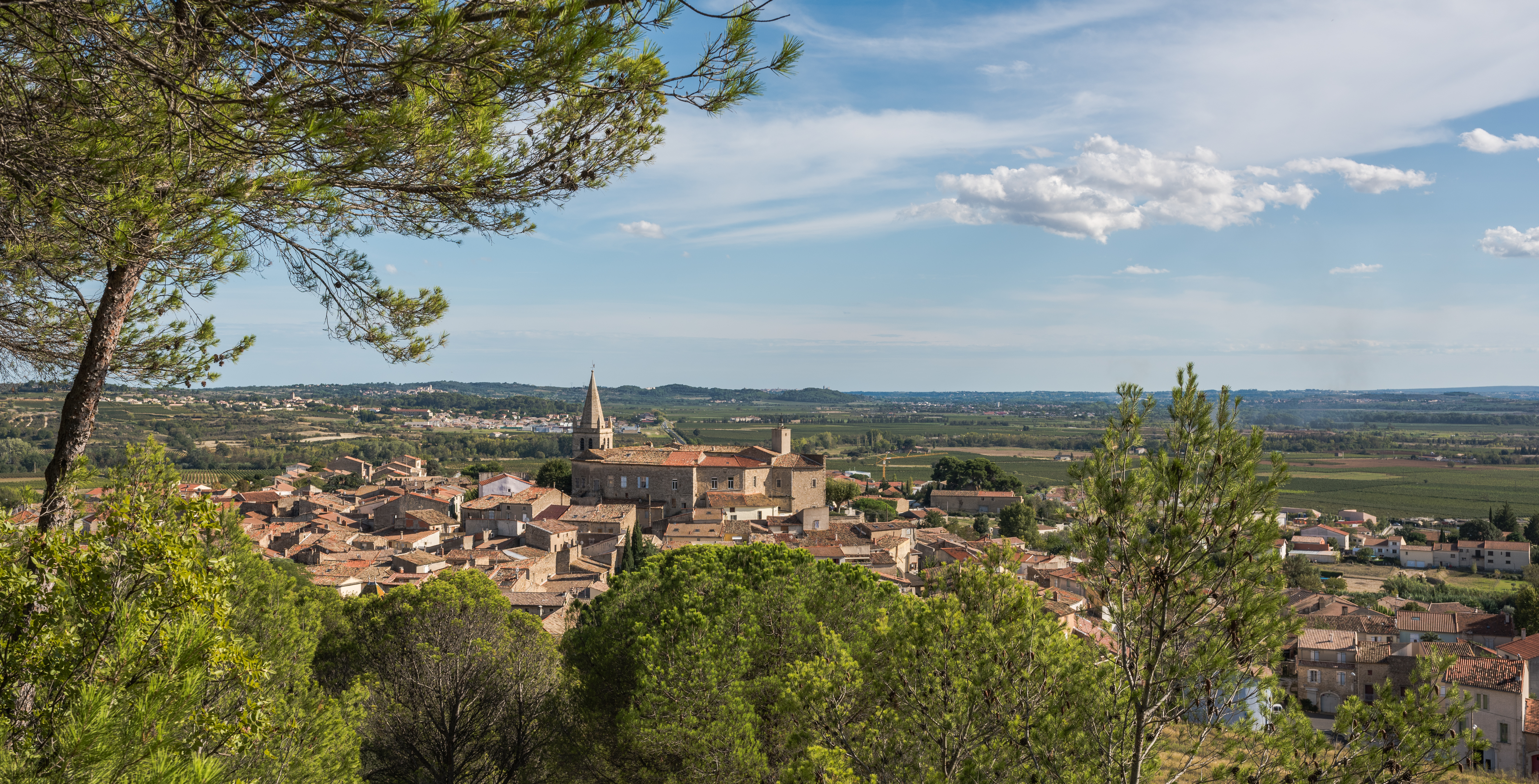
View of Murviel-lès-Béziers

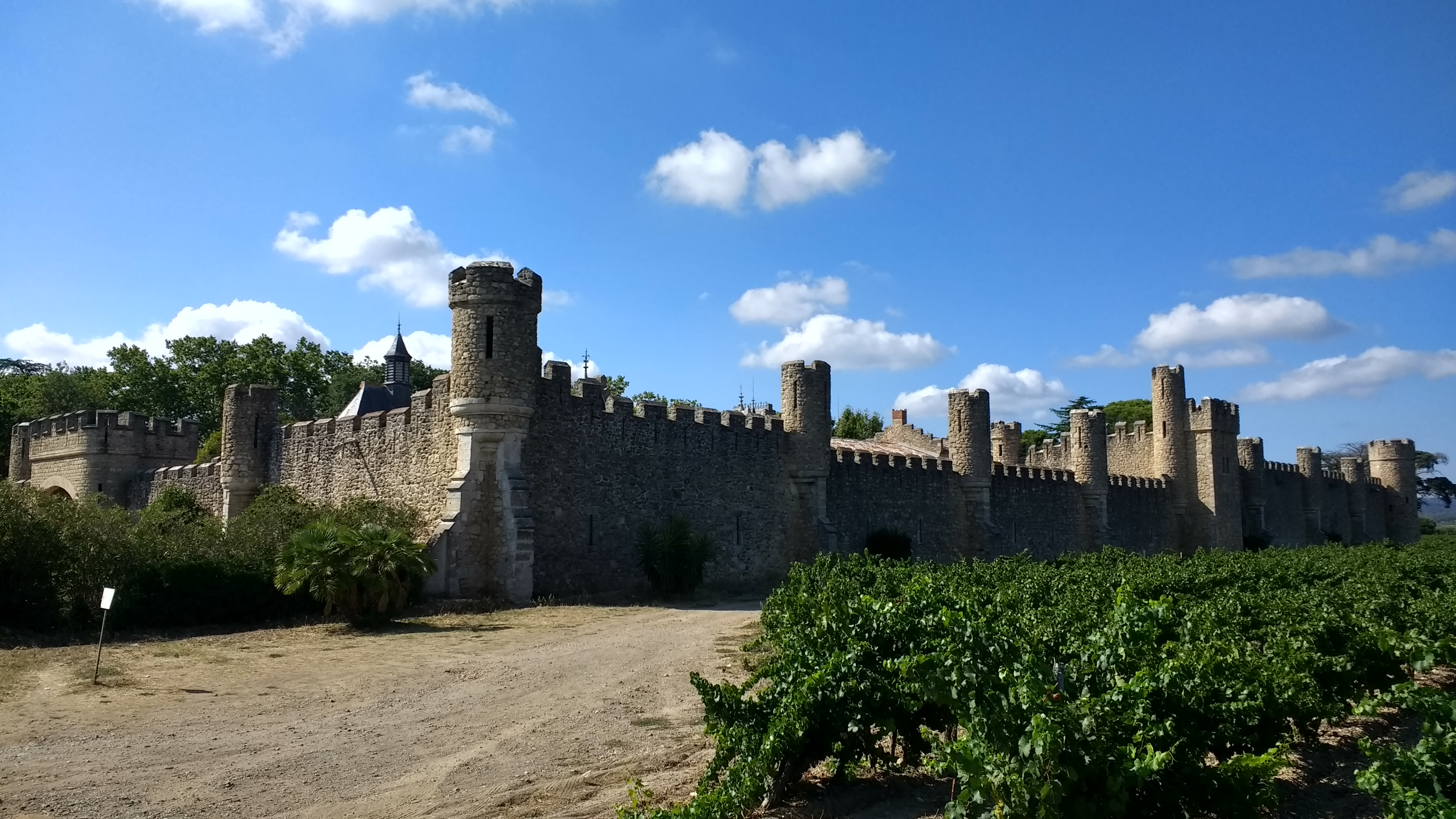
Castle Grézan in Laurens

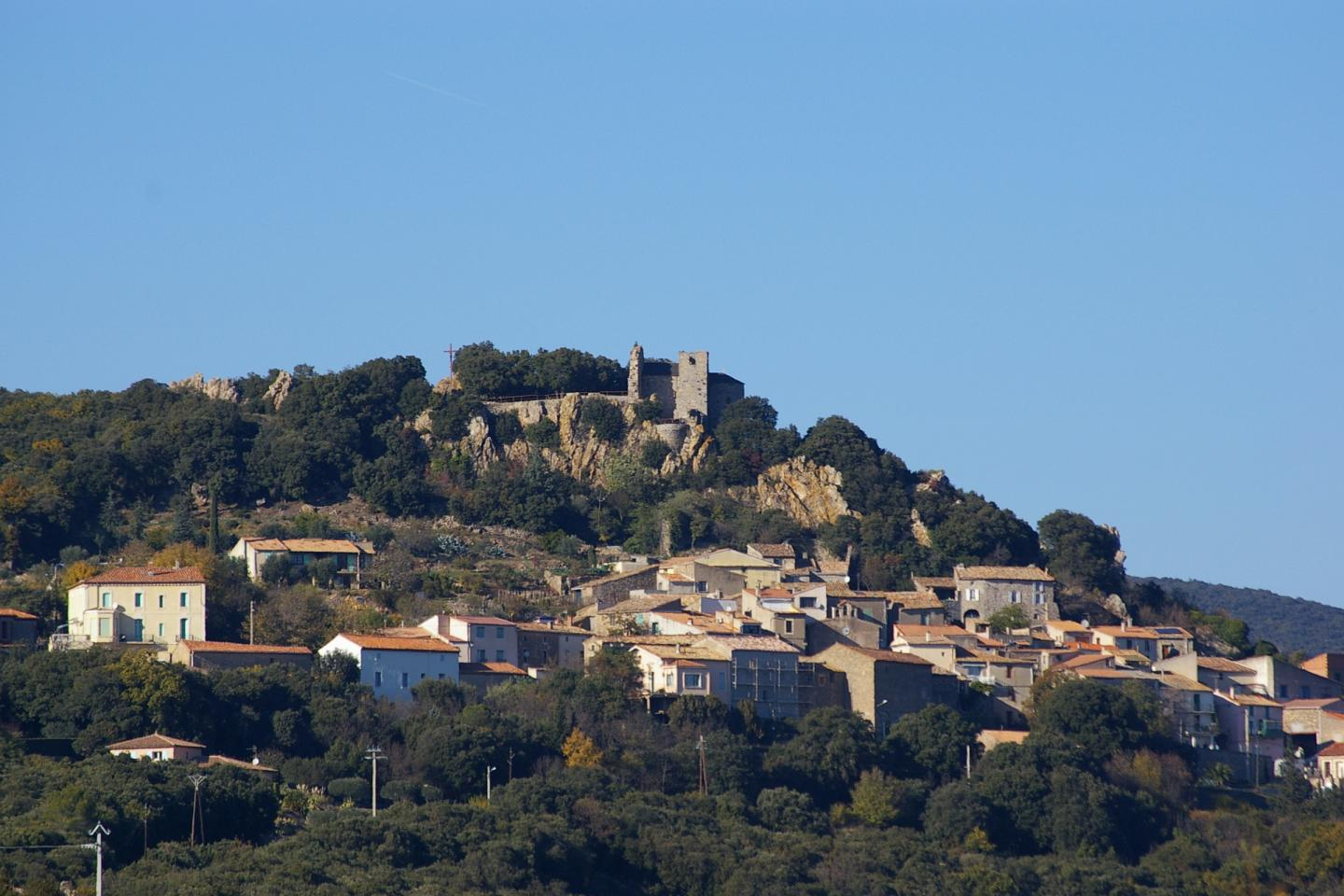
View of Roquessels
