= Faugères, Hérault =

Faugères
- Commune
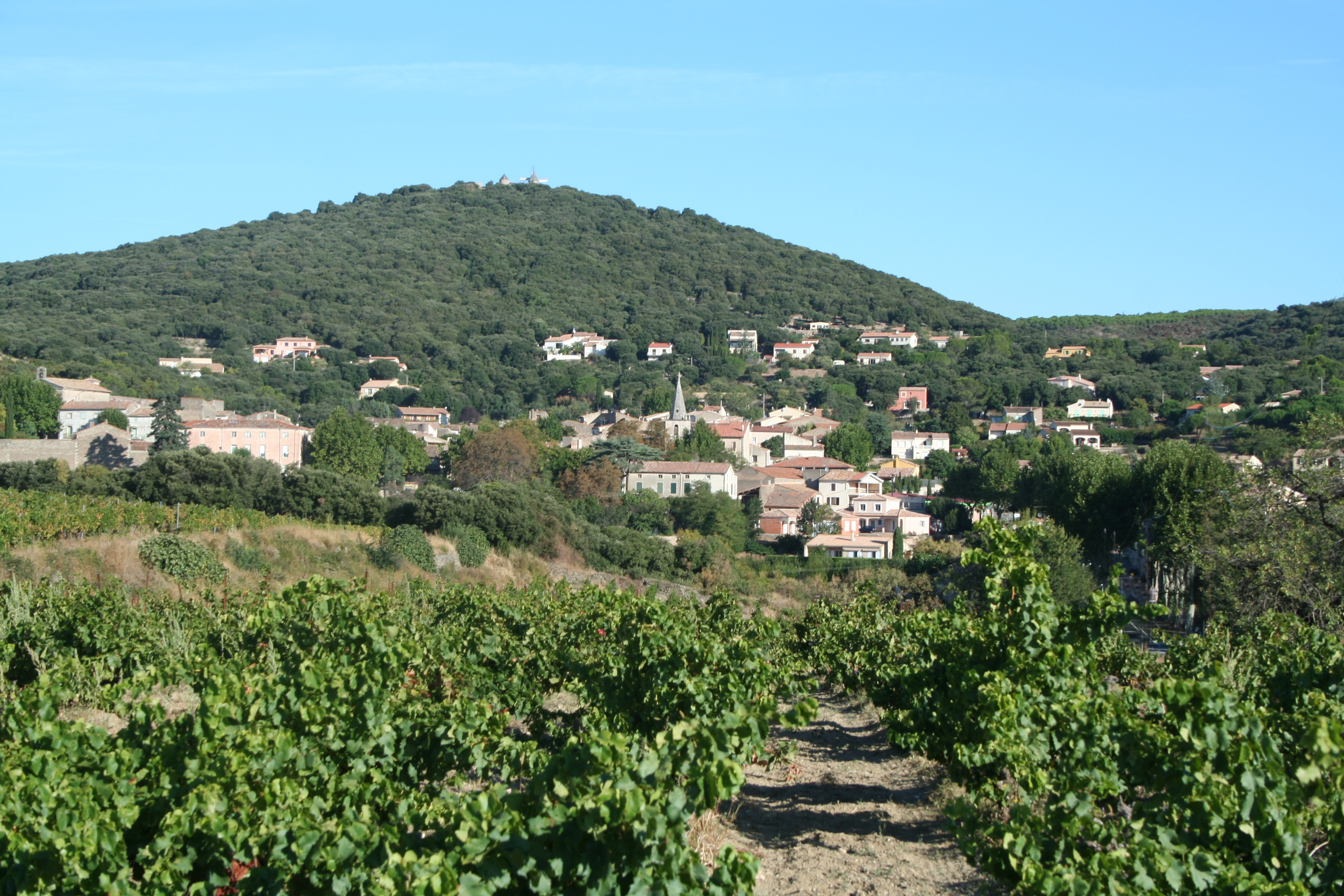
- Faugères with vineyards in the foreground

- Coat of arms
- Location of Faugères
- Location within France Location within Occitanie
- Coordinates: 43°33′59″N 3°11′24″E
- Country: France
- Region: Occitania
- Department: Hérault
- Arrondissement: Béziers
- Canton: Cazouls-lès-Béziers
- Intercommunality: CC Les Avant-Monts

Government
  - Mayor (2020–2026): Philippe Bouche
- Area^{1}: 26.06 km^{2} (10.06 sq mi)
- Elevation: 250 m (820 ft)
- Highest elevation: 544 m (1,785 ft)
- Lowest elevation: 170 m (560 ft)
- Population (2023): 548
  - Density: 21.0/km^{2} (54.5/sq mi)
- Time zone: UTC+01:00 (CET)
  - Summer (DST): UTC+02:00 (CEST)
- INSEE/Postal code: 34096 /34600
- ^{1} French Land Register data, which excludes lakes, ponds, glaciers > 1 km^{2} (0.386 sq mi or 247 acres) and river estuaries.

Faugères (French pronunciation: [foʒɛʁ]; Languedocien: Faugièiras) is a commune in the Hérault department in southern France.

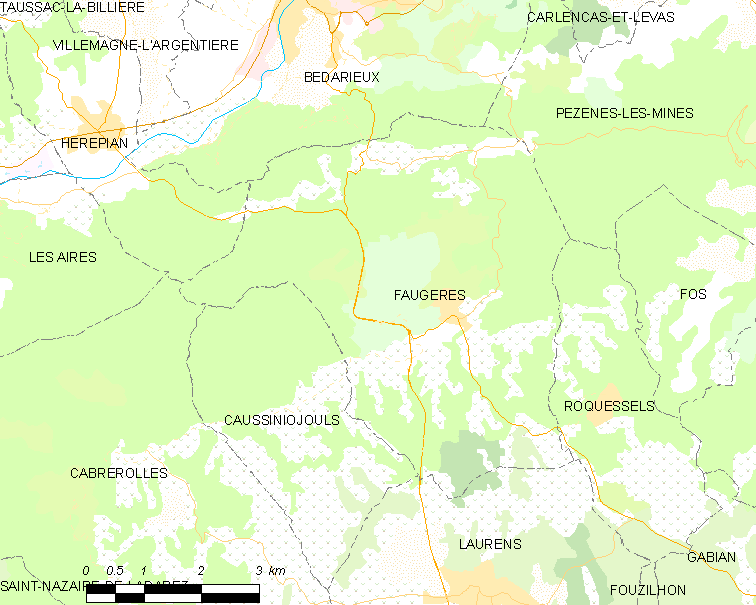
Map

Faugères is known for its wine, Faugères AOC.

Faugères is also known for the old windmills that overlook the village from a nearby hill to the north. One of the windmills has now been restored using ancient techniques and may be seen in operation between June and September.

== History ==
The castle of Faugères dates back to at least 1030AD, but it was heavily damaged during the Wars of Religion and today only small sections of the keep, the watch tower and castle wall remain.

Four Protestant churches have existed in Faugères over time and two remain today. The most recently built church dates from 1837 and was built with stones taken from the old castle ruins.

In the hills around Faugères are many capitelles, round dry-stone shelters with vaulted roofs, built to protect shepherds and farmers from the elements. These are many centuries old.

== Population ==
Historical population
Year	Pop.	±% p.a.
1968	380	—
1975	359	−0.81%
1982	366	+0.28%
1990	360	−0.21%
1999	438	+2.20%
2007	467	+0.80%
2012	542	+3.02%
2017	515	−1.02%
2023	548	+1.04%
Source: INSEE

== Personalities ==
- Claude Abbes

== See also ==
- Communes of the Hérault department
