= Roujan =

- Commune
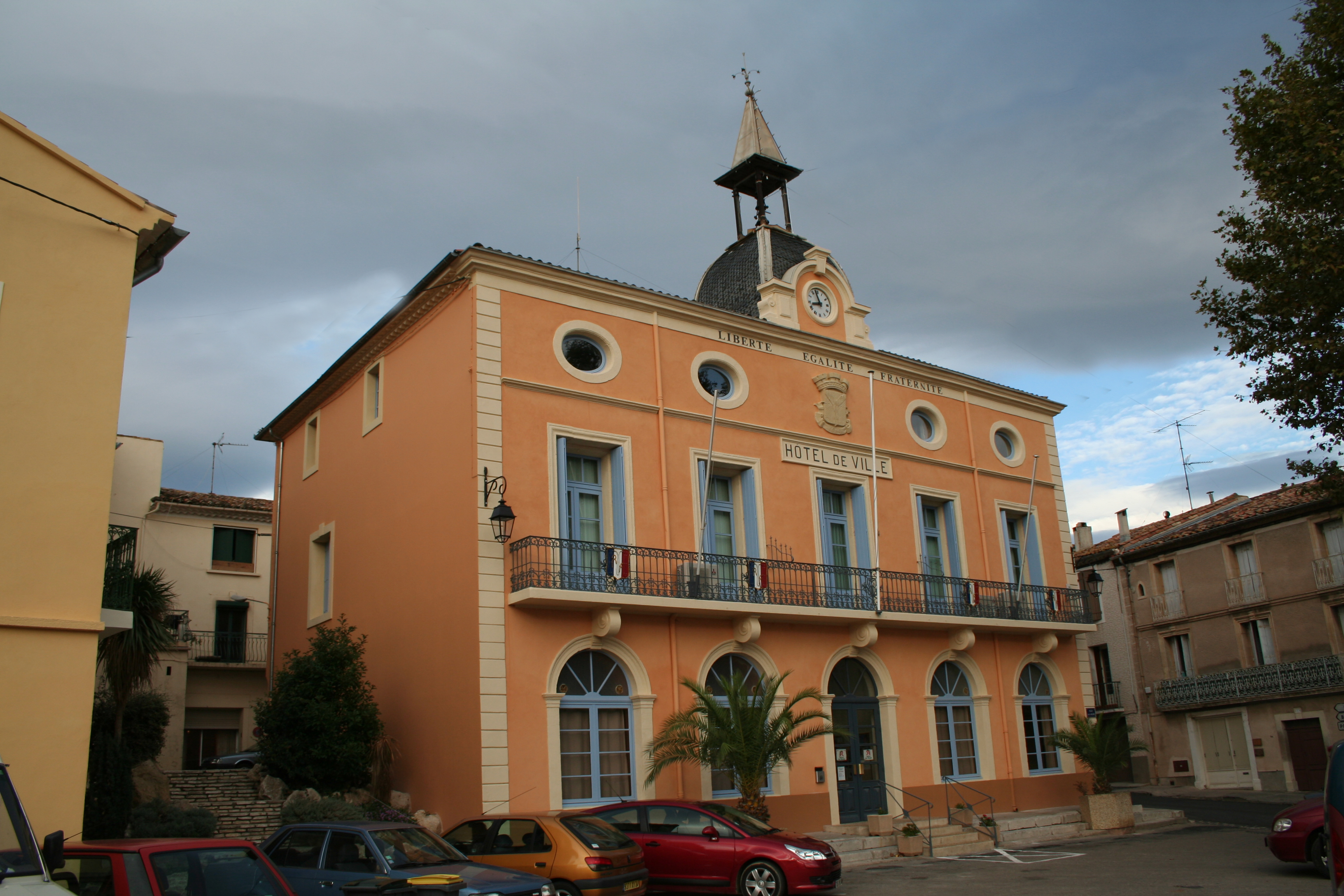
- Town hall

- Coat of arms
- Location of Roujan
- Location within France Location within Occitanie
- Coordinates: 43°30′20″N 3°18′41″E
- Country: France
- Region: Occitania
- Department: Hérault
- Arrondissement: Béziers
- Canton: Cazouls-lès-Béziers
- Intercommunality: CC Les Avant-Monts

Government
  - Mayor (2020–2026): Jean Blanquefort
- Area^{1}: 17.02 km^{2} (6.57 sq mi)
- Elevation: 115 m (377 ft)
- Highest elevation: 246 m (807 ft)
- Lowest elevation: 49 m (161 ft)
- Population (2023): 2,336
  - Density: 137.3/km^{2} (355.5/sq mi)
- Time zone: UTC+01:00 (CET)
  - Summer (DST): UTC+02:00 (CEST)
- INSEE/Postal code: 34237 /34320
- ^{1} French Land Register data, which excludes lakes, ponds, glaciers > 1 km^{2} (0.386 sq mi or 247 acres) and river estuaries.

Roujan (French pronunciation: [ʁuʒɑ̃]; Occitan: Rojan) is a commune in the Hérault department in the Occitanie region in southern France, about 22 km north of Beziers.

== Sights ==
Cassan Abbey, an 18th-century historical monument is located in the commune on the road to Faugères.

== Population ==
Historical population
Year	Pop.	±% p.a.
1968	1,481	—
1975	1,379	−1.01%
1982	1,409	+0.31%
1990	1,366	−0.39%
1999	1,486	+0.94%
2007	1,902	+3.13%
2012	1,954	+0.54%
2017	2,158	+2.01%
2023	2,336	+1.33%
Source: INSEE

== Personalities ==
- Jules Roucairol, victim of Napoléon III's coup d'état

== See also ==
- Communes of the Hérault department
