= Montesquieu, Hérault =

Montesquieu
- Commune
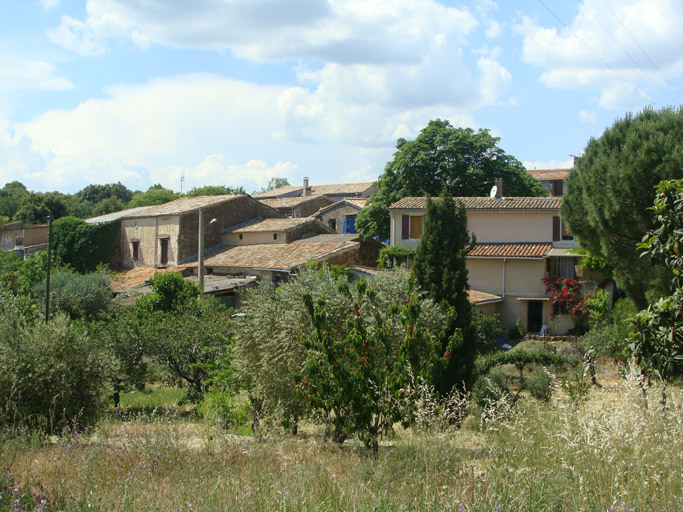

- Coat of arms
- Location of Montesquieu
- Location within France Location within Occitanie
- Coordinates: 43°33′45″N 3°16′36″E
- Country: France
- Region: Occitania
- Department: Hérault
- Arrondissement: Béziers
- Canton: Cazouls-lès-Béziers
- Intercommunality: CC Les Avant-Monts

Government
  - Mayor (2020–2026): Francis Castan
- Area^{1}: 14.47 km^{2} (5.59 sq mi)
- Elevation: 150 m (490 ft)
- Highest elevation: 467 m (1,532 ft)
- Lowest elevation: 140 m (460 ft)
- Population (2023): 75
  - Density: 5.2/km^{2} (13/sq mi)
- Time zone: UTC+01:00 (CET)
  - Summer (DST): UTC+02:00 (CEST)
- INSEE/Postal code: 34168 /34320
- ^{1} French Land Register data, which excludes lakes, ponds, glaciers > 1 km^{2} (0.386 sq mi or 247 acres) and river estuaries.

Montesquieu (French pronunciation: [mɔ̃tɛskjø]; Languedocien: Montesquiu) is a commune in the Hérault department in the Occitanie region in southern France.

== Geography ==
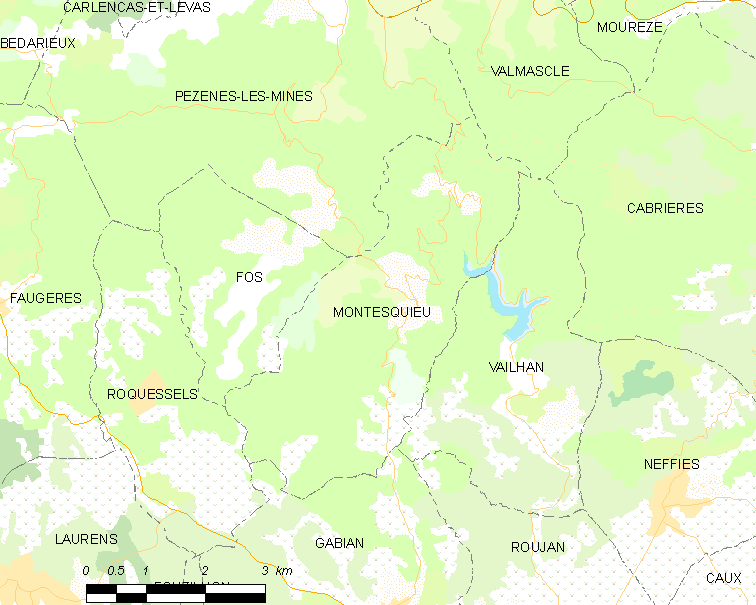
Map

The original village of Montesquieu is in ruins. The commune has a number of hamlets: Mas Rolland, which has the town hall and the old school, Paders, near the valley of the Peyne, Fournols to the north of the commune and Valuzières towards the middle.

== Population ==
Historical population
Year	Pop.	±% p.a.
1968	53	—
1975	35	−5.76%
1982	38	+1.18%
1990	47	+2.69%
1999	47	+0.00%
2007	58	+2.66%
2012	65	+2.31%
2017	70	+1.49%
2023	75	+1.16%
Source: INSEE

== See also ==
- Communes of the Hérault department
