= Vailhan =

- Commune
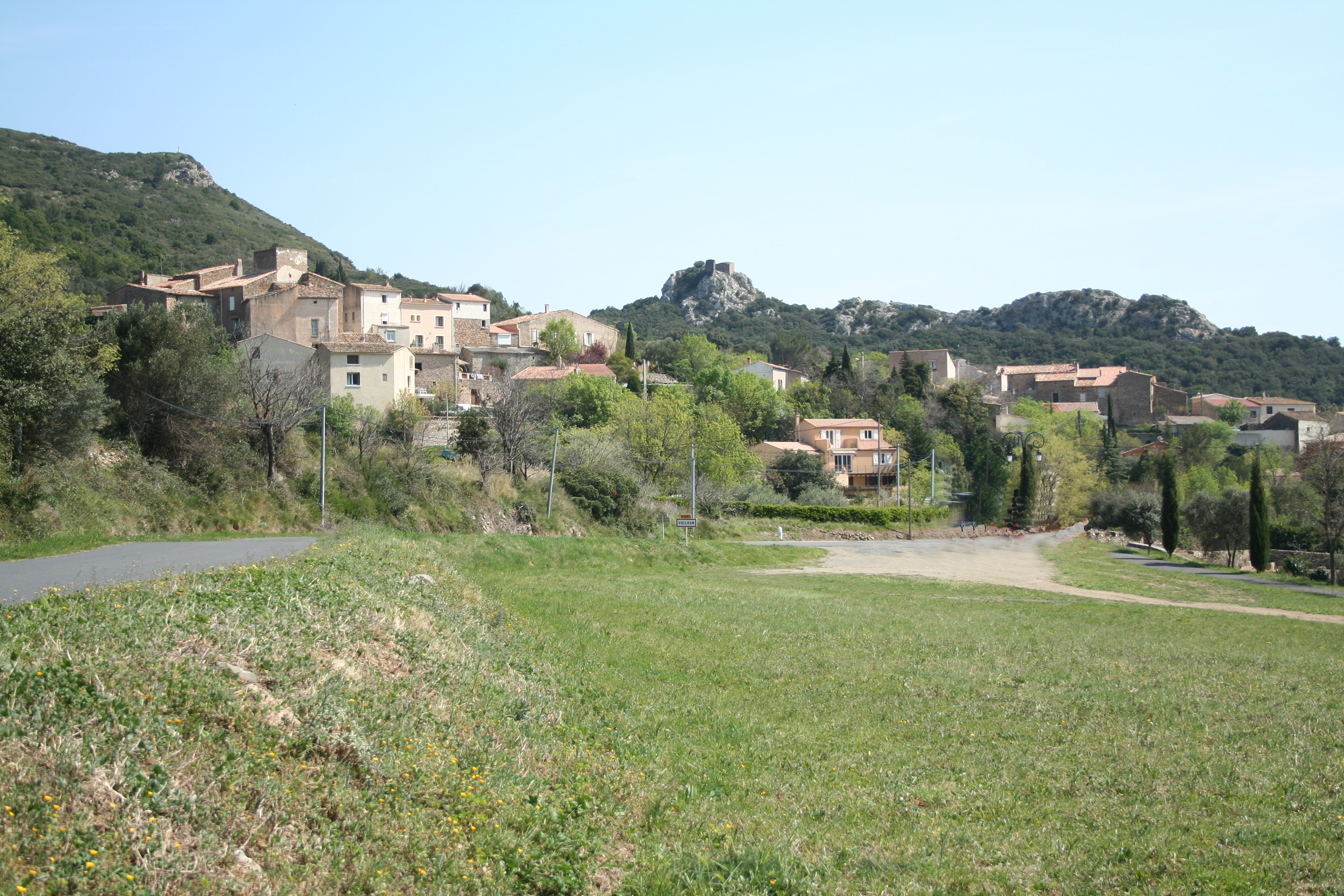
- A general view of Vailhan

- Coat of arms
- Location of Vailhan
- Location within France Location within Occitanie
- Coordinates: 43°33′12″N 3°18′12″E
- Country: France
- Region: Occitania
- Department: Hérault
- Arrondissement: Béziers
- Canton: Cazouls-lès-Béziers
- Intercommunality: CC Les Avant-Monts

Government
  - Mayor (2020–2026): Jean-Michel Ulmer
- Area^{1}: 11.23 km^{2} (4.34 sq mi)
- Elevation: 180 m (590 ft)
- Highest elevation: 460 m (1,510 ft)
- Lowest elevation: 93 m (305 ft)
- Population (2023): 142
  - Density: 12.6/km^{2} (32.7/sq mi)
- Time zone: UTC+01:00 (CET)
  - Summer (DST): UTC+02:00 (CEST)
- INSEE/Postal code: 34319 /34320
- ^{1} French Land Register data, which excludes lakes, ponds, glaciers > 1 km^{2} (0.386 sq mi or 247 acres) and river estuaries.

Vailhan (French pronunciation: [vajɑ̃]; Occitan: Valhan) is a commune in the Hérault department in the Occitanie region in southern France.

== Population ==
Historical population
| Year | Pop. | ±% p.a. |
|---|---|---|
| 1968 | 116 | — |
| 1975 | 105 | −1.41% |
| 1982 | 127 | +2.75% |
| 1990 | 132 | +0.48% |
| 1999 | 120 | −1.05% |
| 2007 | 161 | +3.74% |
| 2012 | 173 | +1.45% |
| 2017 | 158 | −1.80% |
| 2023 | 142 | −1.76% |
Source: INSEE

== Images ==
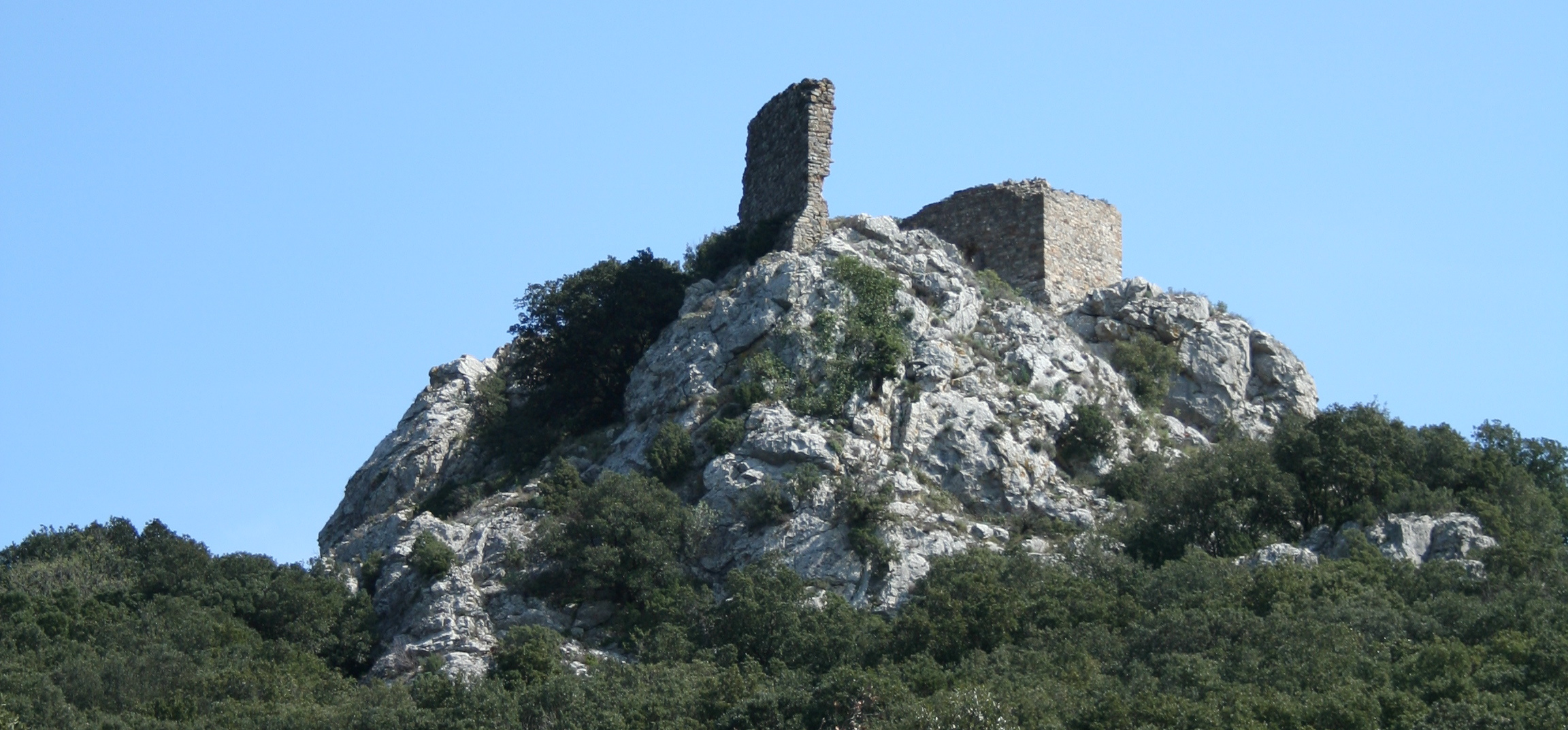
Castle.

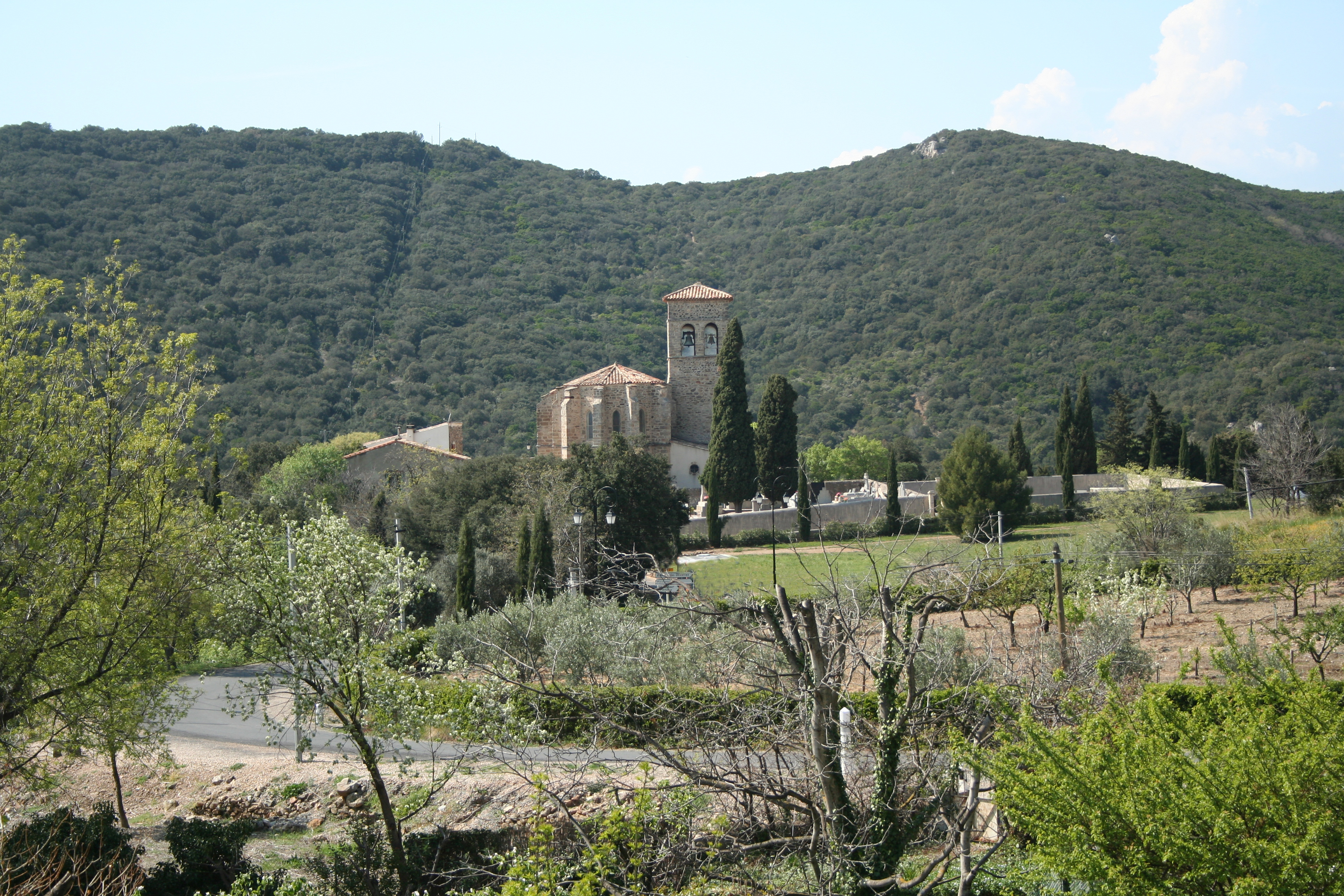
Church of Notre Dame

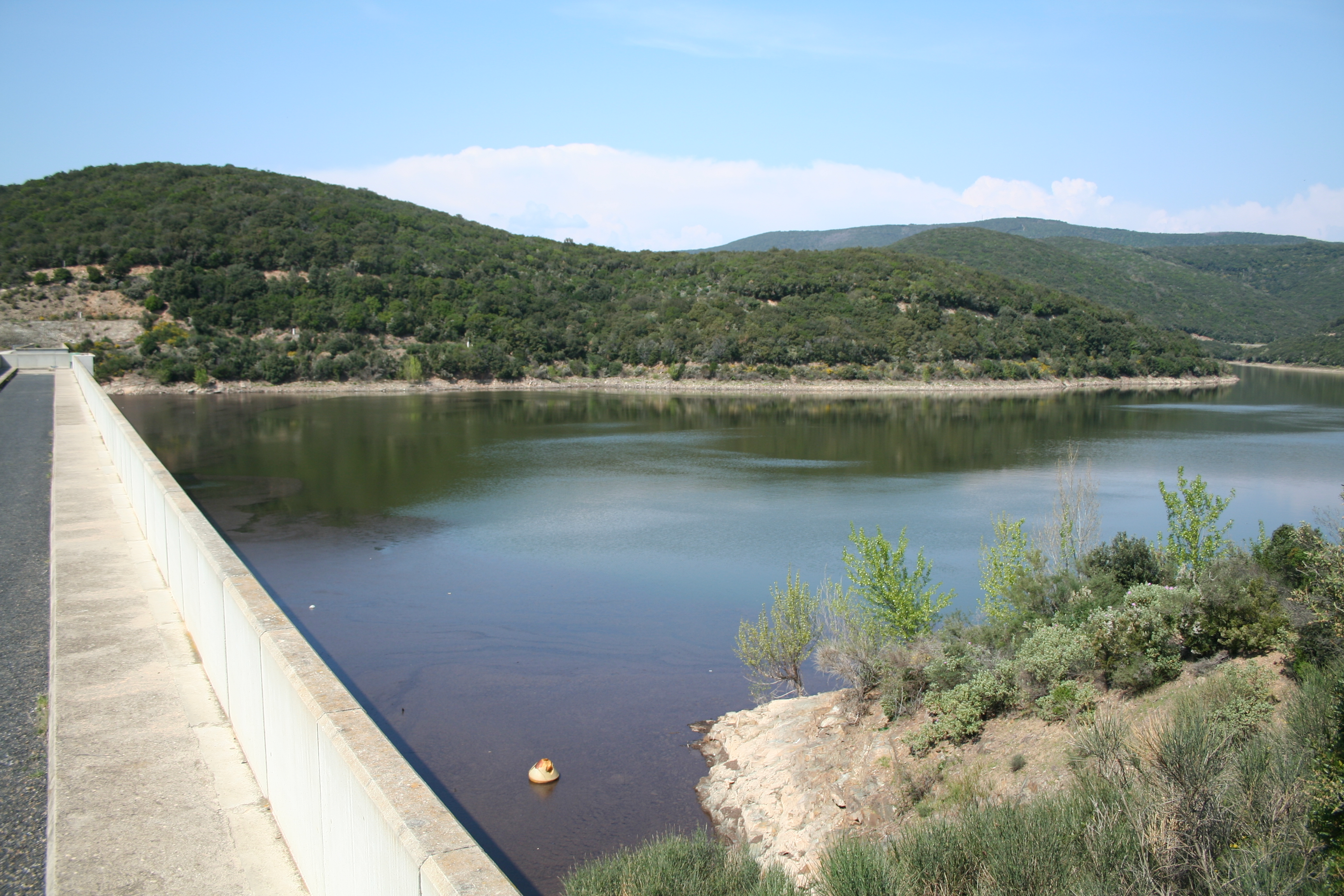
Lake of Olivettes

== See also ==
- Communes of the Hérault department
