= Gabian =

- Commune
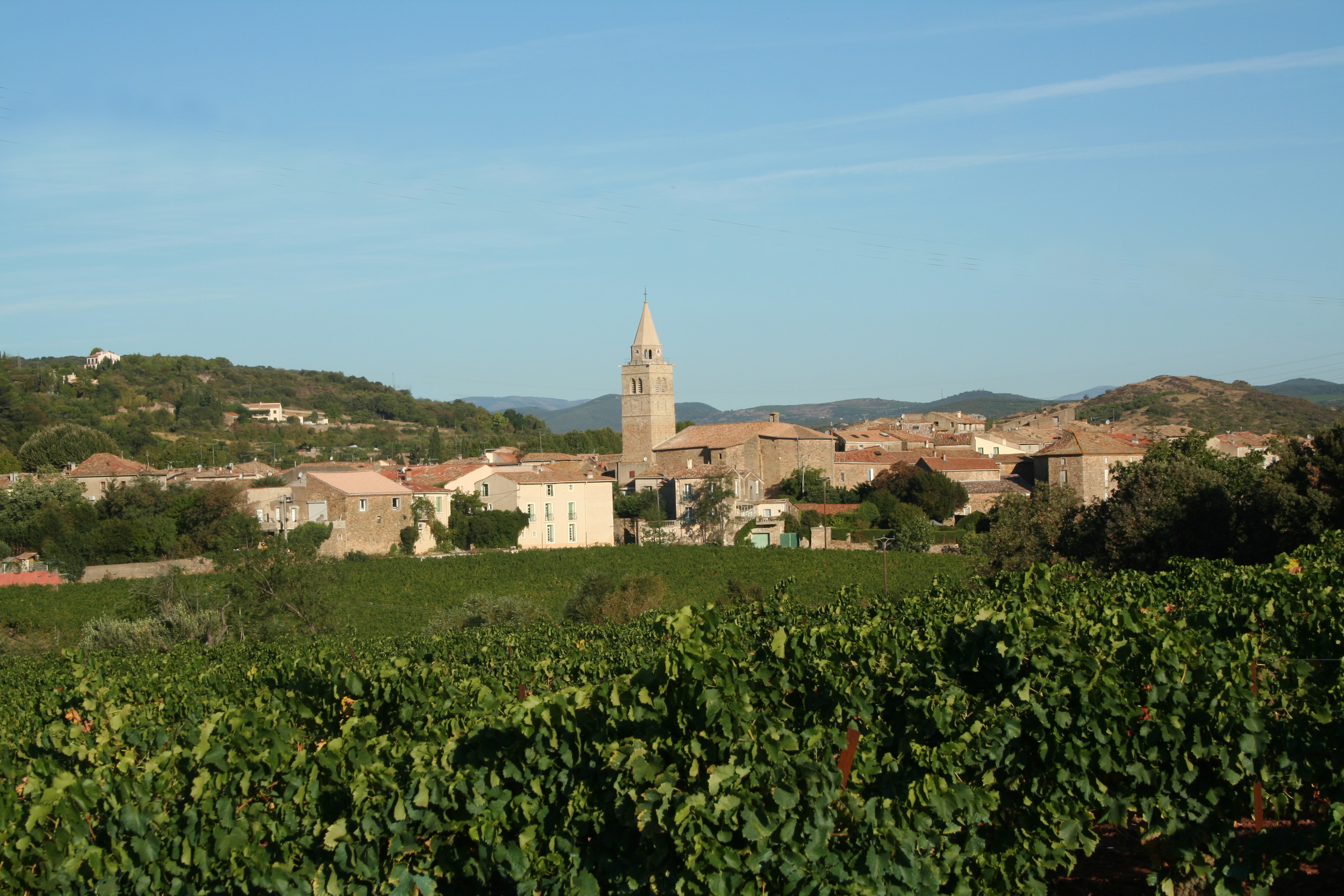
- View of Gabian

- Coat of arms
- Location of Gabian
- Location within France Location within Occitanie
- Coordinates: 43°30′52″N 3°16′25″E
- Country: France
- Region: Occitania
- Department: Hérault
- Arrondissement: Béziers
- Canton: Cazouls-lès-Béziers
- Intercommunality: Les Avant-Monts

Government
  - Mayor (2020–2026): Francis Boutes
- Area^{1}: 15.96 km^{2} (6.16 sq mi)
- Elevation: 121 m (397 ft)
- Highest elevation: 260 m (850 ft)
- Lowest elevation: 82 m (269 ft)
- Population (2023): 886
  - Density: 55.5/km^{2} (144/sq mi)
- Time zone: UTC+01:00 (CET)
  - Summer (DST): UTC+02:00 (CEST)
- INSEE/Postal code: 34109 /34320
- ^{1} French Land Register data, which excludes lakes, ponds, glaciers > 1 km^{2} (0.386 sq mi or 247 acres) and river estuaries.

Gabian (French pronunciation: [ɡabjɑ̃]) is a commune in the Hérault département in Occitanie in southern France.

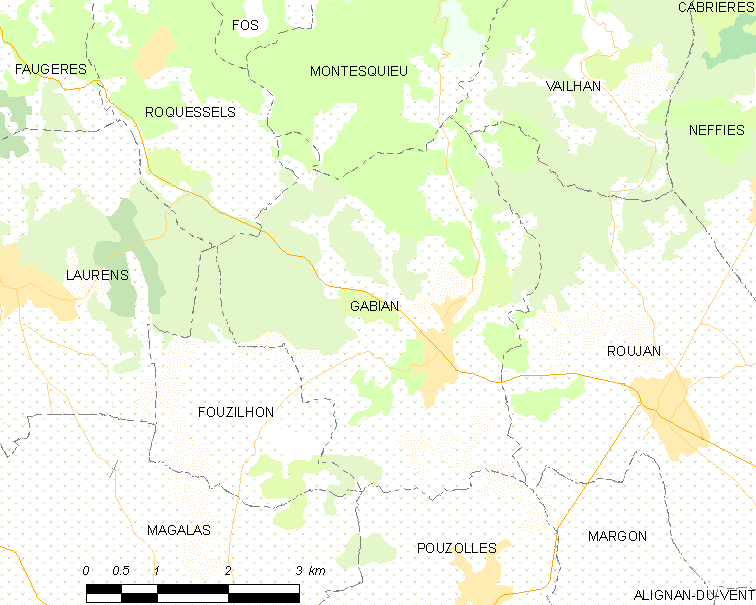
Map

== Population ==
Historical population
Year	Pop.	±% p.a.
1968	780	—
1975	743	−0.69%
1982	640	−2.11%
1990	651	+0.21%
1999	659	+0.14%
2007	786	+2.23%
2012	827	+1.02%
2017	841	+0.34%
2023	886	+0.87%
Source: INSEE

== Panorama ==
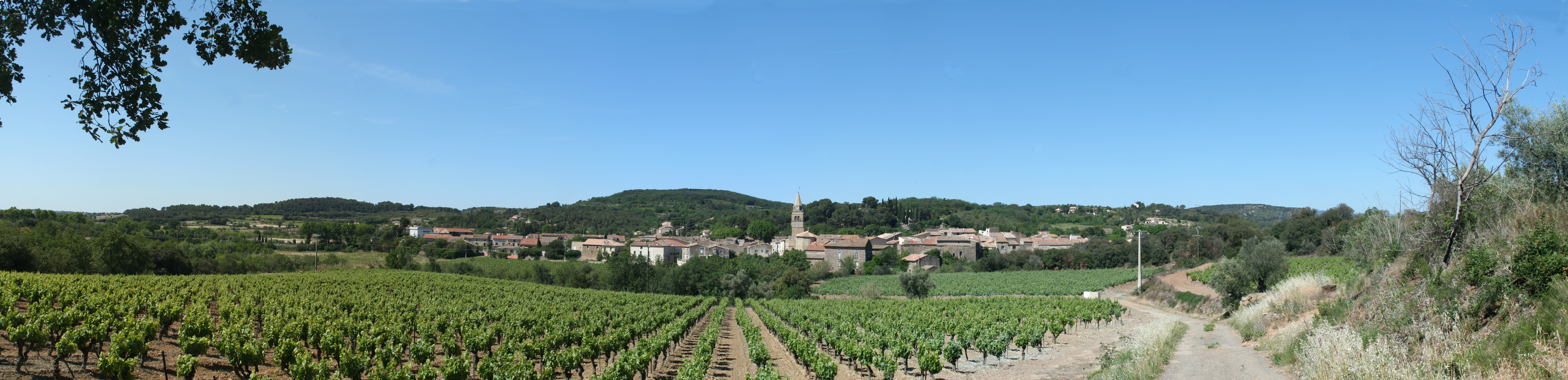

== See also ==
- Communes of the Hérault department
