= Margon, Hérault =

Margon
- Commune
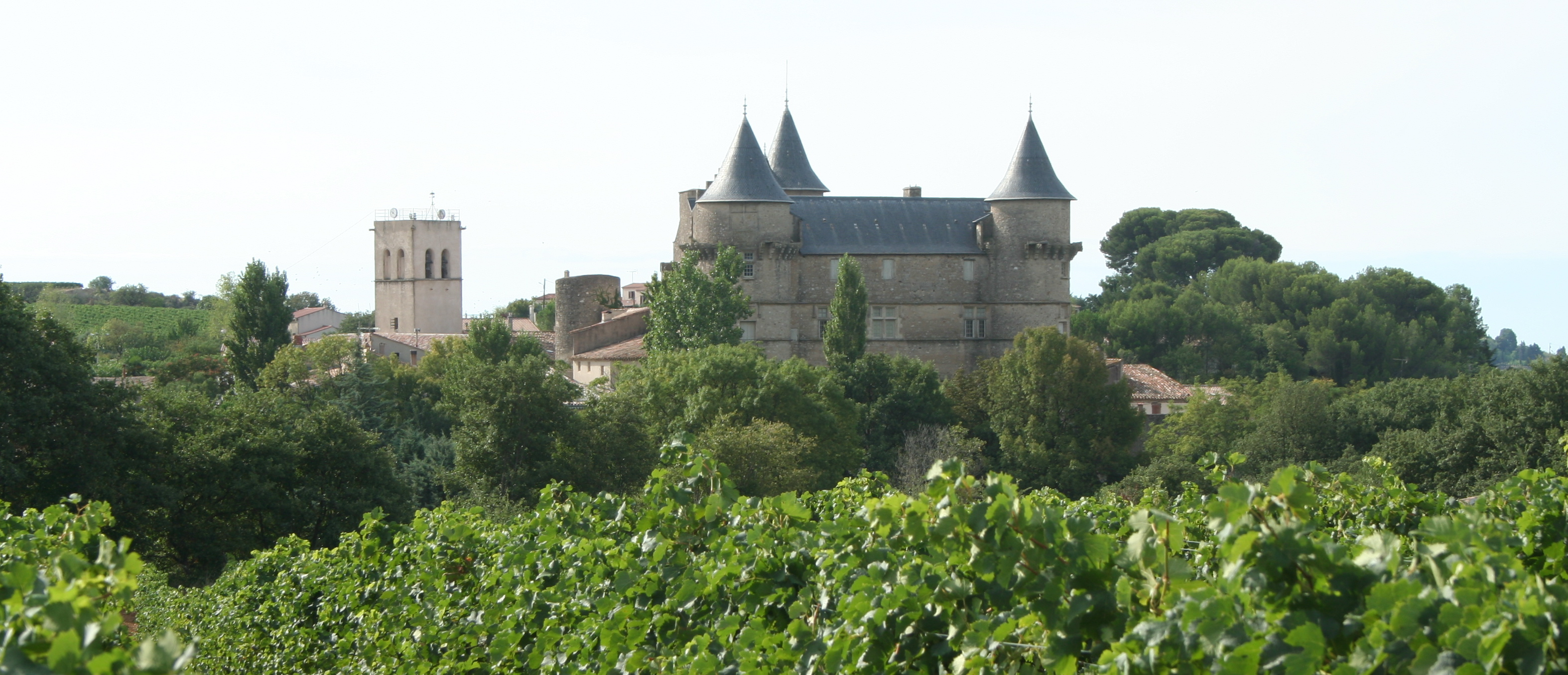
- Margon

- Coat of arms
- Location of Margon
- Location within France Location within Occitanie
- Coordinates: 43°29′16″N 3°18′27″E
- Country: France
- Region: Occitania
- Department: Hérault
- Arrondissement: Béziers
- Canton: Cazouls-lès-Béziers
- Intercommunality: CC Les Avant-Monts

Government
  - Mayor (2023–2026): Joël Ries
- Area^{1}: 4.47 km^{2} (1.73 sq mi)
- Elevation: 50 m (160 ft)
- Highest elevation: 125 m (410 ft)
- Lowest elevation: 57 m (187 ft)
- Population (2023): 778
  - Density: 174/km^{2} (451/sq mi)
- Time zone: UTC+01:00 (CET)
  - Summer (DST): UTC+02:00 (CEST)
- INSEE/Postal code: 34149 /34320
- ^{1} French Land Register data, which excludes lakes, ponds, glaciers > 1 km^{2} (0.386 sq mi or 247 acres) and river estuaries.

Margon (French pronunciation: [maʁɡɔ̃]) is a commune in the Hérault department in southern France.

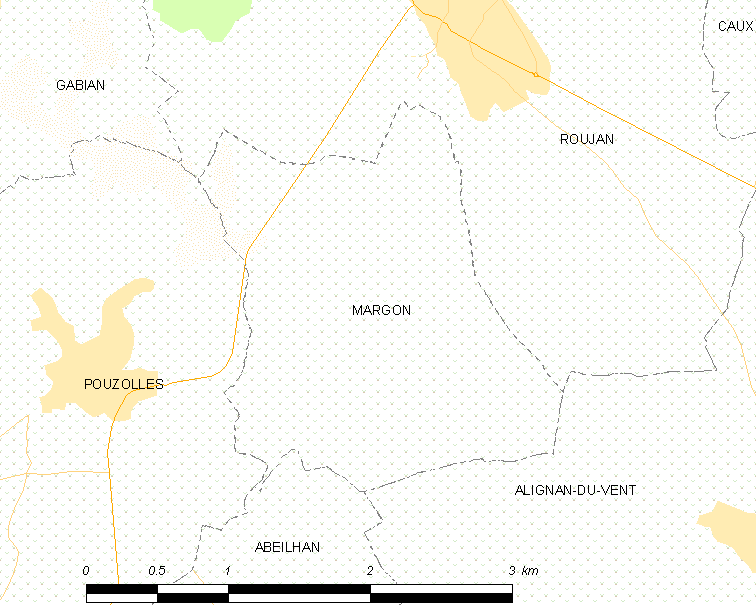
Map

== Population ==
Historical population
Year	Pop.	±% p.a.
1968	202	—
1975	168	−2.60%
1982	156	−1.05%
1990	209	+3.72%
1999	244	+1.74%
2007	319	+3.41%
2012	588	+13.01%
2017	703	+3.64%
2023	778	+1.70%
Source: INSEE

== See also ==
- Communes of the Hérault department
