= Neffiès =

- Commune
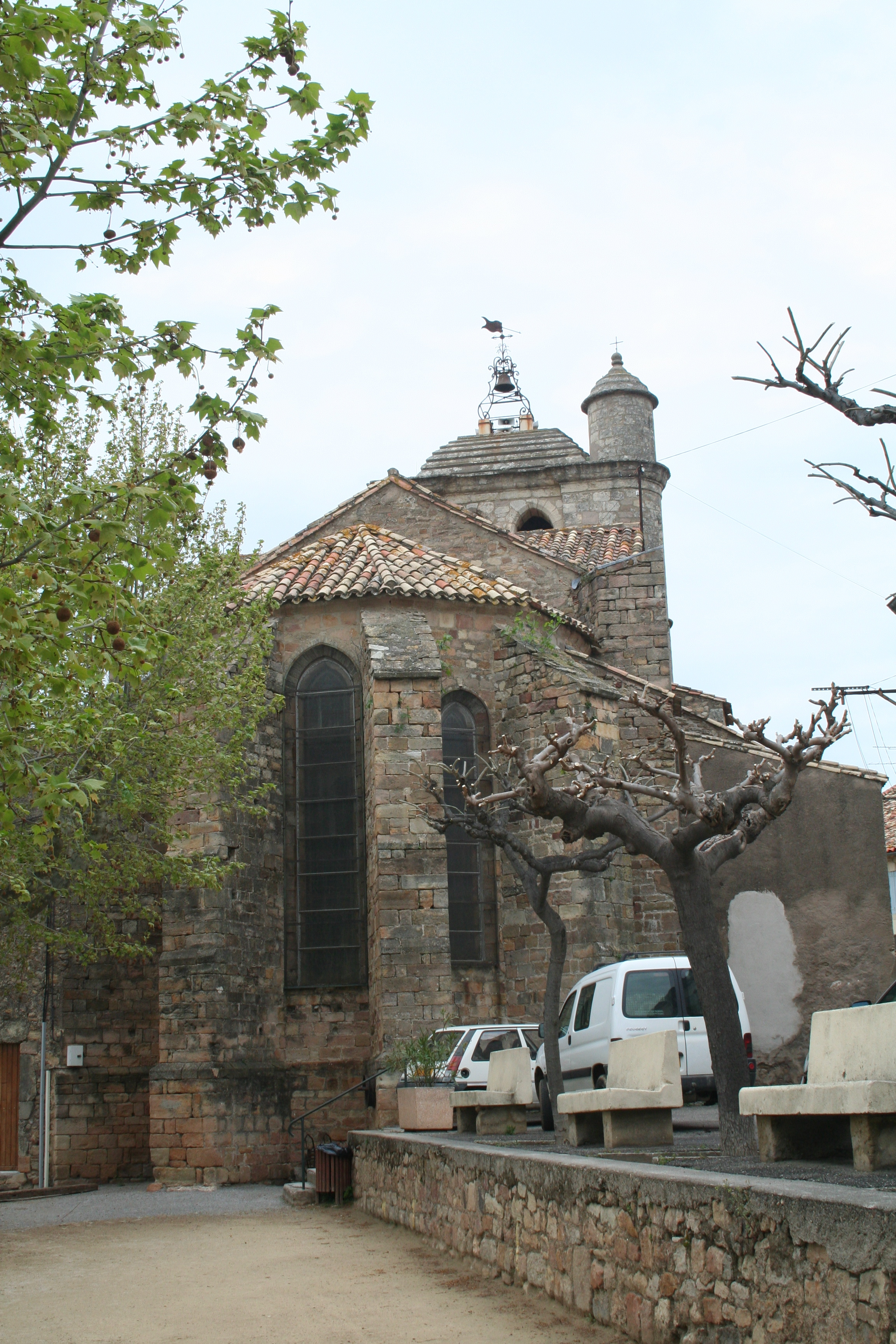
- St. Alban's Church

- Coat of arms
- Location of Neffiès
- Location within France Location within Occitanie
- Coordinates: 43°32′05″N 3°19′50″E
- Country: France
- Region: Occitania
- Department: Hérault
- Arrondissement: Béziers
- Canton: Cazouls-lès-Béziers
- Intercommunality: CC Les Avant-Monts

Government
  - Mayor (2020–2026): David Astruc
- Area^{1}: 10.92 km^{2} (4.22 sq mi)
- Elevation: 88 m (289 ft)
- Highest elevation: 327 m (1,073 ft)
- Lowest elevation: 74 m (243 ft)
- Population (2023): 1,008
  - Density: 92.31/km^{2} (239.1/sq mi)
- Time zone: UTC+01:00 (CET)
  - Summer (DST): UTC+02:00 (CEST)
- INSEE/Postal code: 34181 /34320
- ^{1} French Land Register data, which excludes lakes, ponds, glaciers > 1 km^{2} (0.386 sq mi or 247 acres) and river estuaries.

Neffiès (French pronunciation: [nɛfjɛs]; Languedocien: Nefiès) is a commune in the Hérault department in the Occitanie region in southern France.

== Population ==
Historical population
| Year | Pop. | ±% p.a. |
|---|---|---|
| 1968 | 632 | — |
| 1975 | 578 | −1.27% |
| 1982 | 563 | −0.37% |
| 1990 | 620 | +1.21% |
| 1999 | 697 | +1.31% |
| 2007 | 864 | +2.72% |
| 2012 | 1,037 | +3.72% |
| 2017 | 1,056 | +0.36% |
| 2023 | 1,008 | −0.77% |
Source: INSEE

== See also ==
- Communes of the Hérault department
