= Pouzolles =

- Commune
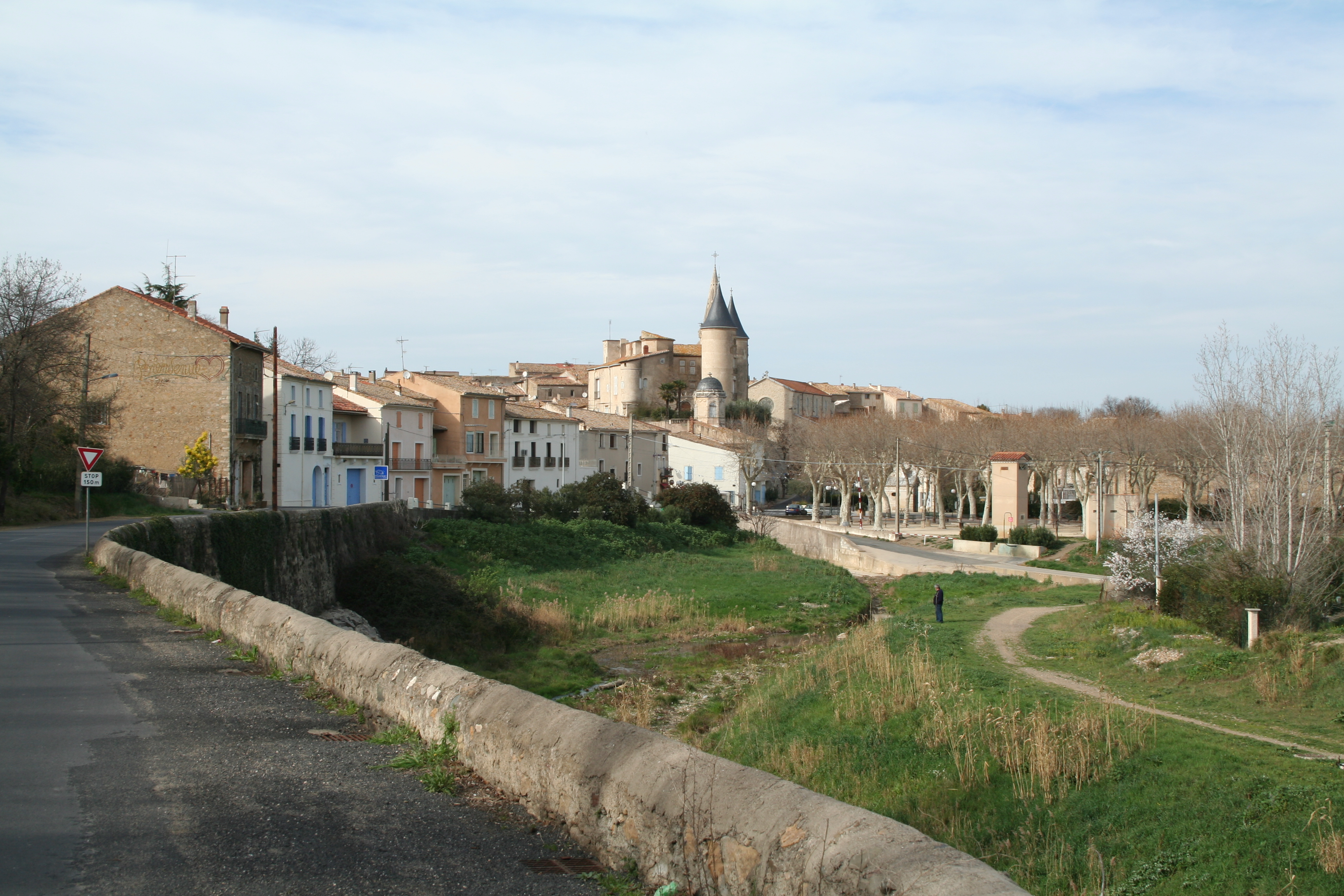
- A general view of Pouzolles

- Coat of arms
- Location of Pouzolles
- Location within France Location within Occitanie
- Coordinates: 43°29′03″N 3°16′47″E
- Country: France
- Region: Occitania
- Department: Hérault
- Arrondissement: Béziers
- Canton: Cazouls-lès-Béziers
- Intercommunality: CC Les Avant-Monts

Government
  - Mayor (2020–2026): Guy Roucayrol
- Area^{1}: 10.01 km^{2} (3.86 sq mi)
- Elevation: 90 m (300 ft)
- Highest elevation: 180 m (590 ft)
- Lowest elevation: 48 m (157 ft)
- Population (2023): 1,233
  - Density: 123.2/km^{2} (319.0/sq mi)
- Demonym: Pouzollais
- Time zone: UTC+01:00 (CET)
  - Summer (DST): UTC+02:00 (CEST)
- INSEE/Postal code: 34214 /34480
- ^{1} French Land Register data, which excludes lakes, ponds, glaciers > 1 km^{2} (0.386 sq mi or 247 acres) and river estuaries.

Pouzolles (French pronunciation: [puzɔl]; Occitan: Posòlas) is a commune in the Hérault department in the Occitanie region in southern France.

== Activities ==
The village has a small collection of a few shops (bakery, superette, tobacconist), a pizzeria and chambres d'hôtes, or gîtes. These come along with various other activities, such as a post office, a nearby paintball, a seasonal gallery and of course the local wines.

== Sights ==
- the château (see on pictures).

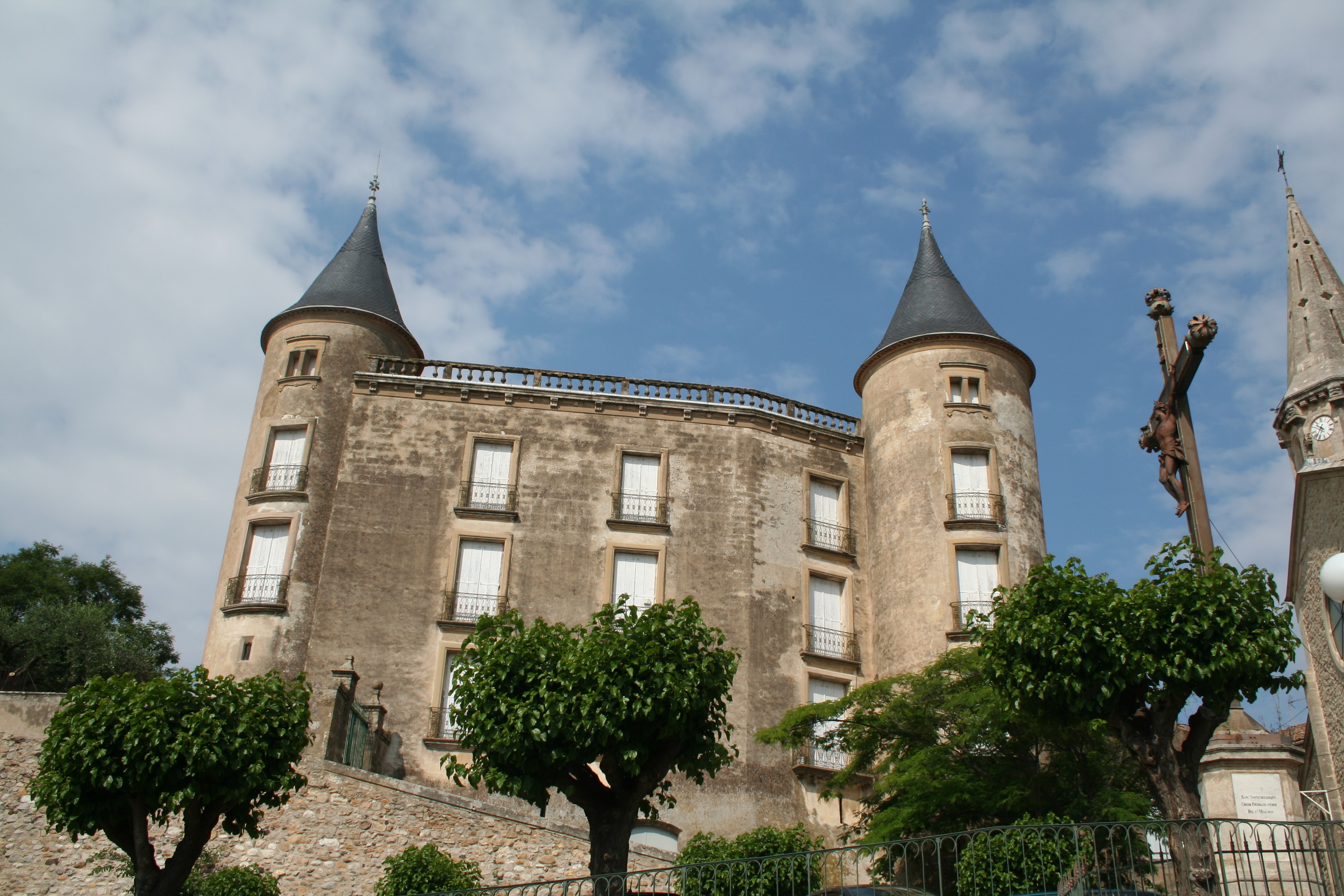
View of the Château

- the village center, built as a circulade.

== Population ==
Historical population
Year	Pop.	±% p.a.
1968	855	—
1975	788	−1.16%
1982	765	−0.42%
1990	762	−0.05%
1999	781	+0.27%
2007	1,018	+3.37%
2012	1,106	+1.67%
2017	1,171	+1.15%
2023	1,233	+0.86%
Source: INSEE

== See also ==
- Communes of the Hérault department
