= Castles in Hérault =

Castles in the Hérault department of France

There are numerous castles in the Hérault department of France. Most are little more than ruins and many are barely discernible. Castles, or their remains, can be found at the following locations (among others):

- Agel: Medieval builders in the 12th century built a castle whose location became the centre of the village. The castle controlled strategic routes. The present château comprises a central fortified tower, four other towers (two with a spiral staircase) and a pigeon loft, and is run as a hotel. It was listed as a monument historique by the French Ministry of Culture in 1979. (43°20′17″N 2°51′12″E)
- Aigues-Vives
- Aumelas: The castle was built from limestone during the late 11th and early 12th centuries and includes a chapel, moat and enceinte. The existence of the Saint-Sauveur chapel is documented from 1114. The castle was dismantled by royal troops in 1622. Since 1989, it has been listed as a monument historique. (43°35′52″N 3°36′32″E)
- Autignac: The village retains vestiges of an ancient castle.
- Bélarga: The Château de Bélarga probably dates from the 14th century. It was remodelled in the 15th century and the north wing from this period survives. During the first half of the 17th century a new castle was built to the north of the first. The original castle is mostly constructed from limestone. It is privately owned.
- Brissac: The site was originally a Roman villa, but the castle dates from the 11th century. The North tower was added in the 12th century, with more additions later. During the 1960s it was bought by a visiting American businessman and his French wife. Being told it was going to be destroyed for a film they took pity and he spent the next nine years rebuilding it as respectfully as possible. It is still privately owned. (43°52′30″N 3°42′7″E)
- Cabrerolles: Village sited on an important route. The presence of a castle confirms the vital importance of this section of the high country. (43°32′50″N 3°7′29″E)
- Cabrières: The castle was mentioned in Gregory of Tours' Historia Francorum ("History of the Franks"). The old village was built at the foot of the castle. The site was never unoccupied until Théodebert, future king of Austrasia left the castle to crown himself, accompanied by Deoteria, Countess of Cabrières. According to legend, before leaving for Lorraine, the future queen took care to pack in her baggage some local vine cuttings. These found the hillsides of Moselle to their liking and produced a wine in which the sun of Cabrières shone. (43°34′8″N 3°20′58″E)

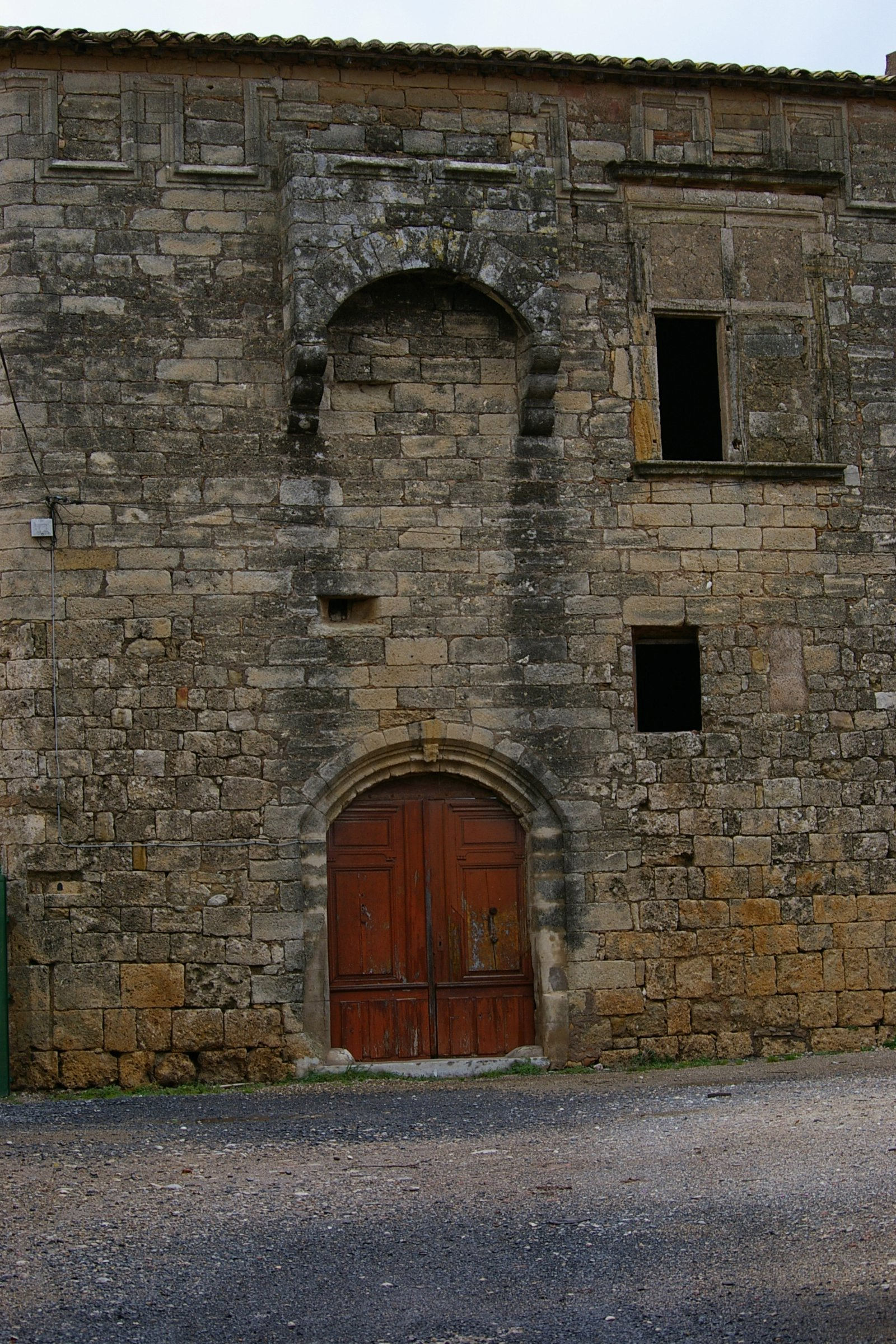
Castelnau de Guers

- Castelnau-de-Guers: This medieval village perched on rocky outcrop near Pézenas, takes its name from the Barons of Guers, who reigned at the Castelnau Castle until the 17th century. The feudal castle was first mentioned in 1069. Today, there remains the crenellated façade, a Romanesque doorway topped by a machicolation, curtain walls, the structure of the drawbridge and the Romanesque chapel. There is a magnificent panorama over the plain from the terrace. The site of the castle was listed as a monument historique in 2003. It is not open to the public. (43°26′7″N 3°26′17″E)
- Cébazan: Château de Saint-Bauléry (43°24′25″N 3°0′16″E)
- Clermont-l'Hérault: Remains of Château des Guilhem. Listed as a monument historique in 1927. (43°37′47″N 3°25′42″E)
- Creissan: Castle built in the 10th century; the remains are in poor condition. (43°22′28″N 3°0′35″E)
- Cruzy: Narrow village streets lead to a feudal castle from the 12th century, formerly the property of the Viscounts of Narbonne.

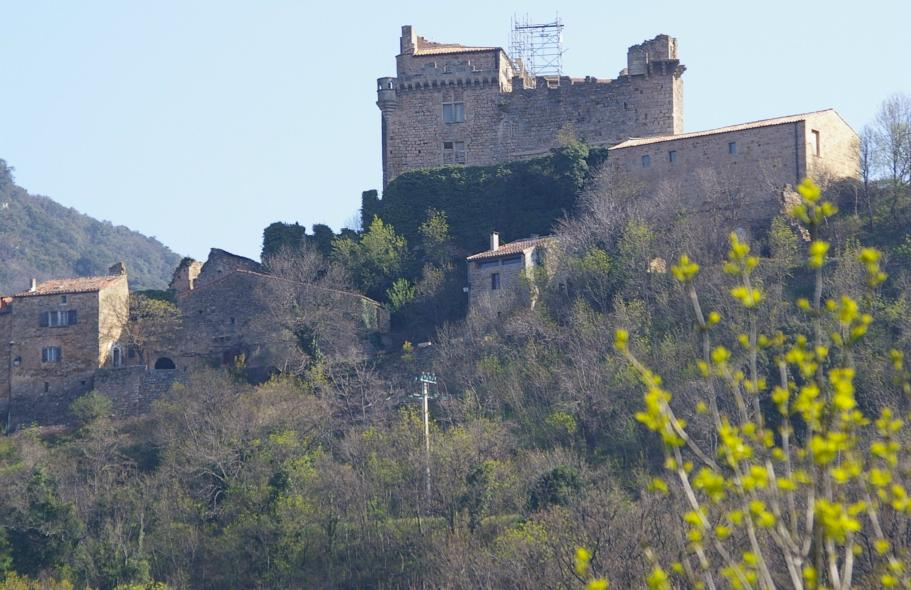
Dio castle

- Dio: Mentioned from 533. The castle was built in the 12th century. A residence was added in the first half of the 17th century, though it is not clear whether this was for Jean de l'Hom, treasurer of France, who owned the castle from 1602, or for Pierre de Fleury who owned it from 1630. The castle is constructed from sandstone. Since 1930, it has been listed as a monument historique by the French Ministry of Culture. (43°40′2″N 3°12′40″E)
- Faugères: Medieval castle, 12th century.
- Fontès: The ruins of the Château de Mazers are approximately 1 km west of Fontès, in woods just off the Neffiès road. They consist of three pieces of wall, up to 20 feet high, and remains of a circular retaining wall on a mound. (43°32′16″N 3°21′54″E)
- Fos: The castle was built under the reign of Francis I. However, it is said that, well before then, Charlemagne fought the Saracens here. (43°33′57″N 3°14′46″E)
- Ganges: Only ruins remain of the Château de Ganges. (43°56′06″N 3°42′33″E)
- Laurens: Originally the site of a Roman villa and home for centurions. In the 12th century, the Knights Templar established the castle as a commandery. Surrounded by its Middle Ages walls, it is known as le petit Carcassonne (little Carcassonne). Modified in the 16th century, it was restored and remodelled in the 19th by Viollet-le-Duc. Listed as a monument historique in 1923, the site is privately owned and run as a hotel and the centre of a vineyard of 1.1 km^{2} (270 acres) producing 4,200,000 litres a year. ( Website) (43°30′15″N 3°11′41″E)
- Malavieille: Ruins in a poor state of preservation located in the commune of Mérifons, 8 miles (13 km) west of Clermont-l'Hérault. Recorded as a "castrum" in 1098, the present castle dates from the 12th and 13th centuries. In 1223, Amalric de Narbonne gave the castle to the bishops of Lodève. It was already abandoned by the 17th century. (43°38′9″N 3°15′58″E)

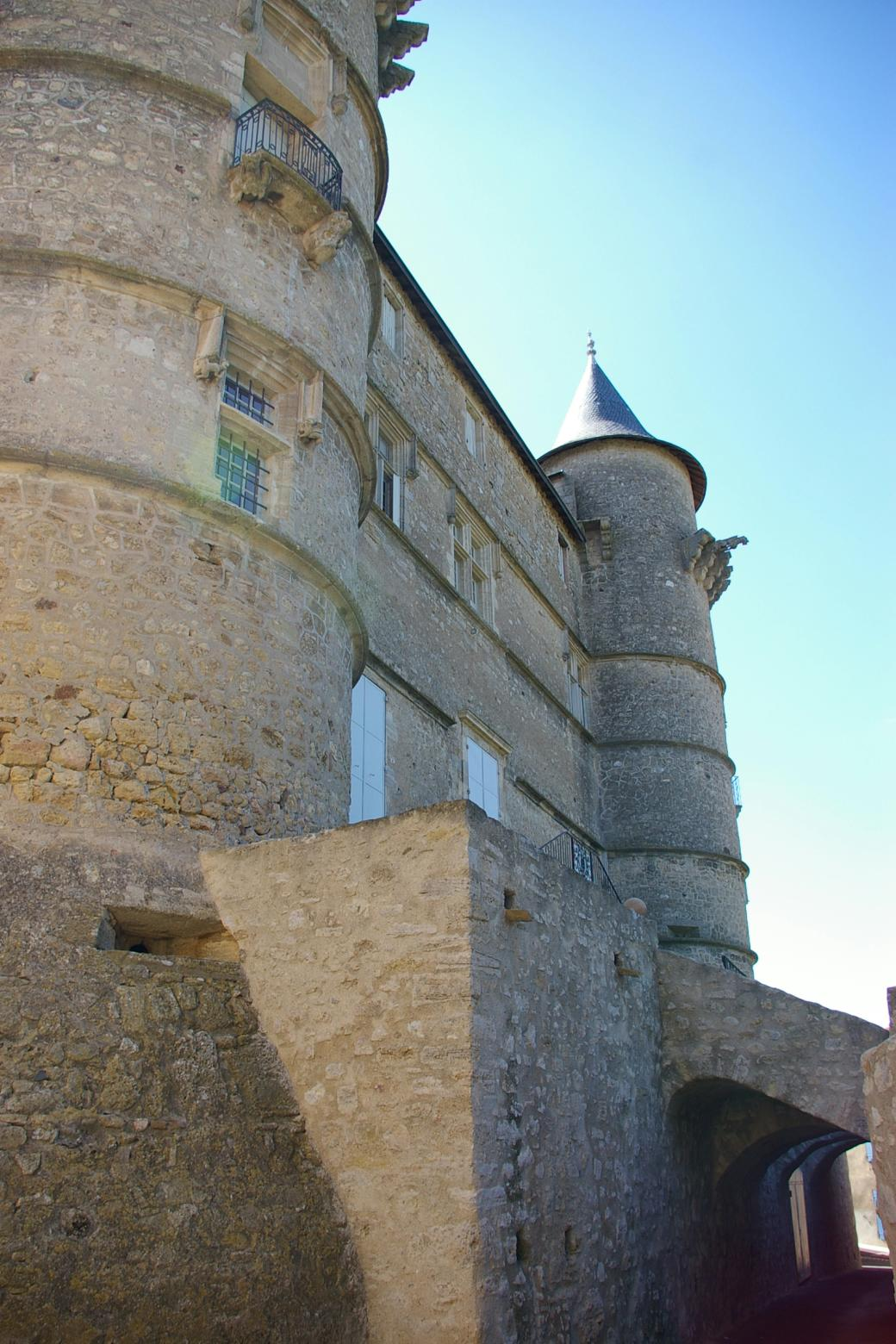
Margon

- Margon: In the centre of Margon, this castle dates from the 15th century with additions and alterations from the 16th, 17th and 18th centuries. It consists of a courtyard with surrounding walls. Staircases lead to an enclosed park and terrasses (open to the public). The castle is inhabited but not, itself, open to visitors. It was listed as a monument historique by the Ministry of Culture in 1937. (43°29′11″N 3°18′22″E)
- Marsillargues: Castle built by Guillaume de Nogaret in 1305, with additions from the 16th and 17th centuries. The castle has been owned by the municipality of Marsillargues since 1948. It was listed as a monument historique by the Ministry of Culture in 1995. (43°39′55″N 4°10′41″E)
- Montouliers
- Mourcairol: Ruined Middle Ages castle and fortifications in the Les Aires commune, a few miles south of Lamalou-les-Bains. The hilltop location provides extensive views of the region. The only complete part of the castle is the St Michel chapel. Restoration work is being carried out. (43°32′5″N 3°19′52″E)
- Neffiès: The town is built in circular form around the castle.
- Pailhès
- Pégairolles-de-l'Escalette: 12th-century castle, altered in the 17th century. Closed to the public. It was listed as a monument historique by the Ministry of Culture in 1984.
- Pézenas: Destroyed 1632. See Château de Pézenas
- Pézènes-les-Mines: The Château de Pézènes is a feudal castle on the edge of the village, dominating the site from a rocky ridge. It was listed as a monument historique in 1981. (43°35′20″N 3°15′8″E)
- Puissalicon: Restored castle from the fourth quarter of the 13th century. Listed as a monument historique in 1947 and protected since 1988.
- Puisserguier: Remains of castle and walls from the 12th century.
- Roquessels: The Château de Roquessels is now ruined, though the chapel remains. (43°33′9″N 3°13′24″E)
- Thézan-lès-Béziers: Like many other villages in the region, Thézan is built around a hilltop surmounted with a medieval castle (the Château d'Aspiran de Ravanès) having a 14th-century façade, a large round tower from the 17th century and a gate bearing the date 1674.
- Valros: Small castle/fort. See Fort de Valros.
- Vendres: The remains of the 13th century Château de Vendres consist of a gatehouse and curtain wall, and remnants of the ramparts. It has been listed since 1926 as a monument historique.

== See also ==
- List of castles in France

== Sources ==
- Faugères & Saint-Chinian en Terres d'Orb (booklet) (2004) Edition 2004
- Discovering the Historic and Remarkable sites of the Pays d'Agde Region (leaflet) Communauté de Communes des Pays d'Agde (undated)
- Green Guide: Languedoc, Roussillon, Tarn Gorges (1998) Michelin ISBN 2-06-136602-3
