= Château de Bélarga =

Château in Occitania, France

Coordinates: 43°33′9.09″N 3°29′7.21″E

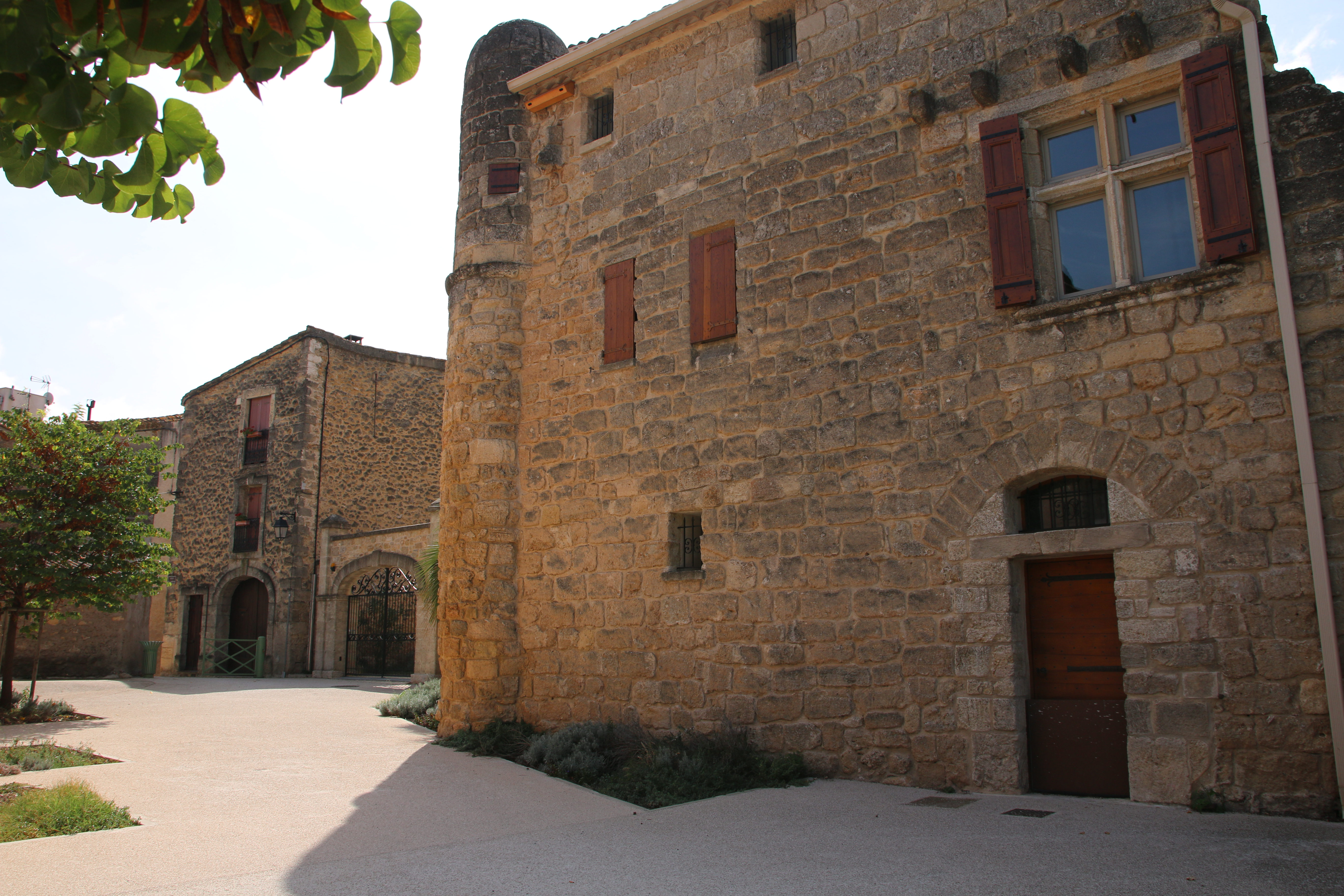
The Château de Bélarga

The Château de Bélarga is a château constructed in the 17th century located on the left bank of the Hérault River in the commune of Bélarga in the Hérault département of France. Part of the building is from an earlier castle dating from the 14th and 15th centuries.

== History ==
A castle was recorded in Bélarga before 1281, in a document concerning the construction of a village. An enceinte commanded by this fortress was built at the end of the 13th century or the beginning of the 14th century. The building dominated a ford over the Hérault which was subject to a toll.

The area belonged to the Guilhem family, powerful lords of Clermont-Lodève (today Clermont-l'Hérault). Berenger IV of Guilhem was described as lord of the castrum de Belesgario in 1310. His successor, Pierre de Clermont, is infamous for having committed in Bélarga a crime against the person of a young woman from Puilacher, for which he was condemned in 1310 by the sénéchal of Carcassonne; the sentence was confirmed by the Parlement of Paris on 29 January 1311 (see below). One result was the confiscation of the seigneurie of Bélarga.

In the 17th century, the castle belonged to the Mirmans, a family of the Nobles of the Robe which included numerous magistrates in the sovereign courts of Languedoc. In 1654, the knight François de Mirman, conseiller du roi and intendant des gabelles, had the titles of "baron de Florac, seigneur de Bélarga, etc.".

The Mirmans gave the building its current appearance, embellishing it "in the rustic taste fashionable in the 17th century in Montpellier".

== Description ==
The north wing of the present building probably dates from the 14th century, altered in the 15th. North of this, a new château was built in the 17th century.

== Ownership ==
The Château de Bélarga is private property, inhabited by its owners. It was the object of a study for the cultural heritage inventory by the French Ministry of Culture in 1976.

== Pierre de Clermont's crime ==
On 29 January 1311, the Parlement of Paris confirmed a sentence passed by the sénéchal of Carcassonne on Pierre de Clermont, seigneur de Bélarga, in these terms:

| Pierre avait attiré dans sa maison de Bélarga (de Belesgario), Fize, demoiselle de Pui Laché (de Podio Latercio), et avait cherché à la connaître charnellement. Sur le refus de la demoiselle, il lui avait lié les mains, et l'avait fait conduire au château et mettre dans une affreuse prison. Après l'y avoir tenue trois jours, il l'en avait tirée, et ayant renvoyé tous ses domestiques, il avait fermé la porte et recommencé ses obsessions, lui promettant, si elle consentait à satisfaire ses désirs, de lui donner du blé, des habits et un mari. Ne pouvant rien obtenir, il la posa sur une poutre par le milieu du corps, de sorte que la tête et les pieds pendaient ; il lui suspendit aux jambes et aux bras des cabas chargés de pierres, et la laissa dans cette position. Le sang sortit par les narines de cette malheureuse, qui ne fut délivrée qu'à condition d'avouer, ce qui était faux, qu'elle avait eu un enfant. Pierre paiera cinq cents livres d'amende au Roi et cent livres à la demoiselle. | Pierre had attracted to his house in Bélarga (de Belesgario), Fize, young lady of Pui Laché (de Podio Latercio), and had sought to know her carnally. On the refusal of the young lady, he had bound her hands, and lead her to the castle and put her in a dreadful prison. After having held her there for three days, he brought her out, and having sent away all of his servants, he had closed the door and had started again his obsessions, promising her, if she agreed to satisfy his desires, to give her wheat, clothes and a husband. Not being able to obtain anything, he put her over a beam by the middle of her body, such that her head and feet hung; he suspended from her legs and her arms baskets loaded with stones, and left her in this position. Blood flowed from the nostrils of this wretch, who was released only on condition that she admitted, which was false, that she had had a child. Pierre will pay five hundred livres in fines to the King and one hundred livres to the young lady. |

== See also ==
- Château des Guilhem
- List of castles in France
- Castles in Hérault
