= Faugères AOC =

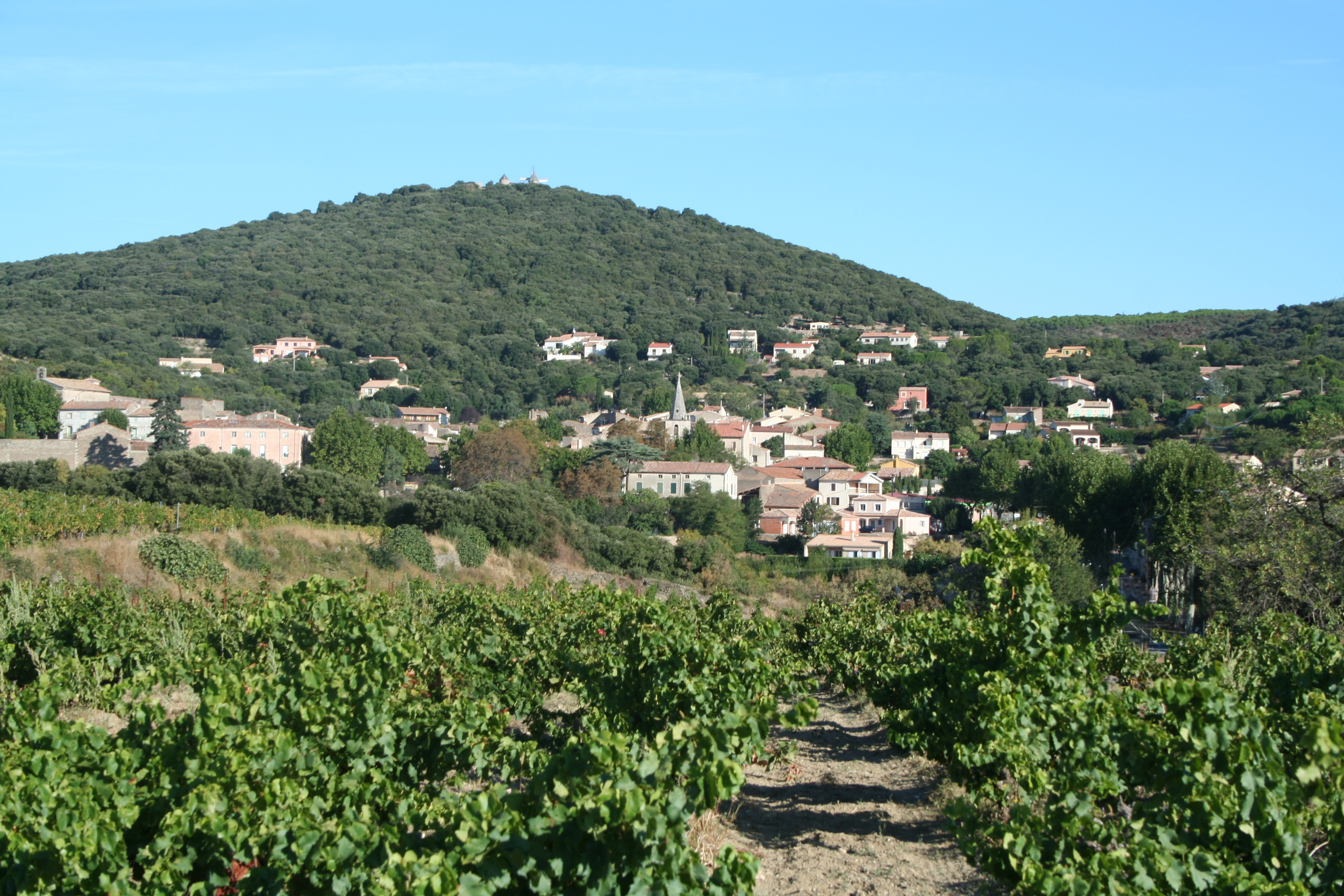

Faugères (French pronunciation: [foʒɛʁ]; also known as Coteaux-du-Languedoc Faugères) is an Appellation d'origine contrôlée (AOC) in the Languedoc-Roussillon wine region in France and is named after the town of Faugères, which lies 30 km north of Béziers, in the foothills of the Massif Central, in the département of Hérault. It is a local classification within the Coteaux-du-Languedoc AOC.

== History ==
=== The Middle Ages ===
Faugères is not the oldest winemaking area in Languedoc. In the Middle Ages, its land was mainly used for growing grain, and olives. However, there was some viticulture, most notably the production of altar wine.

=== The Modern Period ===
Faugères started to flourish as a wine-producing area around the time of the French Revolution, i.e. around the start of the 19th century. Local wine was in fact mainly used to produce a type of eau de vie, using a distilling method from the Charente region, that was previously unknown in the Languedoc. This method was called 'fine', so this eau de vie was named 'Fine Faugères'.

=== Recent history ===
- 1948: The Faugères terroir's borders were defined, in the aftermath of the Second World War, and remain unchanged to this day.
- 1955: each type of Faugères wine (red, white and rosé) was classified as Appellation d'Origine Vin de Qualité Supérieure (VDQS).
- 1960s: Violent storms destroyed part of the Faugères vineyards, torrential rain gullying the vines. Some plots of land were buried in landslides. Vines were replanted along the contour lines of the newly formed land.
- 1982: Appellation d'Origine Protégée (AOP Faugères) classification replaced the VDQS status for the red and rosé Faugères wines.
- 2000: Eau de vie production was recommenced in Faugères.
- 2005: AOC replaced VDQS status for the white Faugères wines.
- 2017: Appellation d'Origine Protégée replaces the former AOC (Appellation d'Origine Contrôlée) label, within the framework of new 'quality' ladder (following a national reform of the wine quality labels in France).

== Etymology ==
The name of the AOC comes from the village Faugères, whose earliest known written form, dating back to 934 AD, was de Falgarias. This in turn is taken from the Latin filicaria, meaning "fern" in English, and translating into French as "fougère".

== Geography ==
=== Orography ===
The appellation area covers 1800 hectares, and consists mainly of primary, schist soils. The majority of the region's vineyards have full southern exposure and lie on rugged slopes. Some hills in the northern area of the appellation area reach altitudes higher than 500m. The Departmental Director of Agriculture, in collaboration with 'SAFER' (French regional societies for the development of land and rural establishments), have experimented setting up vineyards along contour lines, which serves to limit the effects of erosion.

=== Geology ===
The Faugères AOC soil is mainly composed of schist. This schist is metamorphic rock, the result of excessive pressure on clay deposits during the Paleozoic Era and of the formation of the Massif Central to the North. Schist is characterised by its capacity to retain large amounts of water (up to a third of its volume) and its heat-storing properties, absorbing heat during the day and releasing it at night. Faugères winemakers often say that their grapes ripen overnight. A geological curiosity exists in the Cabrerolles commune - a meteor crater resulting from the impact of a twenty metre-wide bolite meteorite circa 10,000 years ago. The crater has Syrah vines planted in it (two stages of planting in 1984, then in 1992) which produces a wine from the 'Domaine du Météore'.

=== Climate ===
This terroir enjoys a Mediterranean climate with mountainous influences, characterised by gentle winters, hot, dry summers, and a low amount of rainfall that comes mainly in the winter months. Its main winds are the Tramontane, a dry and cold wind that blows clouds away, and the Marin, a humid wind that, contrarily, brings clouds in. The climate can sometimes be very harsh. The table below records temperatures and rainfall for 2007:

Month	J	F	M	A	M	J	J	A	S	O	N	D	Year
Maximum Average Temperature (°C)	6	7	11	13	17	22	25	25	20	15	9	7	14,75
Minimum Average Temperature (°C)	1	1	3	4	8	12	14	14	11	8	4	2	6,8
Average Temperatures (°C)	3,5	4	7	8,5	12,5	17	18,5	18,5	15,5	11,5	6,5	4,5	9,8
Rainfall (avg. in mm)	36,2	27,0	23,9	43,8	46,0	34,9	22,9	31,1	50,0	60,1	45,1	37,7	461,7
Source: MSN Weather

== Wine region ==
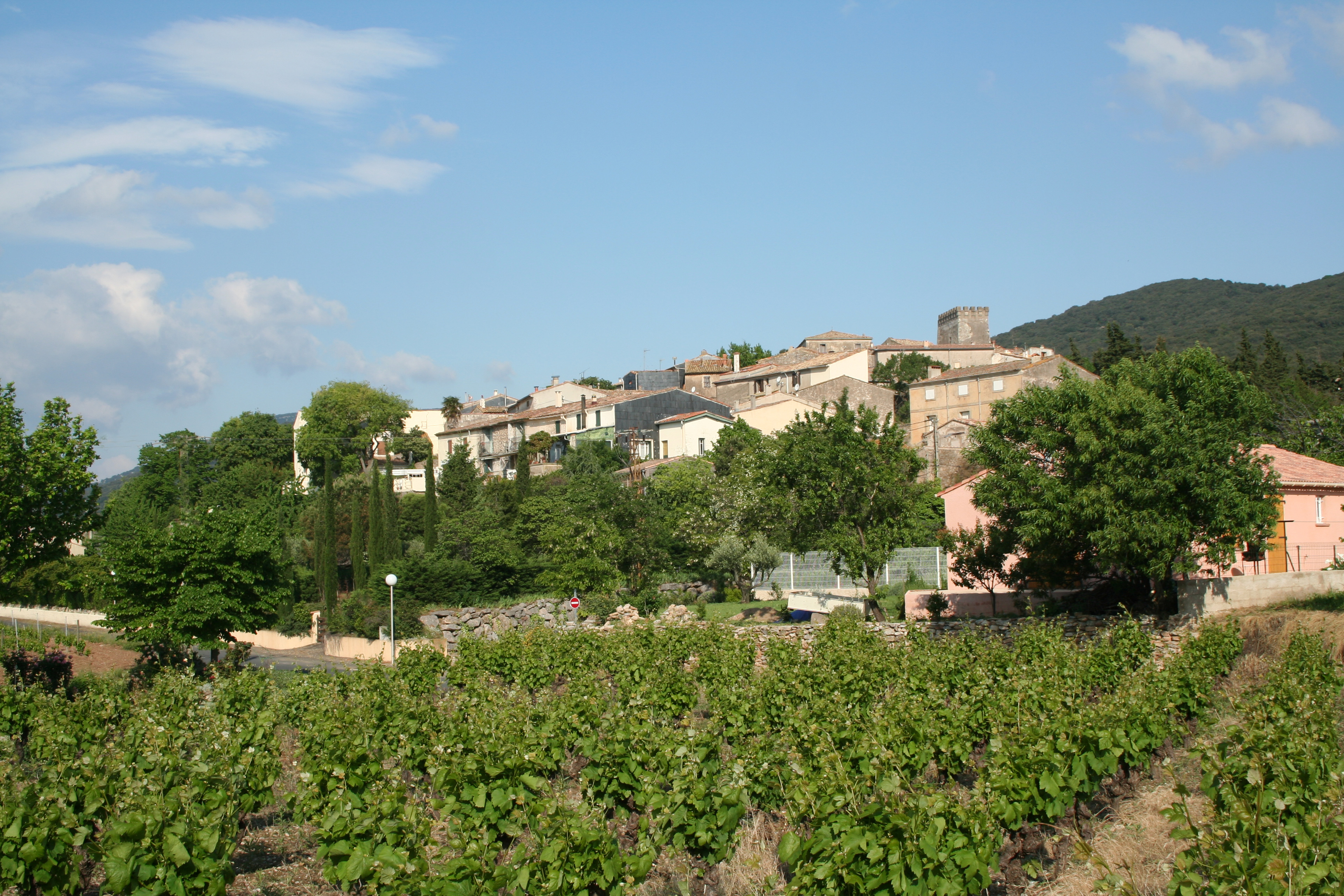
Caussiniojouls vines

=== Overview ===
The Faugères appellation stretches across the following communes: Autignac, Cabrerolles (Includes the hamlets of Lentheric, Liquière and Aigues-Vives), Caussiniojouls, Faugères, Fos, Laurens and Roquessels

=== Grape varieties ===
The main grape varieties in Faugères are Carignan, Cinsault, Grenache, Mourvèdre and Syrah for red and rosé wines. Rousanne, white Grenache, Marsanne and Vermentino for white wines. 80% of grape production is used to make red wine.

=== Cultivation methods ===
Vines are planted against the slope to gain maximum sunlight from southern exposure. After violent storms in the 1960s, Faugères winemakers replanted a lot of vines along the terrain's contour lines. The vines are now adapted to the natural slope of the schist hillsides. Because of this, the erosive effects of heavy autumnal rain are much smaller than in other vineyards in the Languedoc. Similar projects are being considered by the Saint-Chinian AOC and Coteaux du Languedoc areas.

=== Business structure ===
There are two cooperative wineries and 44 winemakers in independent wineries (as of 2010).

=== Wine types ===
Faugères wines are rounded, with matured fruits and soft tannins.

== See also ==
- Languedoc wine
- List of vins de primeur
