= Pézènes-les-Mines =

- Commune
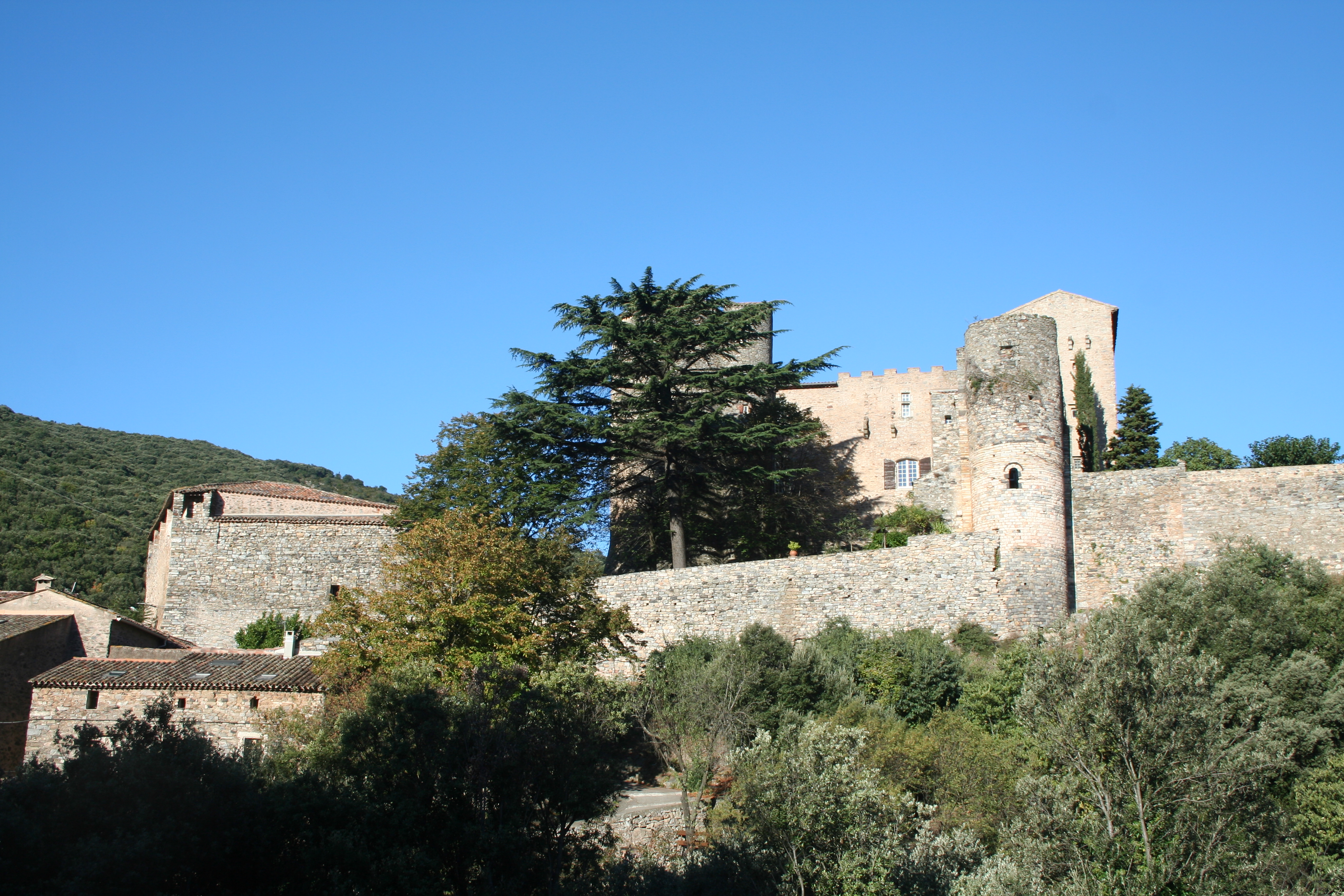
- Chateau

- Coat of arms
- Location of Pézènes-les-Mines
- Location within France Location within Occitanie
- Coordinates: 43°35′24″N 3°15′09″E
- Country: France
- Region: Occitania
- Department: Hérault
- Arrondissement: Béziers
- Canton: Clermont-l'Hérault

Government
  - Mayor (2020–2026): Alain Bozon
- Area^{1}: 26.87 km^{2} (10.37 sq mi)
- Highest elevation: 501 m (1,644 ft)
- Lowest elevation: 194 m (636 ft)
- Population (2023): 237
  - Density: 8.82/km^{2} (22.8/sq mi)
- Time zone: UTC+01:00 (CET)
  - Summer (DST): UTC+02:00 (CEST)
- INSEE/Postal code: 34200 /34600
- ^{1} French Land Register data, which excludes lakes, ponds, glaciers > 1 km^{2} (0.386 sq mi or 247 acres) and river estuaries.

Pézènes-les-Mines (French pronunciation: [pezɛn le min]; Languedocien: Pesena de las Minas) is a commune in the Hérault department in the Occitanie region in southern France. Until 1926, the commune was known simply as Pézènes; the name change was authorised by government decree.

On the edge of the village is the Château de Pézènes, a feudal castle, dominating the site from a rocky ridge. It has been listed since 1981 as a monument historique by the French Ministry of Culture.

== Heraldry ==
Pézènes-les-Mines	Sable, a pall lozengy argent and azure. Supporters: 2 greyhounds, Marquis's coronet, a Moor's bust as crest.

== Population ==
Historical population
Year	Pop.	±% p.a.
1968	151	—
1975	150	−0.09%
1982	180	+2.64%
1990	207	+1.76%
1999	172	−2.04%
2007	198	+1.78%
2012	248	+4.61%
2017	241	−0.57%
2023	237	−0.28%
Source: INSEE

== See also ==
- Castles in Hérault
- Communes of the Hérault department
