= Villeneuvette =

- Commune
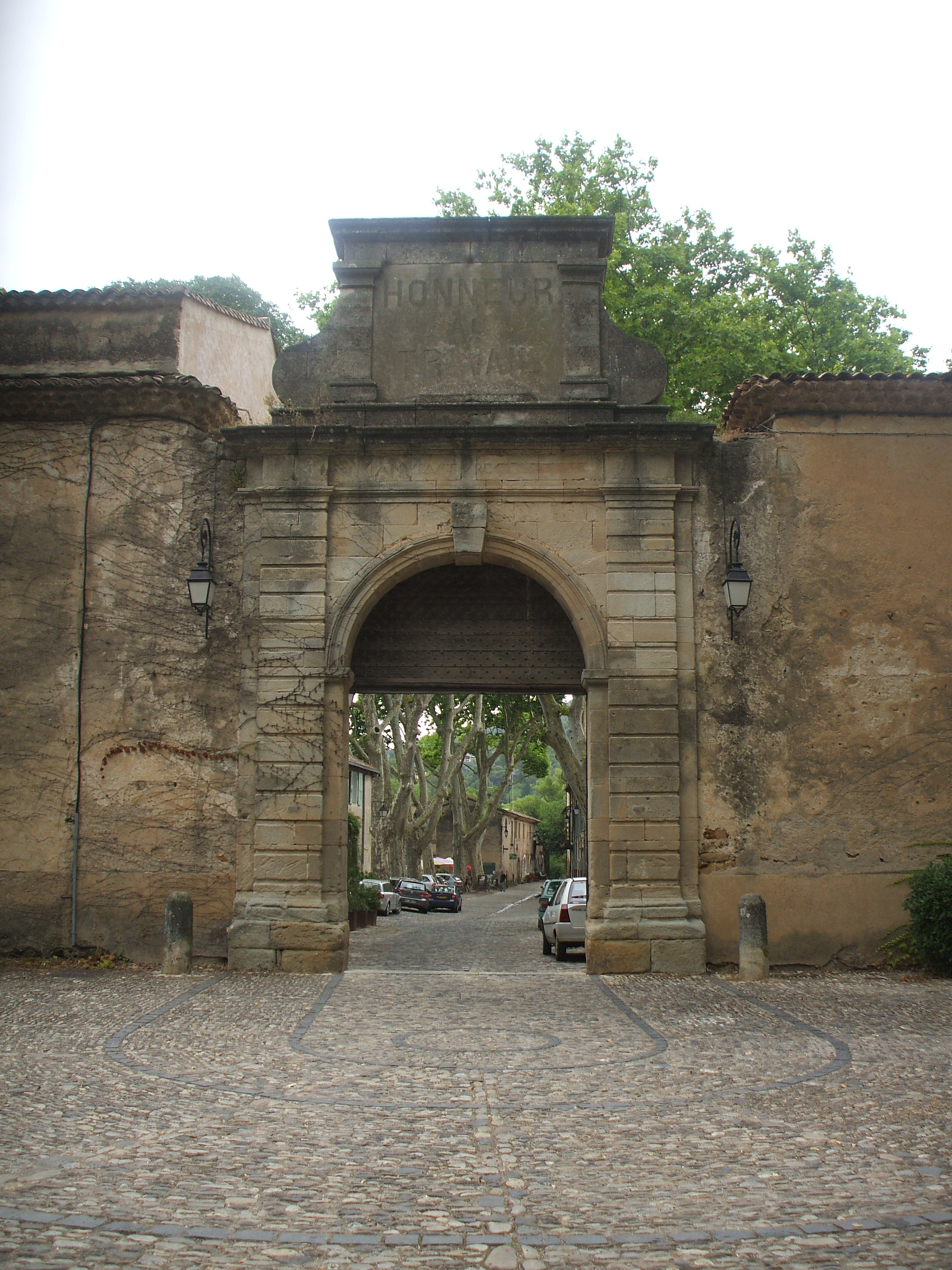
- Village gate
- Location of Villeneuvette
- Location within France Location within Occitanie
- Coordinates: 43°36′40″N 3°24′01″E
- Country: France
- Region: Occitania
- Department: Hérault
- Arrondissement: Lodève
- Canton: Clermont-l'Hérault

Government
  - Mayor (2022–2026): Laurent Albert
- Area^{1}: 3.14 km^{2} (1.21 sq mi)
- Elevation: 140 m (460 ft)
- Highest elevation: 317 m (1,040 ft)
- Lowest elevation: 116 m (381 ft)
- Population (2023): 65
  - Density: 21/km^{2} (54/sq mi)
- Time zone: UTC+01:00 (CET)
  - Summer (DST): UTC+02:00 (CEST)
- INSEE/Postal code: 34338 /34800
- ^{1} French Land Register data, which excludes lakes, ponds, glaciers > 1 km^{2} (0.386 sq mi or 247 acres) and river estuaries.

Villeneuvette (French pronunciation: [vilnœvɛt]; Occitan: La Fatura) is a commune in the Hérault department in the Occitanie region in southern France. It is close to the town of Clermont l'Hérault.

Villeneuvette is a small village made up of a group of buildings built in the 17th century to create a royal clothmaking factory and to provide accommodation for its workers. Apart from a hotel and restaurant, the buildings are now restricted to residential use, many for holiday purposes.

The creation of Villeneuvette was promoted in 1677 by Jean-Baptiste Colbert, the noted finance minister of King Louis XIV. It was one of his many initiatives to develop France's industrial base. The factory was powered hydraulically, the water being drawn from various water courses from existing basins. The factory was privately owned and produced cloth for the king, including uniforms for his armies. The factory was operational until 1955.

Since 1995, the village has been classified as a "Zone de Protection du Patrimoine et du Paysage", recognising the originality and importance of its heritage.

Since 2014, the site has been listed as monument historique by the French Ministry of Culture.

The original inscription above the gateway was "MANUFACTURE ROYALE" but this was later rather crudely changed by the Republic to "HONNEUR AU TRAVAIL" - Honour in work.

== Population ==
Historical population
Year	Pop.	±% p.a.
1968	61	—
1975	50	−2.80%
1982	75	+5.96%
1990	83	+1.27%
1999	85	+0.26%
2007	67	−2.93%
2012	68	+0.30%
2017	71	+0.87%
2023	65	−1.46%
Source: INSEE

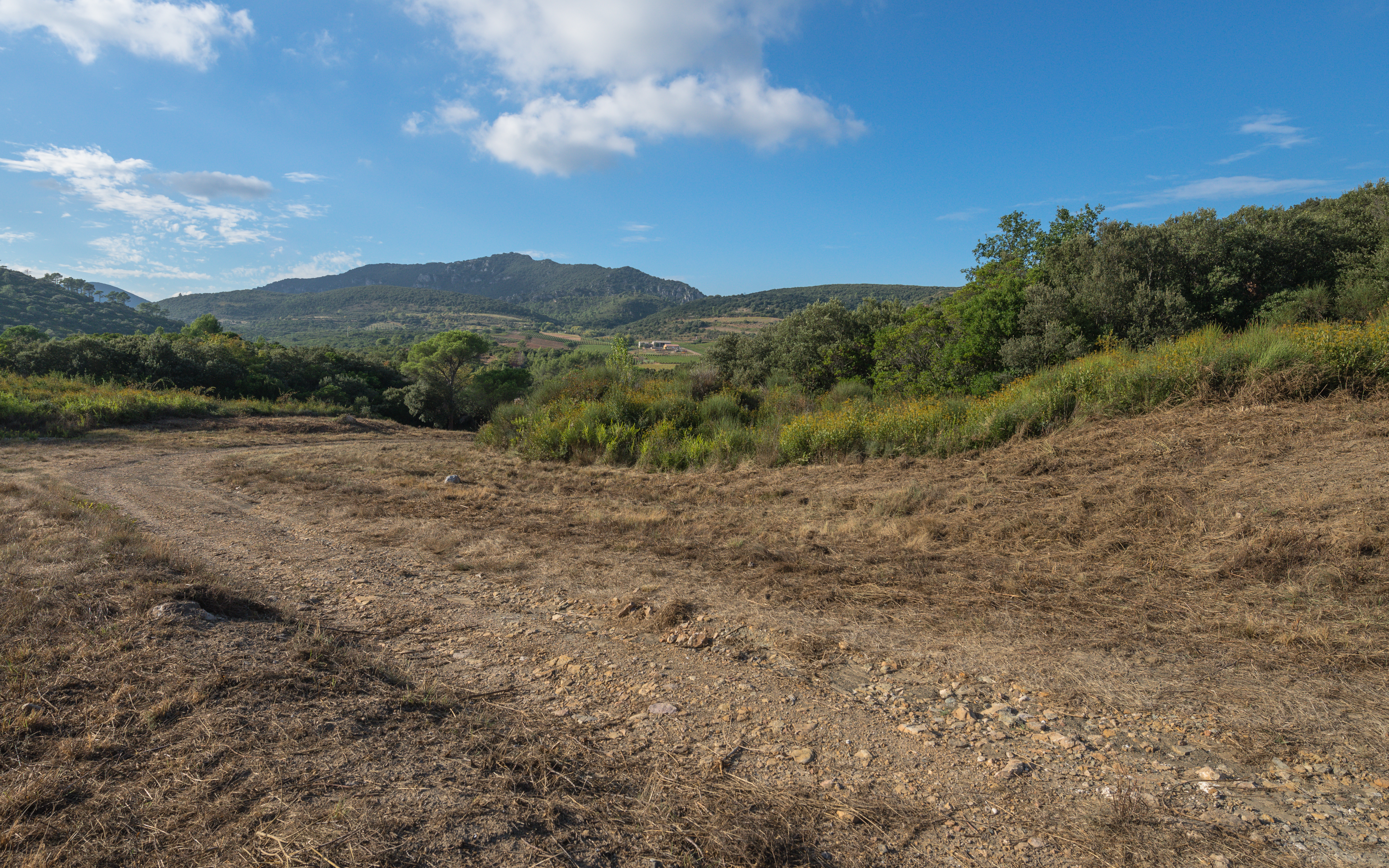
"Montagne de Liausson" from Villeneuvette

== See also ==
- Communes of the Hérault department
