= Fos, Hérault =

Fos
- Commune
- Coat of arms
- Location of Fos
- Location within France Location within Occitanie
- Coordinates: 43°34′01″N 3°14′47″E
- Country: France
- Region: Occitania
- Department: Hérault
- Arrondissement: Béziers
- Canton: Cazouls-lès-Béziers
- Intercommunality: CC Les Avant-Monts

Government
  - Mayor (2020–2026): Francis Vabre
- Area^{1}: 6.58 km^{2} (2.54 sq mi)
- Elevation: 30 m (98 ft)
- Highest elevation: 464 m (1,522 ft)
- Lowest elevation: 171 m (561 ft)
- Population (2023): 133
  - Density: 20.2/km^{2} (52.4/sq mi)
- Time zone: UTC+01:00 (CET)
  - Summer (DST): UTC+02:00 (CEST)
- INSEE/Postal code: 34104 /34320
- ^{1} French Land Register data, which excludes lakes, ponds, glaciers > 1 km^{2} (0.386 sq mi or 247 acres) and river estuaries.

Fos (French pronunciation: [fɔs]; Languedocien: Fòs) is a commune in the Hérault department in southern France.

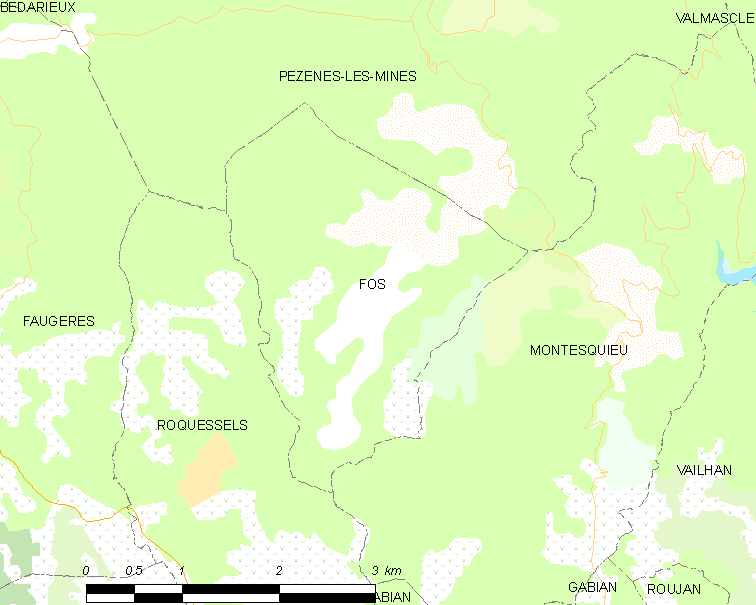
Map

== Winemaking ==
Fos is one of the seven communes which produces Faugères AOC wine.

== Population ==
Historical population
Year	Pop.	±% p.a.
1968	92	—
1975	69	−4.03%
1982	66	−0.63%
1990	80	+2.43%
1999	96	+2.05%
2007	95	−0.13%
2012	116	+4.08%
2017	107	−1.60%
2023	133	+3.69%
Source: INSEE

== See also ==
- Communes of the Hérault department
