= Château de Vendres =

Ruined castle in Occitania, France

The Château de Vendres is a ruined castle in the commune of Vendres in the Hérault département of France.

The castle dates from the 13th century. The remains consist of a gatehouse and curtain wall, and remnants of the ramparts. It is thought that stones used in its construction were salvaged from ancient Roman structures, including the Temple of Venus.

The castle is privately owned. It has been listed since 1926 as a monument historique by the French Ministry of Culture.

== See also ==
- List of castles in France
