= Laurens, Hérault =

Laurens
- Commune
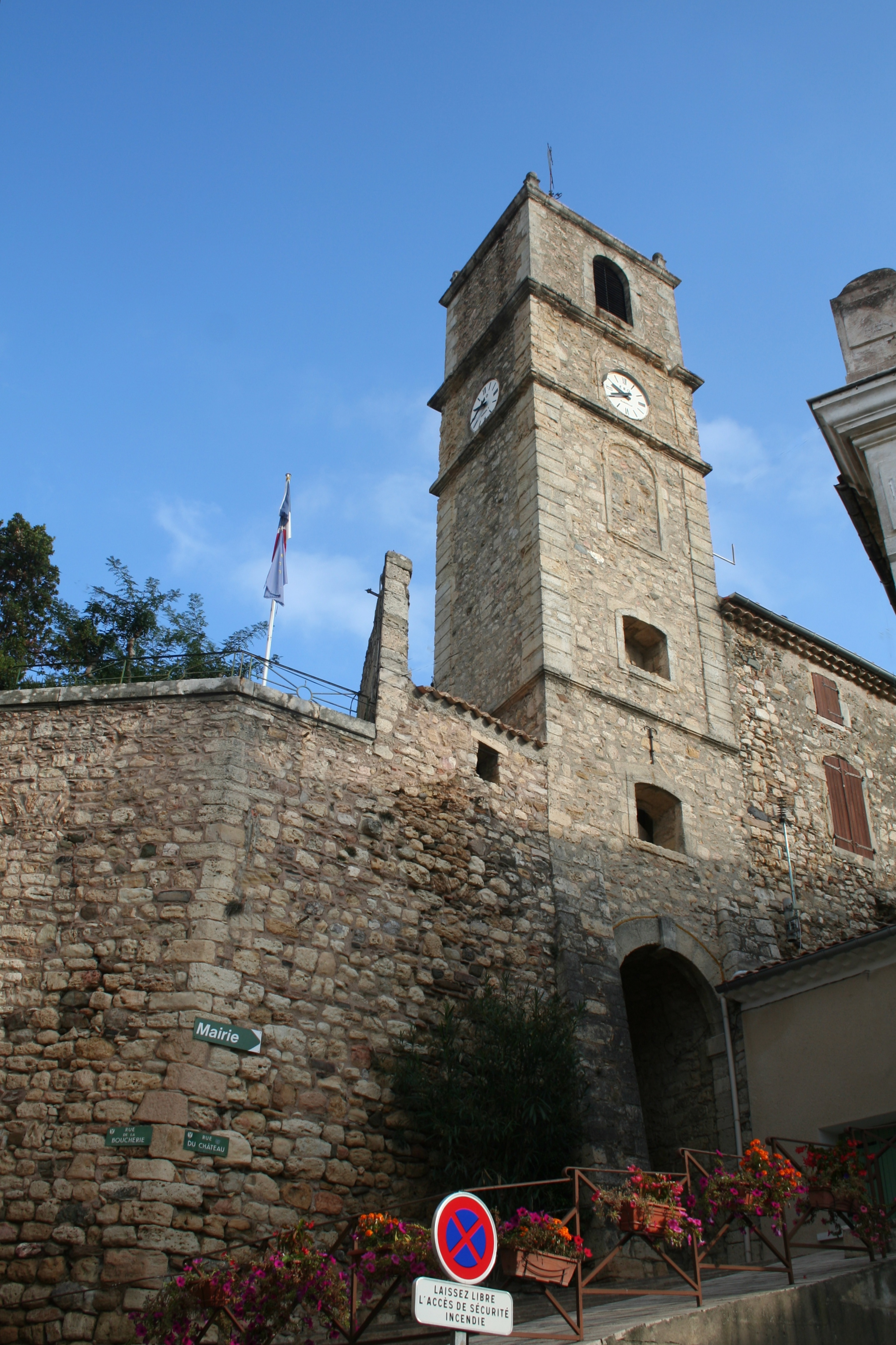
- The Rue du château at Laurens

- Coat of arms
- Location of Laurens
- Location within France Location within Occitanie
- Coordinates: 43°31′27″N 3°11′52″E
- Country: France
- Region: Occitania
- Department: Hérault
- Arrondissement: Béziers
- Canton: Cazouls-lès-Béziers
- Intercommunality: CC Les Avant-Monts

Government
  - Mayor (2020–2026): François Anglade
- Area^{1}: 16.39 km^{2} (6.33 sq mi)
- Elevation: 140 m (460 ft)
- Highest elevation: 228 m (748 ft)
- Lowest elevation: 117 m (384 ft)
- Population (2023): 1,815
  - Density: 110.7/km^{2} (286.8/sq mi)
- Time zone: UTC+01:00 (CET)
  - Summer (DST): UTC+02:00 (CEST)
- INSEE/Postal code: 34130 /34480
- ^{1} French Land Register data, which excludes lakes, ponds, glaciers > 1 km^{2} (0.386 sq mi or 247 acres) and river estuaries.

Laurens (French pronunciation: [lɔʁɛ̃s]; Languedocien: Laurenç) is a commune in the Hérault département in the Occitanie region in southern France.

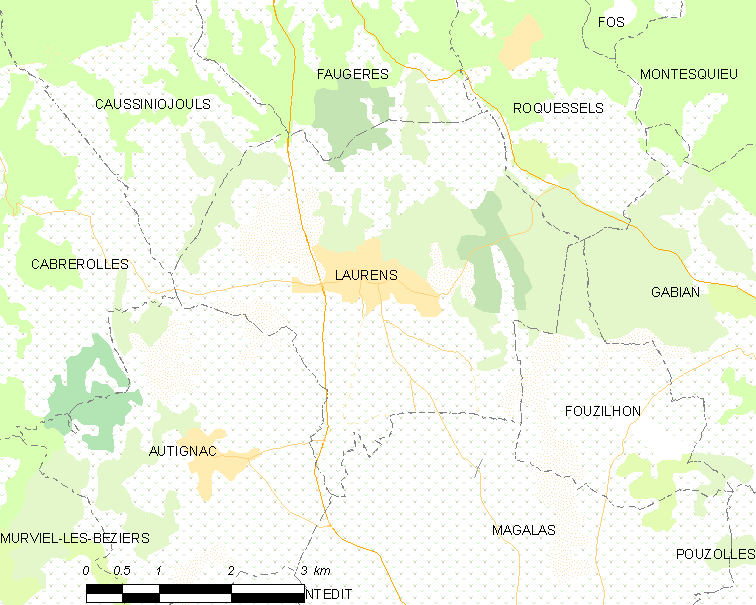
Map

== Winemaking ==
Laurens is one of the seven communes which produces Faugères AOC wine.

== Population ==
Historical population
Year	Pop.	±% p.a.
1968	1,047	—
1975	1,028	−0.26%
1982	1,006	−0.31%
1990	1,009	+0.04%
1999	932	−0.88%
2007	1,263	+3.87%
2012	1,514	+3.69%
2017	1,702	+2.37%
2023	1,815	+1.08%
Source: INSEE

== See also ==
- Communes of the Hérault department
