= Château de Roquessels =

Ruined castle in Hérault, France

Coordinates: 43°33′9″N 3°13′24″E

The Château de Roquessels is a ruined castle in the commune of Roquessels in the Hérault département of France.

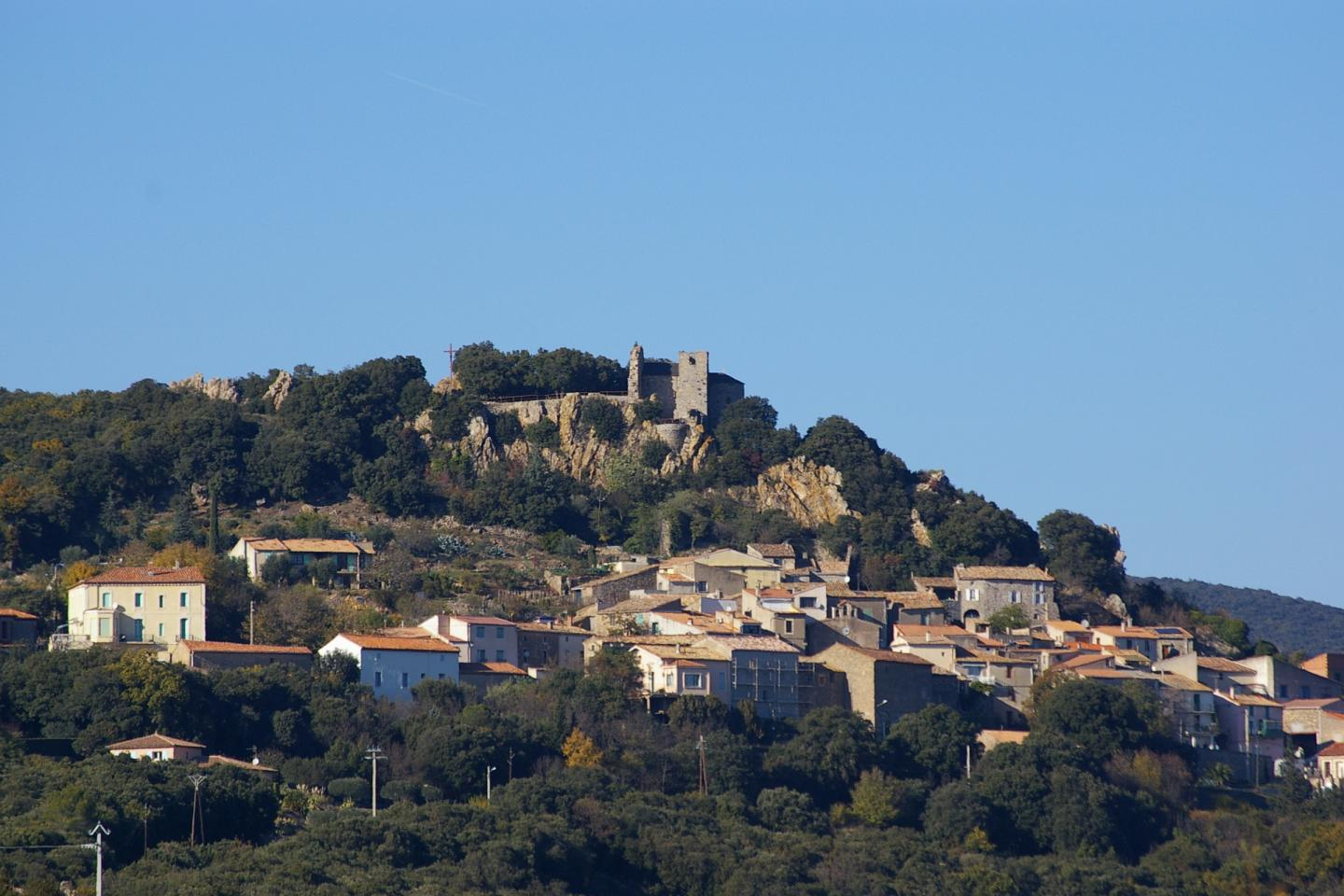
Roquessels

The Château de Roquessels was built in the 10th century. It was a dependency of the convent of Cassans, which collected tithes from the baron of Margon. In 1247, the inhabitants of the village, like all subjects of the Trencavels, viscount of Béziers, were released from their pledge of allegiance and submitted to the King of France. The castle resisted valiantly the assaults of Simon de Montfort's army. Today, the only remains are a chapel with fine windows and massive walls on three sides.

It is likely that the castle was one of a number that fell to the Huguenots during the French Wars of Religion in 1569, an assumption attested to by its church being spared while the manor was completely destroyed by fire from artillery, which according to tradition, occupied the heights of Mortesout. It was retaken a few years later by Montmorency-Damville.

The castle was abandoned for more comfortable dwellings in the 18th century, in line with the changing tastes of the aristocracy of the period. The keep was destroyed during the French Revolution and its stones used to build the new mairie (town hall).

The chapel (Eglise Notre-Dame) has been listed since 1991 as a monument historique by the French Ministry of Culture.

== See also ==
- List of castles in France
