= Château de Pézènes =

French castle

Coordinates: 43.5891°N 3.2522°E

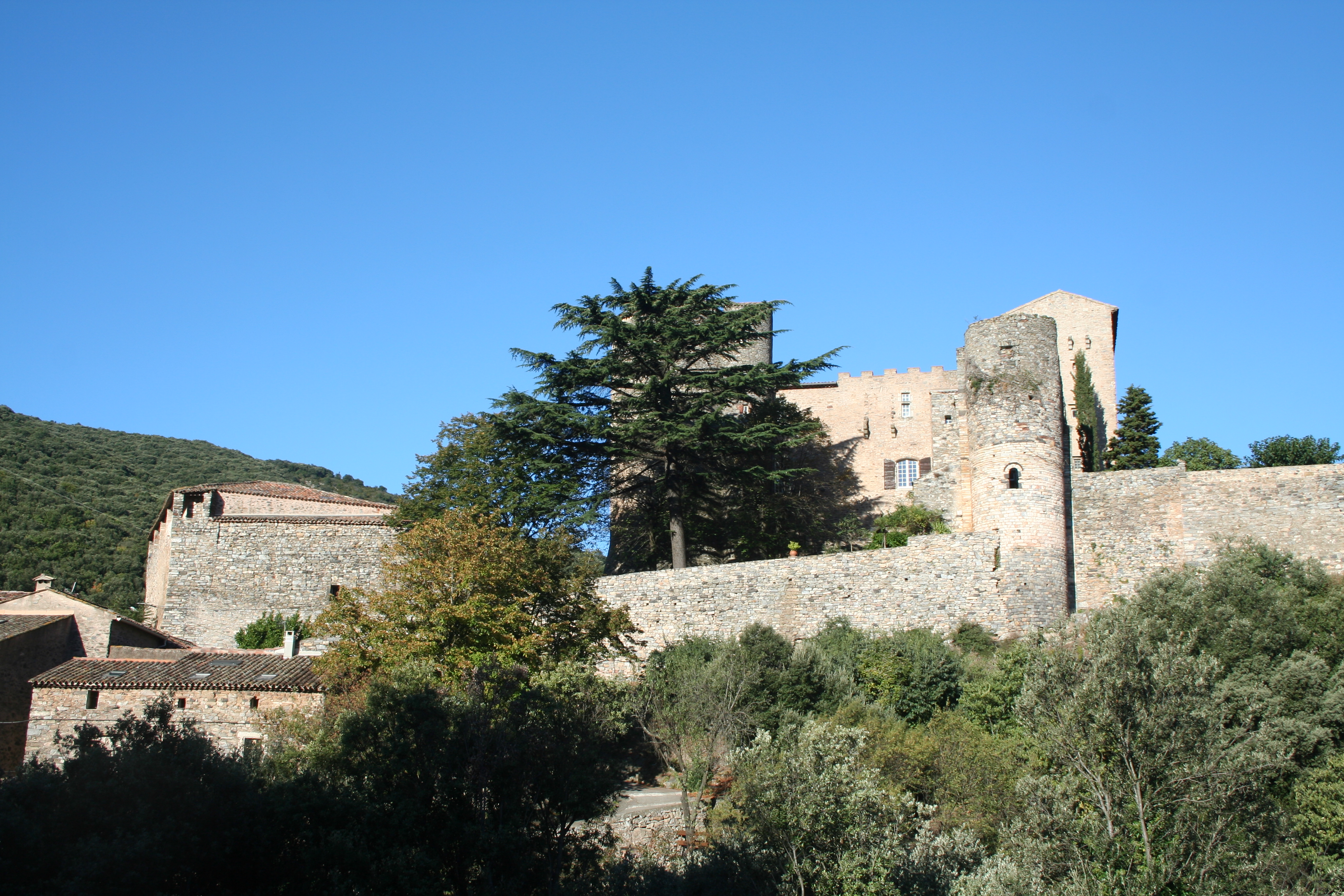

The Château de Pézènes is a castle in the commune of Pézènes-les-Mines in the Hérault département of France.

== History ==
The castle was built on a promontory within a meander of the Peyne river, in a mountainous wild landscape on the trade route from Faugères to Gabian in the 11th and 12th centuries. Many remains from this period are still visible.

In 1539, Guinot de Lauzières, squire, paid homage for his properties, including the castle at Pézènes, to François I.

While never as important as some other sites in the region, it was besieged and taken by Protestant forces in 1569.

In 1885, M. Vernazobres, Mayor of Bedarieux owned the castle.

The castle was restored during the 17th century, and again more recently.

== Description ==
The castle is located on the higher part of the village, surrounded by a fortified enceinte that follows the irregular land surface. Two doorways were opened in this wall during the 17th century. The castle is made up of four buildings closing off a rectangular interior courtyard. The entrance is by two doorways, each with arrowslits, and previously protected by a drawbridge. There is a tower at either end of the castle, rectangular in the north and semicircular in the south. In the east, and part of the castle, is a 12th-century Romanesque chapel whose chevet apse appears to have been raised in the 14th century to make a tower. The door and some of the bays have been colourfully decorated with basalt.

The castle is privately owned and not open to the public. It has been listed since 1981 as a monument historique by the French Ministry of Culture.

== See also ==
- List of castles in France
