= Château de Pézenas =

Ruined medieval castle in Pézenas, France

Coordinates: 43.4353°N 3.4381°E

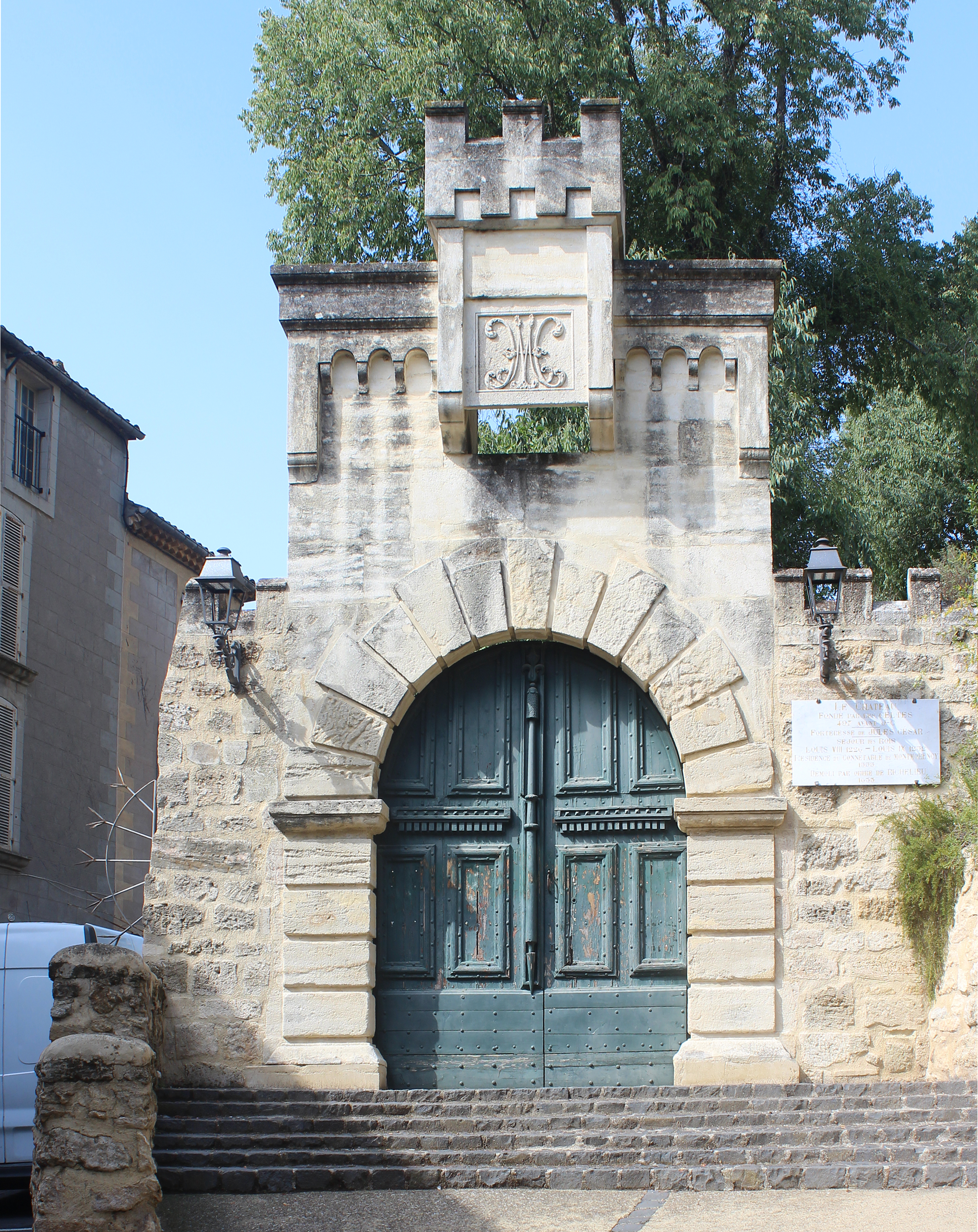
Gateway to the Château

The site of the Château de Pézenas, a ruined medieval castle in the French town of Pézenas, in the département of Hérault.

A castle is first mentioned on the site, a butte just outside and dominating the town, around 990. However, a plaque on the site claims that it was founded by the Celts in 407BC and that the site was also a fortress of Julius Caesar. A document of 1118 records that the Count of Béziers, Bernard Athon, ceded the castellum of Pézenas to his son, Raimon. Louis VIII, in 1226, and Louis IX in 1252, stayed here. The castle became a royal castellany in 1262.

The latest castle was originally built by the Duc de Montmorency, François de Montmorency in 1575 on the domain of Granges des Près. It had seven towers, one of which was used as a chapel. The river, la Peyne, flowed along its walls.

During the 17th century, Cardinal Richelieu, sworn enemy of the Duc de Montmorency Henri II, had promised to abolish the States of the Languedoc, fearing they were too strong and independent of the kingdom of Louis XIII. Following Henri's revolt at the head of the Languedoc States, in 1632 (or 1633, according to tourist information at the site), Richelieu ordered the castle to be destroyed. The inhabitants of Pézenas, so proud of their castle, were humiliated to have to demolish it themselves. Louis XIII gave the materials from the castle, as well as the site, to the Pézenas consuls. The bell, cast by Simon Faillet in 1587, was moved to the top of the bell tower at the Collégiale Saint-Jean church. (The tower later collapsed, in 1733, and had to be rebuilt.)

Passing through the town in 1660, Louis XIV remarked of the castle, "En vérité, Messieurs, c'est grand dommage d'avoir fait démolir cette importante place." ("In truth, Sirs, it is a great pity to have demolished this important place.")

The gateway and the surrounding walls were entirely rebuilt in the early years of the 21st century. The castle site is open to the public on special occasions such as concerts and theatrical presentations.

== Bibliography ==
- Bonnefont, Marie Elise (2003). Pézenas: le temps d'une balade. pp. 6–7 and 52-53. ISBN 2-9520940-0-4.

== See also ==
- List of castles in France
- Pézenas
