= Vendres =

- Commune
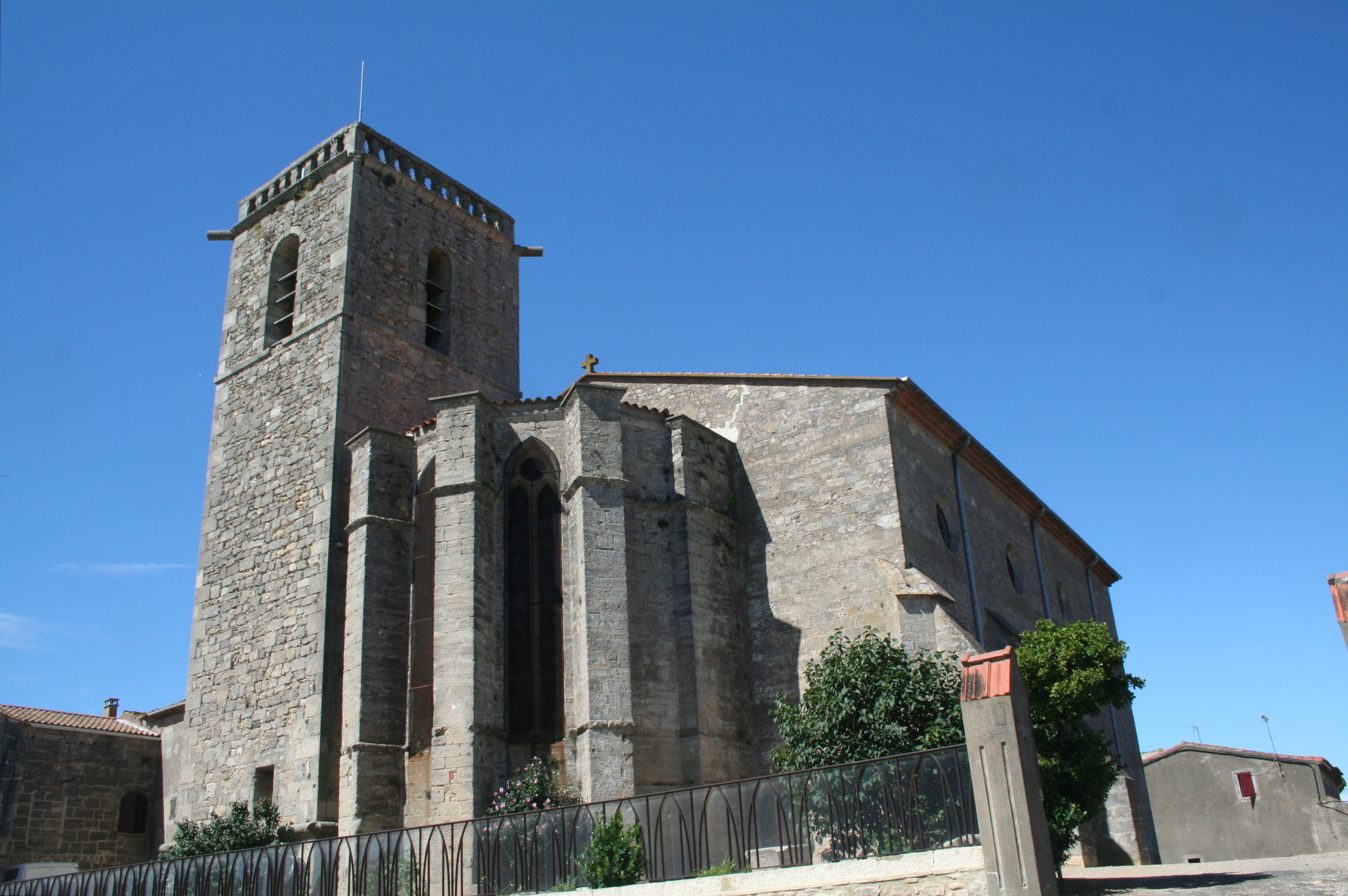
- The church of Vendres

- Coat of arms
- Location of Vendres
- Location within France Location within Occitanie
- Coordinates: 43°16′14″N 3°13′30″E
- Country: France
- Region: Occitania
- Department: Hérault
- Arrondissement: Béziers
- Canton: Béziers-1
- Intercommunality: Domitienne

Government
  - Mayor (2020–2026): Jean-Pierre Perez
- Area^{1}: 37.8 km^{2} (14.6 sq mi)
- Elevation: 25 m (82 ft)
- Highest elevation: 64 m (210 ft)
- Lowest elevation: 0 m (0 ft)
- Population (2023): 2,616
  - Density: 69.2/km^{2} (179/sq mi)
- Time zone: UTC+01:00 (CET)
  - Summer (DST): UTC+02:00 (CEST)
- INSEE/Postal code: 34329 /34350
- ^{1} French Land Register data, which excludes lakes, ponds, glaciers > 1 km^{2} (0.386 sq mi or 247 acres) and river estuaries.

Vendres (French pronunciation: [vɑ̃dʁ]; Languedocien: Vèndres) is a commune in the Hérault department in the Occitanie region in southern France.

== Population ==
Historical population
| Year | Pop. | ±% p.a. |
|---|---|---|
| 1968 | 879 | — |
| 1975 | 781 | −1.67% |
| 1982 | 885 | +1.80% |
| 1990 | 1,230 | +4.20% |
| 1999 | 1,549 | +2.60% |
| 2007 | 2,047 | +3.55% |
| 2012 | 2,542 | +4.43% |
| 2017 | 2,702 | +1.23% |
| 2023 | 2,616 | −0.54% |
Source: INSEE

== Sights ==
The French Ministry of Culture lists three sites with protection as a monument historique.

- The Château de Vendres, a 13th-century castle, has been protected as a monument historique since 1926. The remains include the curtain wall and a fortified gateway.
- The so-called Temple of Venus is a Roman villa, protected as a monument historique since 1935. The inhabitants of Vendres would like to think that the name of the village is derived from the goddess. The villa seems to have been constructed in the first century AD on a site that dominates the present lagoon, though then the open sea. Excavated in the 17th century by Dominique de Bonsi, the site has since been interpreted in very different ways. The myth of a temple was an early 20th century idea, originated by Félix Mouret; Fernand Benoit suggested a salting works in 1965. Monique Clavel-Lévêque suggested in 1970 that the site was a rather luxurious villa and the latest excavations, by Ludovic Le Roy in 2008, confirm this view. The site was built on a raised level to permit under floor heating. It underwent several alterations between the 1st and 5th centuries.
- The remains of the so-called Roman aqueduct probably date more accurately to the 17th century. They have been protected as a monument historique since 1926.
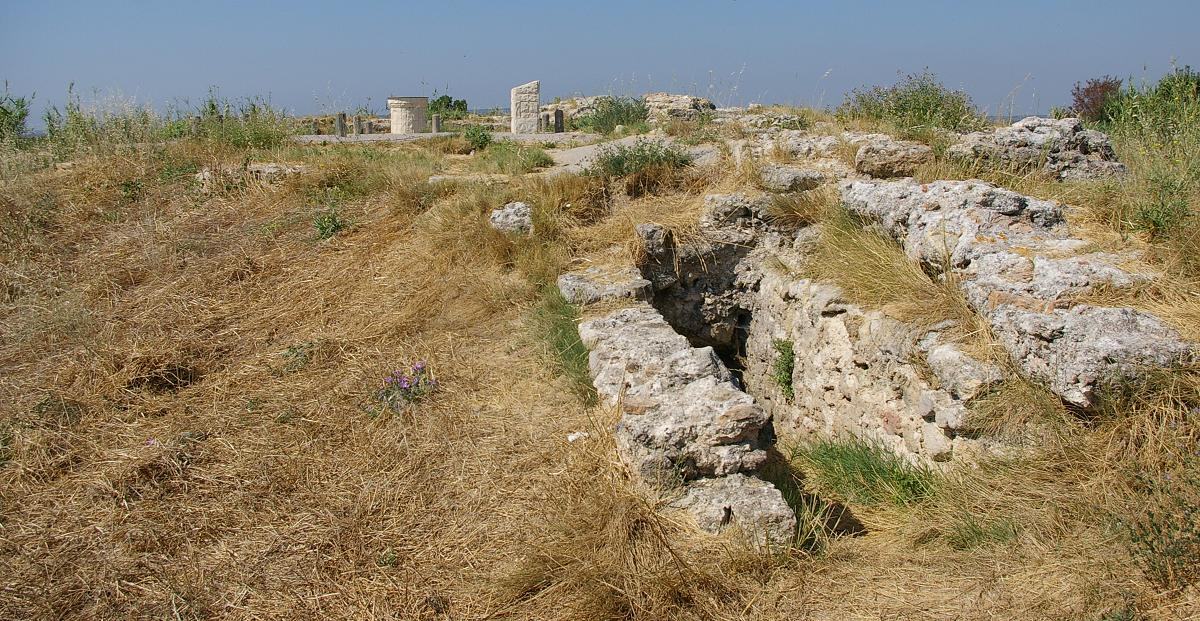
Roman villa

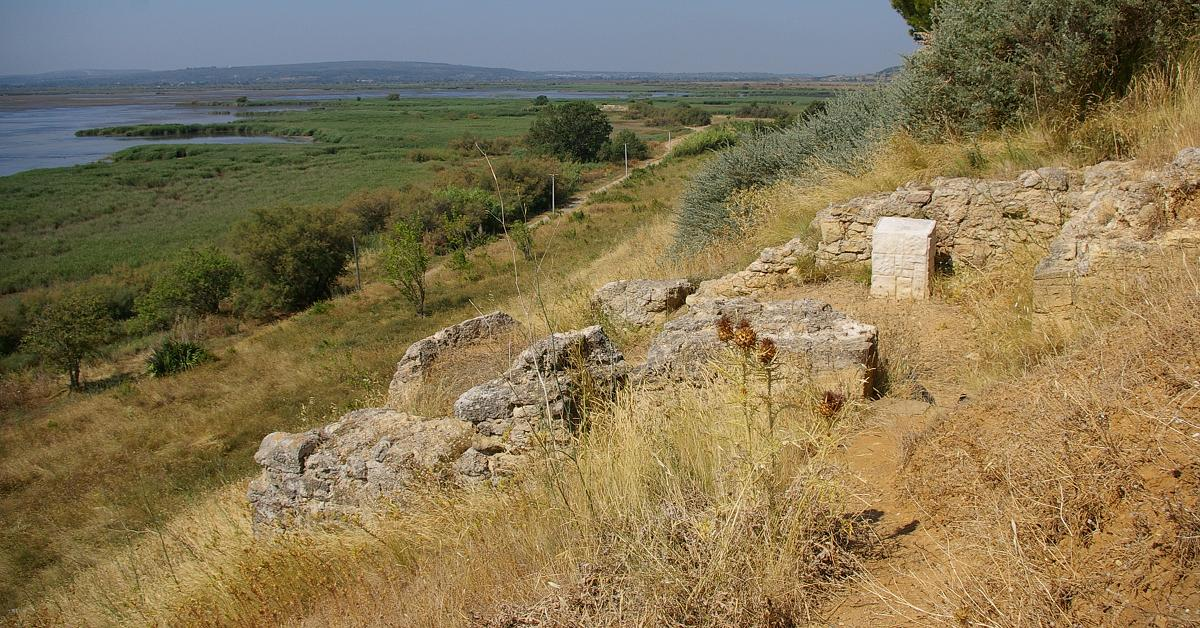
"Roman" aqueduct

== See also ==
- Communes of the Hérault department
