= Château des Guilhem =

Medieval castle in Hérault, France

Coordinates: 43°37′47″N 3°25′42″E

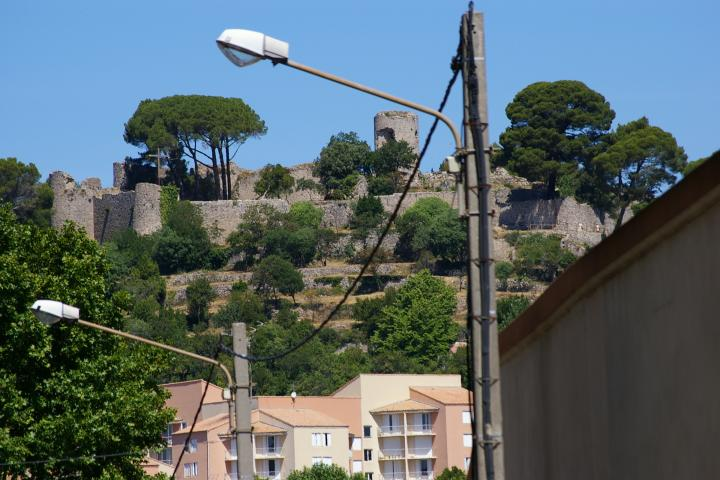
The castle stands above the town of Clermont-l'Hérault.

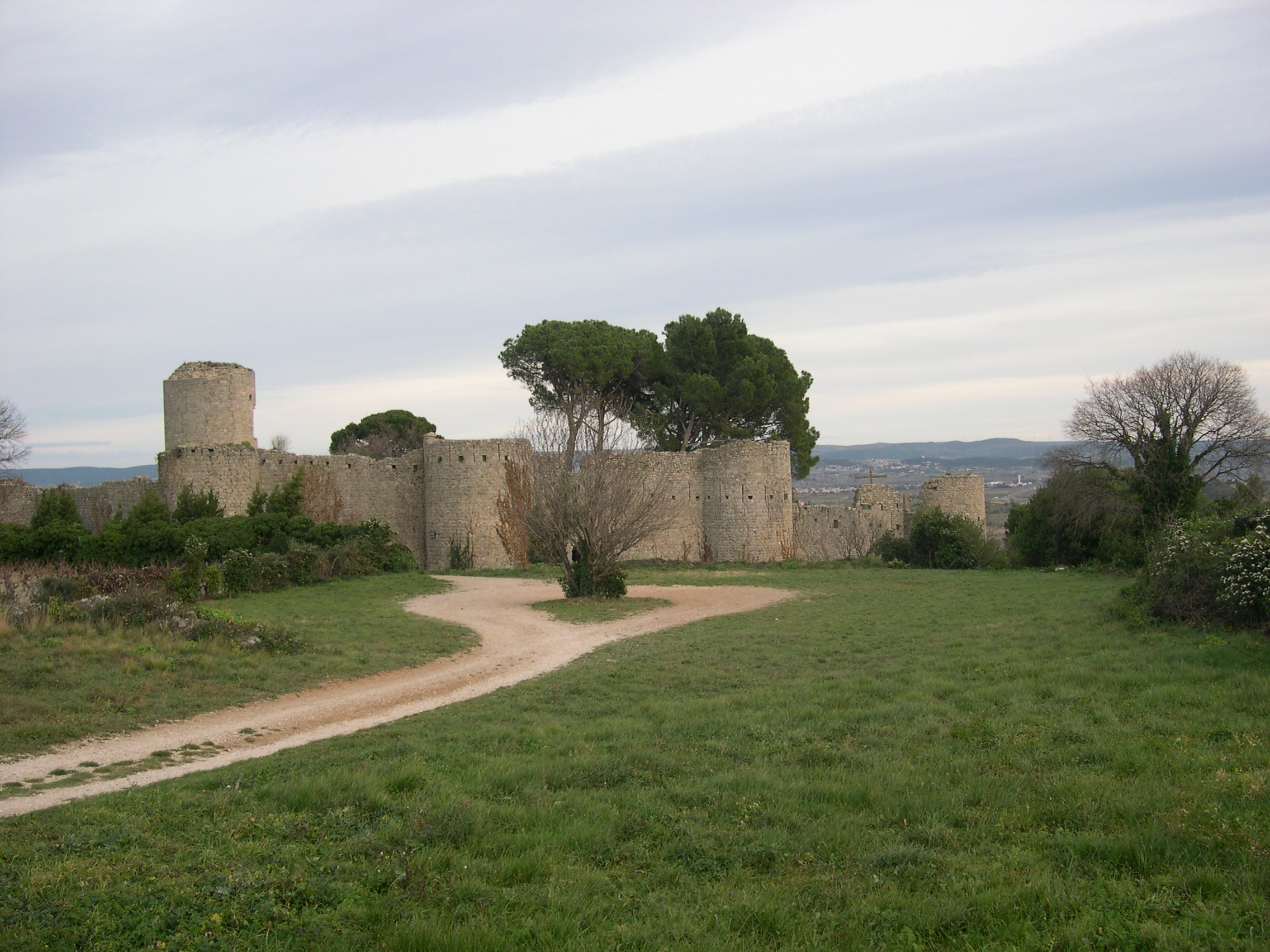
The castle

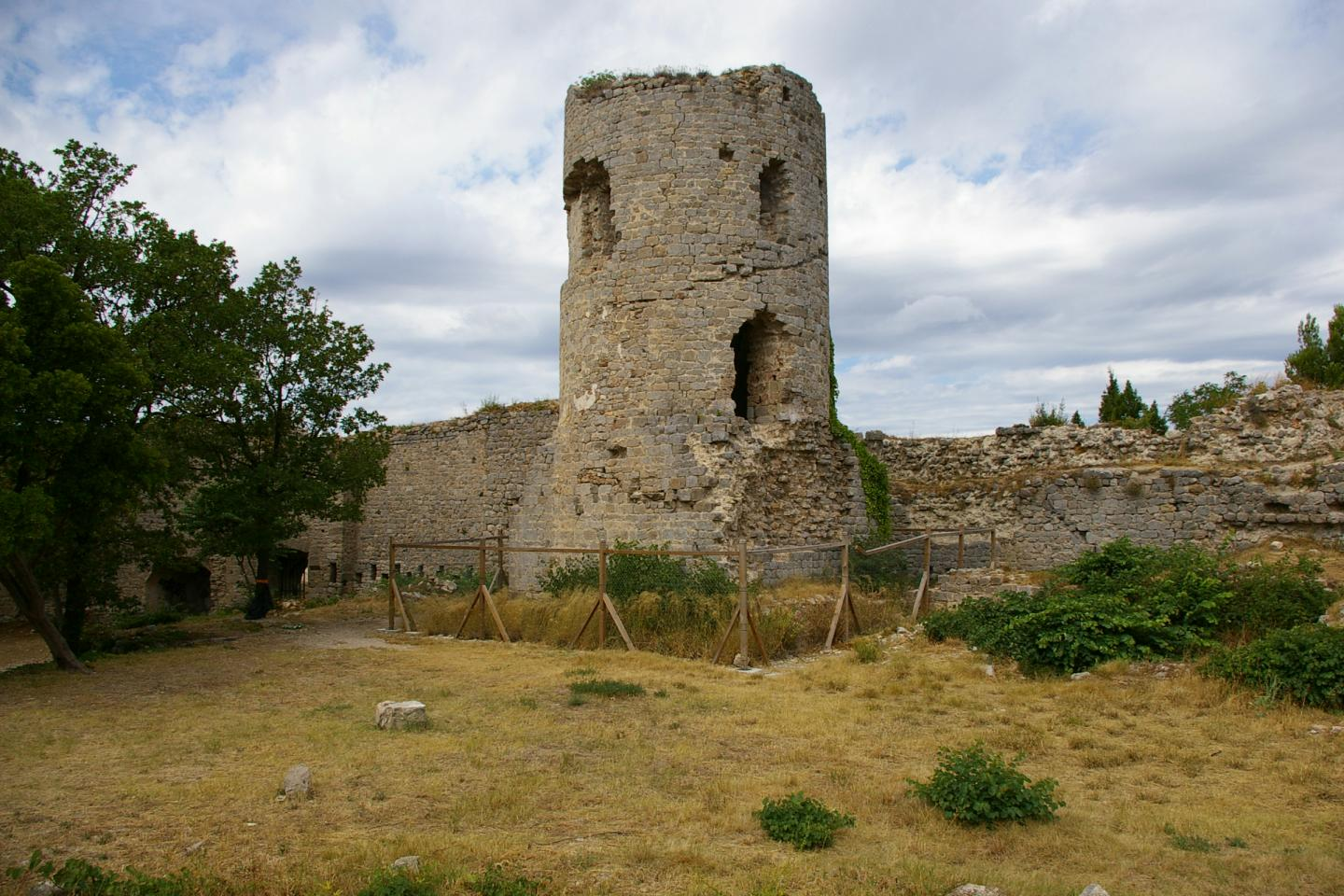
Tour Guilhem

The Château des Guilhem is a medieval castle in the town of Clermont-l'Hérault in the Hérault département of France.

== History ==
Built for the Guilhems, lords of Clermont-l’Hérault, at the end of the 11th and beginning of the 12th centuries, the castle stands on Puech Castel hill, overlooking the town and surrounding country. The strategic site permitted control of the Hérault valley, the road to Bédarieux and the higher cantons, as well as the feudal town which was itself fortified soon after the castle was built. There is some evidence that earlier buildings existed.

After a number of troubled periods when the castle provided shelter for the local population, it was slowly abandoned in the 16th century. Owing to its largely abandoned state, it escaped Cardinal Richelieu's widespread destruction of castles. However, its abandonment and the ravages of time have caused serious deterioration: the only remnants are the fortifications, two vaulted halls and the Guilhem Tower (tour Guilhem) which still stands above the town. There is a grand panorama of the Hérault plain.

The castle has been listed as a monument historique by the French Ministry of Culture since 1927 and received some preservation works in 2007. The castle site is open daily to visitors, though access to the tower is impossible. On 1 October 2009, the castle was closed due to a risk of falling stones. It was reopened on 12 August 2013.

== See also ==
- List of castles in France
- Castles in Hérault
- Clermont-l'Hérault
