= Bélarga =

- Commune
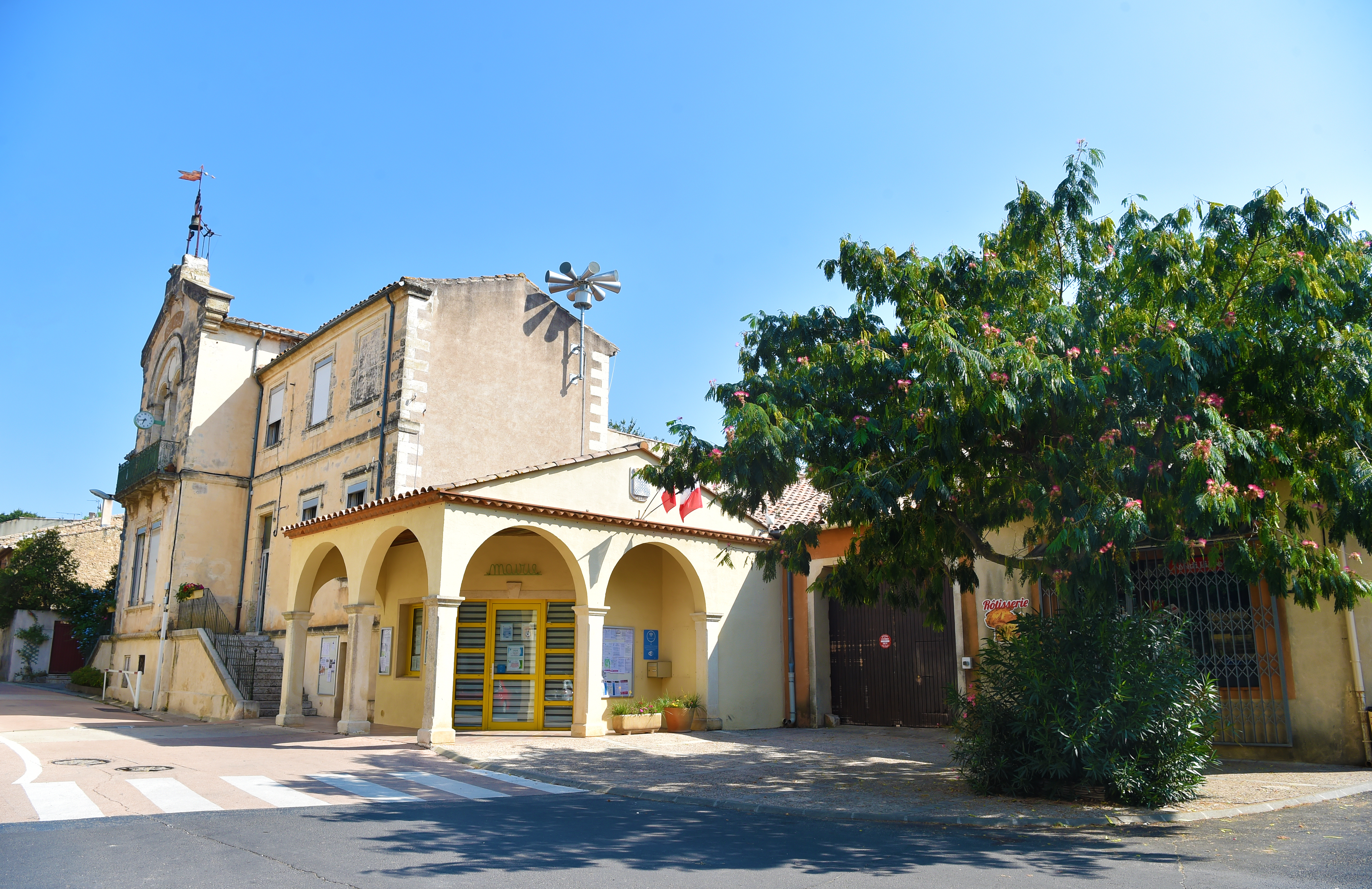
- Bélarga

- Coat of arms
- Location of Bélarga
- Location within France Location within Occitanie
- Coordinates: 43°33′12″N 3°29′15″E
- Country: France
- Region: Occitania
- Department: Hérault
- Arrondissement: Lodève
- Canton: Gignac
- Intercommunality: Vallée de l'Hérault

Government
  - Mayor (2020–2026): José Martinez
- Area^{1}: 4.13 km^{2} (1.59 sq mi)
- Elevation: 27 m (89 ft)
- Highest elevation: 84 m (276 ft)
- Lowest elevation: 17 m (56 ft)
- Population (2023): 664
  - Density: 161/km^{2} (416/sq mi)
- Time zone: UTC+01:00 (CET)
  - Summer (DST): UTC+02:00 (CEST)
- INSEE/Postal code: 34029 /34230
- ^{1} French Land Register data, which excludes lakes, ponds, glaciers > 1 km^{2} (0.386 sq mi or 247 acres) and river estuaries.

Bélarga (French pronunciation: [belaʁɡa]; Languedocien: Belargan) is a commune in the Hérault département in the Occitanie region in southern France.

== Geography ==
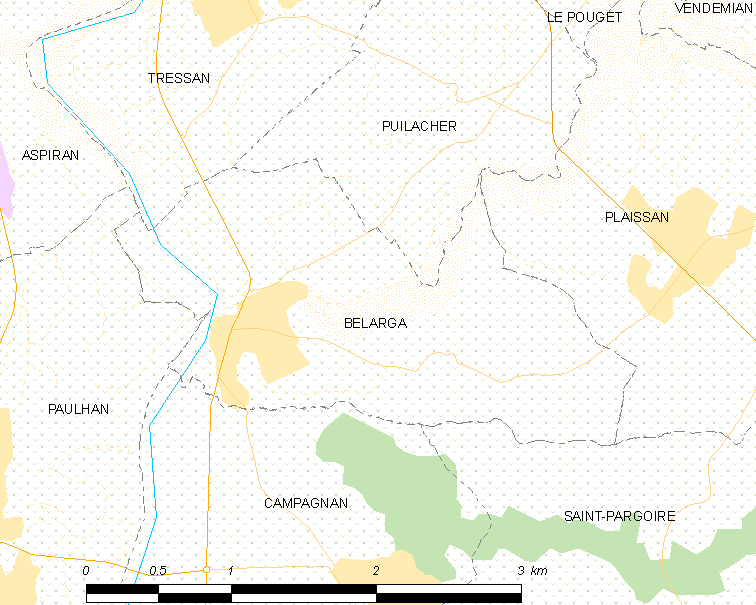
Map

=== Climate ===
In 2010, the climate of the commune is classified as a frank Mediterranean climate, according to a study based on a dataset covering the 1971-2000 period. In 2020, Météo-France published a typology of climates in mainland France in which the commune is exposed to a Mediterranean climate and is part of the Provence, Languedoc-Roussillon climatic region, characterized by low rainfall in summer, very good sunshine (2,600 h/year), a hot summer 21.5 °C (71 °F), very dry air in summer, dry conditions in all seasons, strong winds (with a frequency of 40 to 50% for winds > 5 m/s), and little fog.

For the period from 1971 to 2000, the average annual temperature was 14.6 °C (58 °F) with an annual atmospheric temperature of 16.3 °C (61 °F). The average annual total rainfall during this period was 641 mm, with 5.9 days of precipitation in January and 2.6 days in July. For the subsequent period of 1991 to 2020, the average annual temperature observed at the nearest weather station, located in the commune of Saint-André-de-Sangonis, 10.79 kilometres (7 mi) away as the crow flies, is 15.5 °C (60 °F), and the average annual total rainfall is 652.4 mm.

For the future, climate parameters for the commune projected for 2050, based on different greenhouse gas emission scenarios, can be consulted on a dedicated website published by Météo-France in November 2022.

== Population ==
Historical population

Year	Pop.	±% p.a.
1793	256	—
1800	263	+0.39%
1806	279	+0.99%
1821	273	−0.14%
1831	369	+3.06%
1836	330	−2.21%
1841	341	+0.66%
1846	331	−0.59%
1851	341	+0.60%
1856	331	−0.59%
1861	375	+2.53%
1866	392	+0.89%
1872	374	−0.78%
1876	362	−0.81%
1881	286	−4.60%
1886	326	+2.65%
1891	295	−1.98%
1896	328	+2.14%
1901	336	+0.48%

Year	Pop.	±% p.a.
1906	340	+0.24%
1911	373	+1.87%
1921	321	−1.49%
1926	316	−0.31%
1931	288	−1.84%
1936	295	+0.48%
1946	296	+0.03%
1954	254	−1.89%
1962	250	−0.20%
1968	247	−0.20%
1975	228	−1.14%
1982	245	+1.03%
1990	241	−0.21%
1999	258	+0.76%
2007	413	+6.06%
2012	452	+1.82%
2017	632	+6.93%
2023	664	+0.83%

Source: Ldh/EHESS/Cassini until 1999, and INSEE since 2007.

== Sites and monuments ==
- Château de Bélarga

== See also ==
- Communes of the Hérault department
