= Roquessels =

- Commune
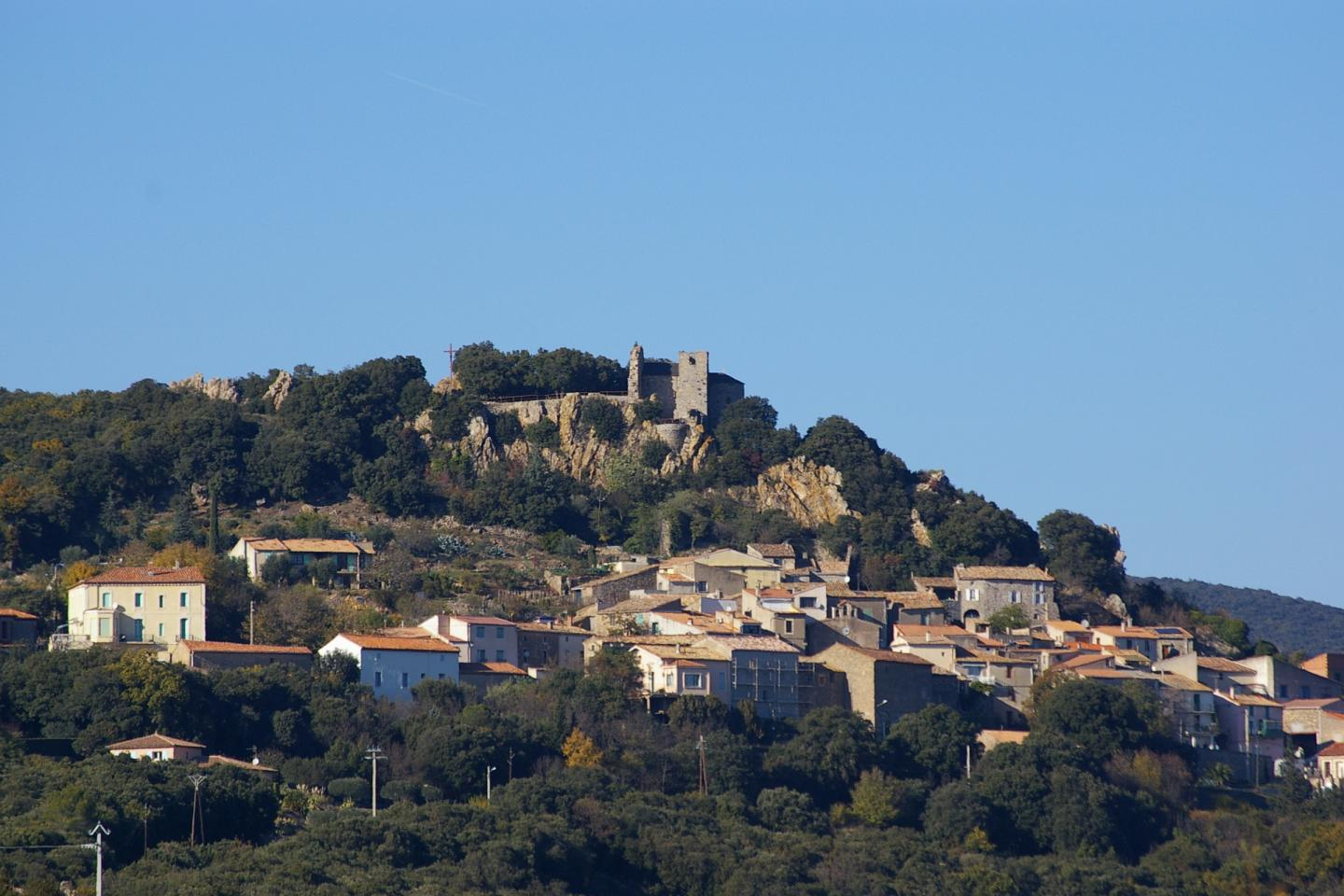
- A general view of Roquessels

- Coat of arms
- Location of Roquessels
- Location within France Location within Occitanie
- Coordinates: 43°33′10″N 3°13′27″E
- Country: France
- Region: Occitania
- Department: Hérault
- Arrondissement: Béziers
- Canton: Cazouls-lès-Béziers
- Intercommunality: CC Les Avant-Monts

Government
  - Mayor (2025–2026): Charleyne Boudal
- Area^{1}: 89.8 km^{2} (34.7 sq mi)
- Elevation: 190 m (620 ft)
- Highest elevation: 440 m (1,440 ft)
- Lowest elevation: 138 m (453 ft)
- Population (2023): 119
  - Density: 1.33/km^{2} (3.43/sq mi)
- Time zone: UTC+01:00 (CET)
  - Summer (DST): UTC+02:00 (CEST)
- INSEE/Postal code: 34234 /34320
- ^{1} French Land Register data, which excludes lakes, ponds, glaciers > 1 km^{2} (0.386 sq mi or 247 acres) and river estuaries.

Roquessels (French pronunciation: [ʁɔkəsɛl]; Languedocien: Ròcacèls) is a commune in the Hérault department in the Occitanie region in southern France.

== Population ==
Historical population
Year	Pop.	±% p.a.
1968	112	—
1975	115	+0.38%
1982	97	−2.40%
1990	123	+3.01%
1999	123	+0.00%
2007	131	+0.79%
2012	112	−3.09%
2017	104	−1.47%
2023	119	+2.27%
Source: INSEE

Inhabitants of Roquessels are called Roquesselois in French.

== Winemaking ==
Roquessels is one of the seven communes which produces Faugères AOC wine.

== Sights ==
Above the village stands the ruined mediaeval castle, the Château de Roquessels. The castle chapel still stands and is a listed historic site.

== See also ==
- Communes of the Hérault department
