= Autignac =

- Commune
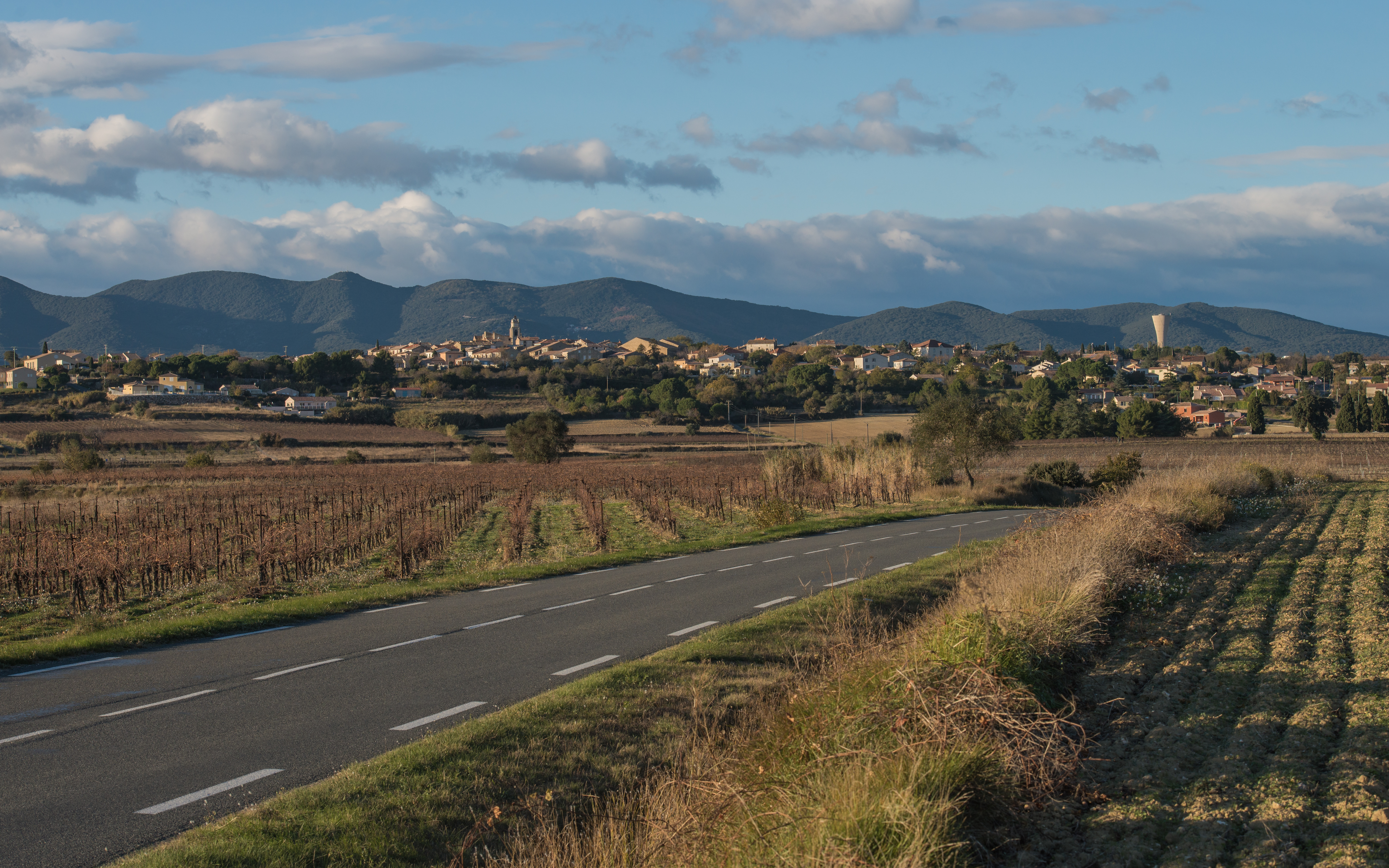
- A general view of Autignac

- Coat of arms
- Location of Autignac
- Location within France Location within Occitanie
- Coordinates: 43°30′N 3°10′E
- Country: France
- Region: Occitania
- Department: Hérault
- Arrondissement: Béziers
- Canton: Cazouls-lès-Béziers
- Intercommunality: CC Les Avant-Monts

Government
  - Mayor (2020–2026): Jean-Claude Marchi
- Area^{1}: 11.55 km^{2} (4.46 sq mi)
- Elevation: 57 m (187 ft)
- Highest elevation: 205 m (673 ft)
- Lowest elevation: 79 m (259 ft)
- Population (2023): 982
  - Density: 85.0/km^{2} (220/sq mi)
- Time zone: UTC+01:00 (CET)
  - Summer (DST): UTC+02:00 (CEST)
- INSEE/Postal code: 34018 /34480
- ^{1} French Land Register data, which excludes lakes, ponds, glaciers > 1 km^{2} (0.386 sq mi or 247 acres) and river estuaries.

Autignac (French pronunciation: [otiɲak]; Languedocien: Autinhac) is a commune in the Hérault department in southern France.

== Winemaking ==
Autignac is one of the seven communes which produces Faugères AOC wine.

== Population ==
Historical population
Year	Pop.	±% p.a.
1968	1,005	—
1975	910	−1.41%
1982	948	+0.59%
1990	698	−3.75%
1999	729	+0.48%
2007	798	+1.14%
2012	875	+1.86%
2017	911	+0.81%
2023	982	+1.26%
Source: INSEE

== See also ==
- Communes of the Hérault department
