= Château de Ganges =

Castle in Hérault, France

Coordinates: 43°56′06″N 3°42′33″E

The Château de Ganges was a castle in the commune of Ganges in the Hérault département of France. Only ruins remain.

== History ==
The castle was the scene of a murder in the 17th century. The beautiful Dianne de Roussan was killed by her husband's brothers, who wanted her large fortune. They were caught and subsequently executed.

== See also ==
- List of castles in France
