= Cabrerolles =

- Commune
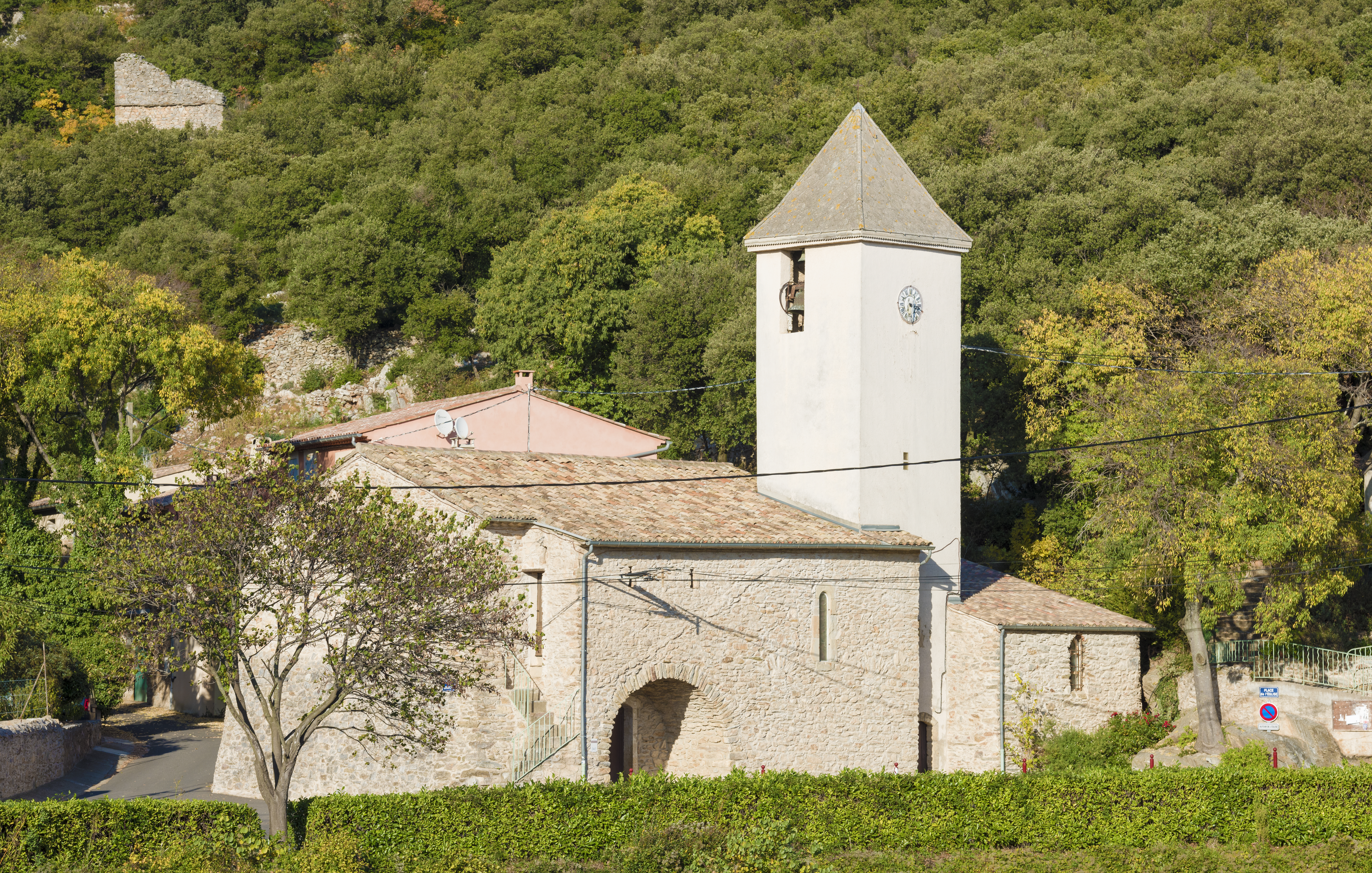
- Church of Saint-Amand

- Coat of arms
- Location of Cabrerolles
- Location within France Location within Occitanie
- Coordinates: 43°32′45″N 3°07′34″E
- Country: France
- Region: Occitania
- Department: Hérault
- Arrondissement: Béziers
- Canton: Cazouls-lès-Béziers
- Intercommunality: Les Avant-Monts

Government
  - Mayor (2020–2026): Séverine Saur
- Area^{1}: 28.68 km^{2} (11.07 sq mi)
- Elevation: 310 m (1,020 ft)
- Highest elevation: 705 m (2,313 ft)
- Lowest elevation: 134 m (440 ft)
- Population (2023): 343
  - Density: 12.0/km^{2} (31.0/sq mi)
- Time zone: UTC+01:00 (CET)
  - Summer (DST): UTC+02:00 (CEST)
- INSEE/Postal code: 34044 /34480
- ^{1} French Land Register data, which excludes lakes, ponds, glaciers > 1 km^{2} (0.386 sq mi or 247 acres) and river estuaries.

Cabrerolles (French pronunciation: [kabʁəʁɔl]; Languedocien: Cabrairòlas) is a commune in the Hérault department in southern France.

== Winemaking ==
Cabrerolles is one of the seven communes which produces Faugères AOC wine. As well as the main village, it has three hamlets, Lentheric, Liquière and Aigues-Vives, which all produce wine.

== Population ==
Historical population
Year	Pop.	±% p.a.
1968	284	—
1975	256	−1.47%
1982	255	−0.06%
1990	293	+1.75%
1999	270	−0.90%
2007	334	+2.69%
2012	349	+0.88%
2017	335	−0.82%
2023	343	+0.39%
Source: INSEE

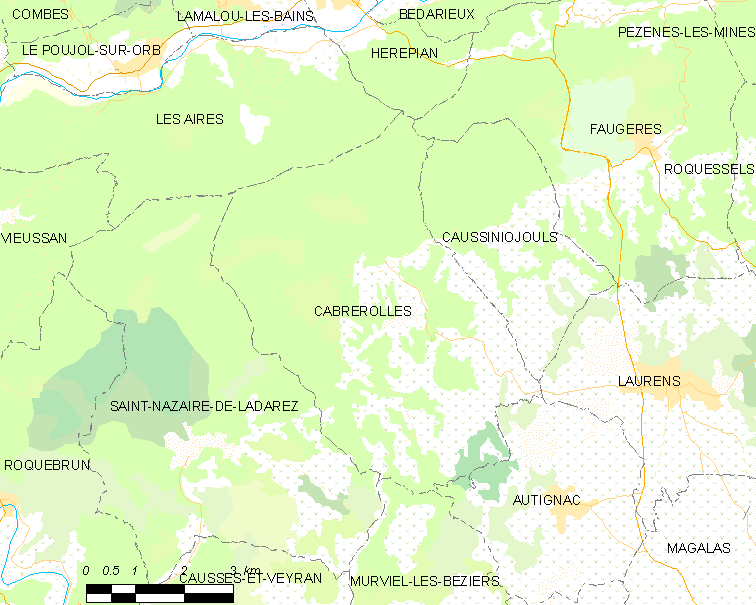
Map

== See also ==
- Communes of the Hérault department
