= Clermont-l'Hérault =

- Commune
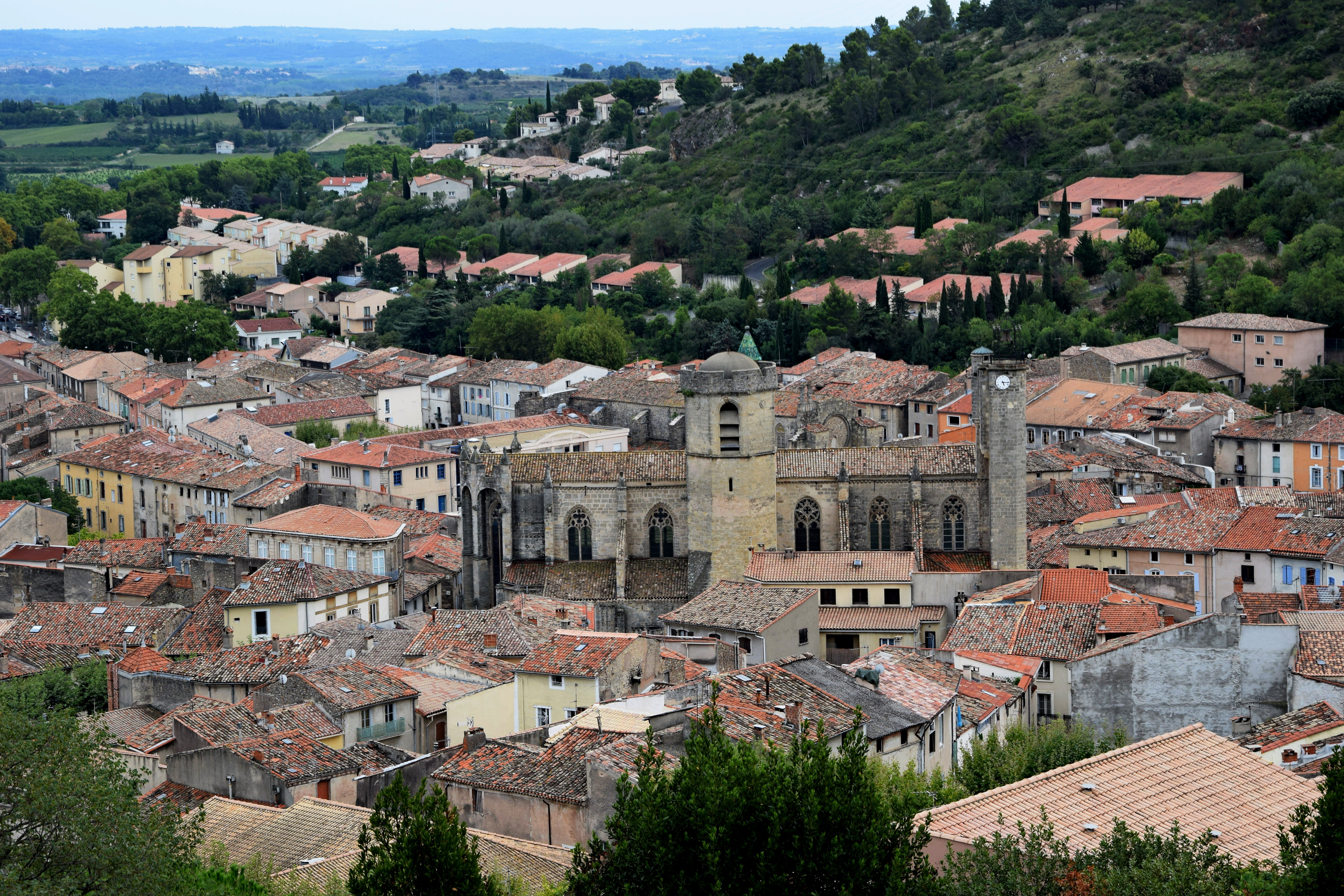
- View of Clermont-l'Hérault's City centre

- Coat of arms
- Location of Clermont-l'Hérault
- Location within France Location within Occitanie
- Coordinates: 43°37′41″N 3°25′59″E
- Country: France
- Region: Occitania
- Department: Hérault
- Arrondissement: Lodève
- Canton: Clermont-l'Hérault
- Intercommunality: Clermontais

Government
  - Mayor (2020–2026): Gérard Bessière
- Area^{1}: 32.49 km^{2} (12.54 sq mi)
- Elevation: 92 m (302 ft)
- Highest elevation: 322 m (1,056 ft)
- Lowest elevation: 40 m (130 ft)
- Population (2023): 9,461
  - Density: 291.2/km^{2} (754.2/sq mi)
- Time zone: UTC+01:00 (CET)
  - Summer (DST): UTC+02:00 (CEST)
- INSEE/Postal code: 34079 /34800
- ^{1} French Land Register data, which excludes lakes, ponds, glaciers > 1 km^{2} (0.386 sq mi or 247 acres) and river estuaries.

Clermont-l'Hérault (French pronunciation: [klɛʁmɔ̃ leʁo]; Occitan: Clarmont d'Erau) is a commune in the Hérault department in southern France.

== Geography ==
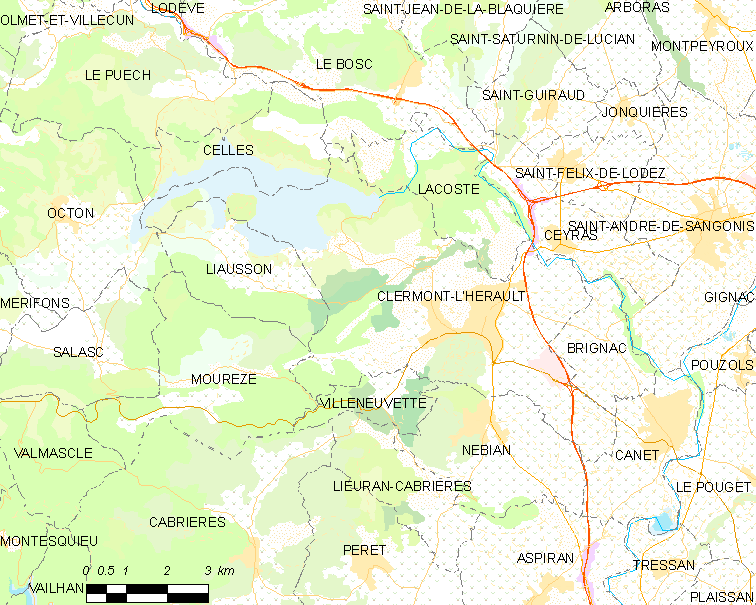
Map

Chief town of the Canton, Clermont-l'Hérault is located about 40 km west of Montpellier, halfway between the Mediterranean Sea to the south and the Cévennes National Park to the north.

=== Hydrography ===
La Lergue, Le Salagou, Ruisseau des Servières are the main rivers that cross the town.

=== Climate ===
The city enjoys a Mediterranean climate. The winter is mild, despite occasional frosts. Summer is hot. In autumn, Mediterranean episodes occur bringing intense and heavy rainfall.

== History ==
The site of Clermont-l'Hérault has been inhabited since Protohistory: during the Iron Age (6th century BC), Clermont constitutes one of the main Oppida of the Celtic Mediterranean.

Recent archaeological excavations have demonstrated its importance during antiquity (INRAP, 2000s). There was then a main agglomeration of five to six hectares and a peripheral inhabited area of 12 hectares. The remains of a thermal establishment have been uncovered.

The town was several times taken and retaken in the religious wars of the 16th century. The city was formerly known as Clermont-Lodève. The manufacture of sheets was established at nearby Villeneuvette, or rather relaunched in 1667 by Colbert to develop the cloth industry in France, taking advantage of the waters of the Dourbie.

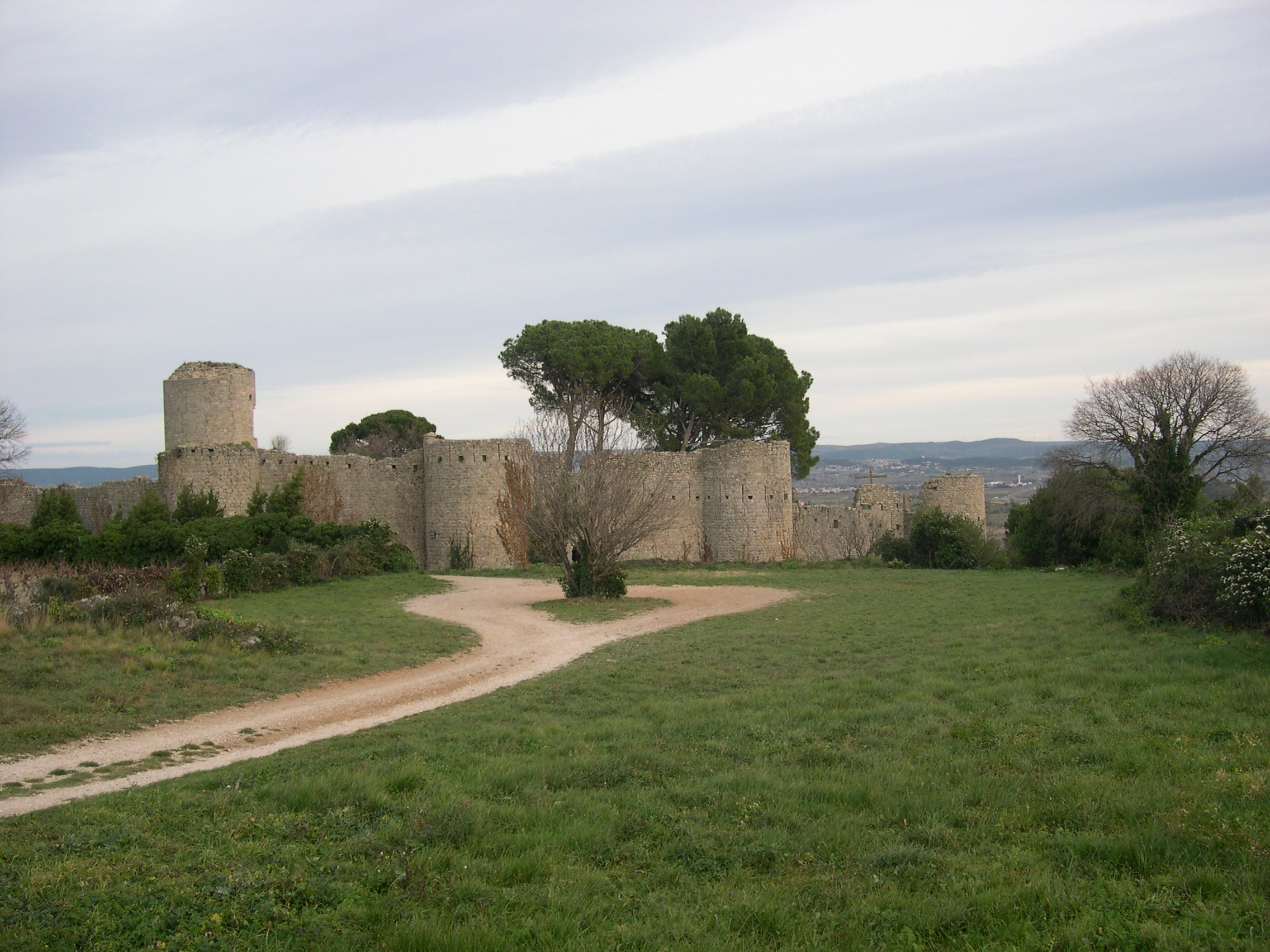
Château des Guilhem

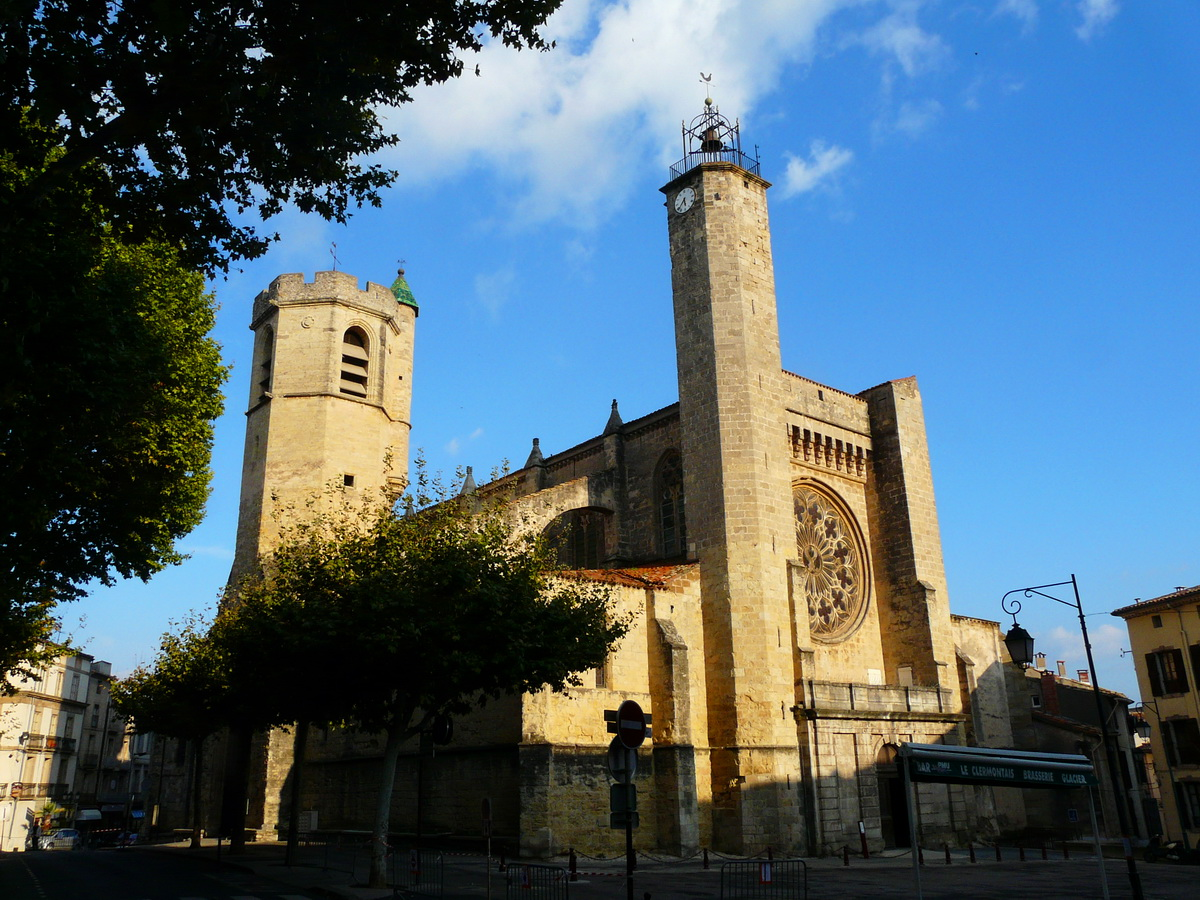
Collégiale Saint-Paul de Clermont-l'Hérault

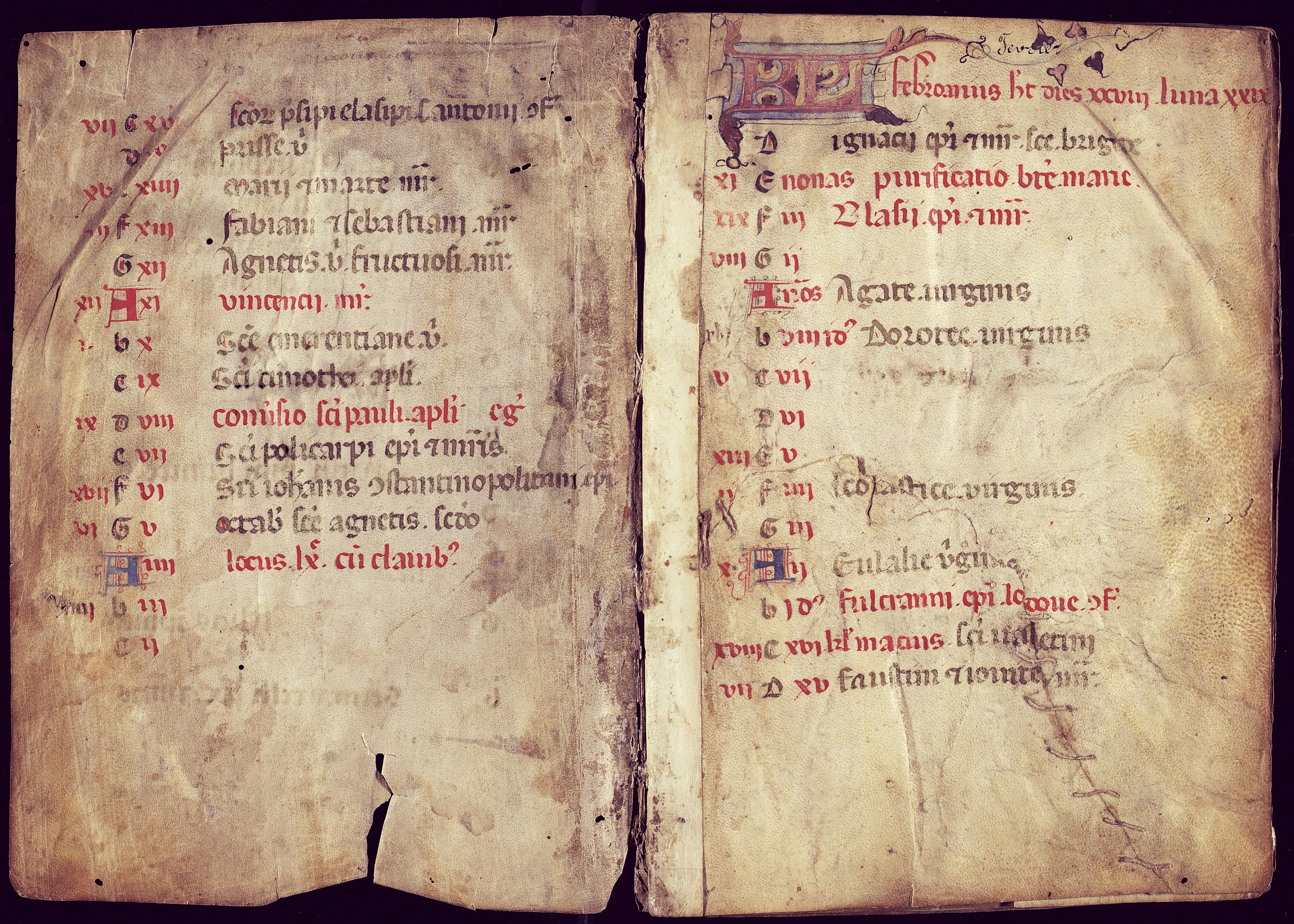
Julian calendar. Leudaire of the jurisdiction of Clermont

== Politics and administration ==
Election	Mayor	Party	Occupation
1971	Marcel Vidal	PS	Winemaker; Member of the Senate for Hérault
1977	Marcel Vidal	PS	Winemaker; Member of the Senate for Hérault
1983	Marcel Vidal	PS	Winemaker; Member of the Senate for Hérault
1989	Marcel Vidal	PS	Winemaker; Member of the Senate for Hérault
1995	Marcel Vidal	PS	Winemaker; Member of the Senate for Hérault
2001	Alain Cazorla	PS	
2008	Alain Cazorla	PS	
2014	Salvador Ruiz	DVG	Teacher

== Population ==
Historical population

Year	Pop.	±% p.a.
1793	4,888	—
1800	5,224	+0.95%
1806	5,694	+1.45%
1821	5,837	+0.17%
1831	6,199	+0.60%
1836	6,582	+1.21%
1841	6,294	−0.89%
1846	6,134	−0.51%
1851	6,180	+0.15%
1856	6,232	+0.17%
1861	6,405	+0.55%
1866	6,050	−1.13%
1872	5,870	−0.50%
1876	5,964	+0.40%
1881	5,450	−1.79%
1886	5,191	−0.97%
1891	5,079	−0.44%
1896	5,083	+0.02%
1901	5,280	+0.76%

Year	Pop.	±% p.a.
1906	5,140	−0.54%
1911	5,177	+0.14%
1921	5,381	+0.39%
1926	5,616	+0.86%
1931	5,657	+0.15%
1936	5,426	−0.83%
1946	5,195	−0.43%
1954	5,314	+0.28%
1962	5,538	+0.52%
1968	6,209	+1.92%
1975	5,482	−1.76%
1982	5,926	+1.12%
1990	6,041	+0.24%
1999	6,532	+0.87%
2007	7,305	+1.41%
2012	8,221	+2.39%
2017	8,852	+1.49%
2023	9,461	+1.12%

Source: EHESS and INSEE (1968-2023)

== Sights ==
The town is built on the slope of a hill ("Pioch Castel") which is crowned by an ancient castle (Château des Guilhem) and skirted by the Rhonel, a tributary of the Lergue. It has a southern Gothic style chapel "Les Pénitents" (The Penitents) that has been recently restored. It is now a cultural centre. Also of interest is Saint Paul's church, begun in the 12th century, and finished in the 14th century.

Close by is the large man-made Lac du Salagou.

== International relations ==
Clermont-l'Hérault is twinned with:

- (Italy) San Gimignano
- (United Kingdom) Patchway
- (Germany) Gauting

== See also ==
- Communes of the Hérault department
