= Malpas Tunnel =

Canal tunnel in France

Coordinates: 43°18′26″N 3°7′36″E

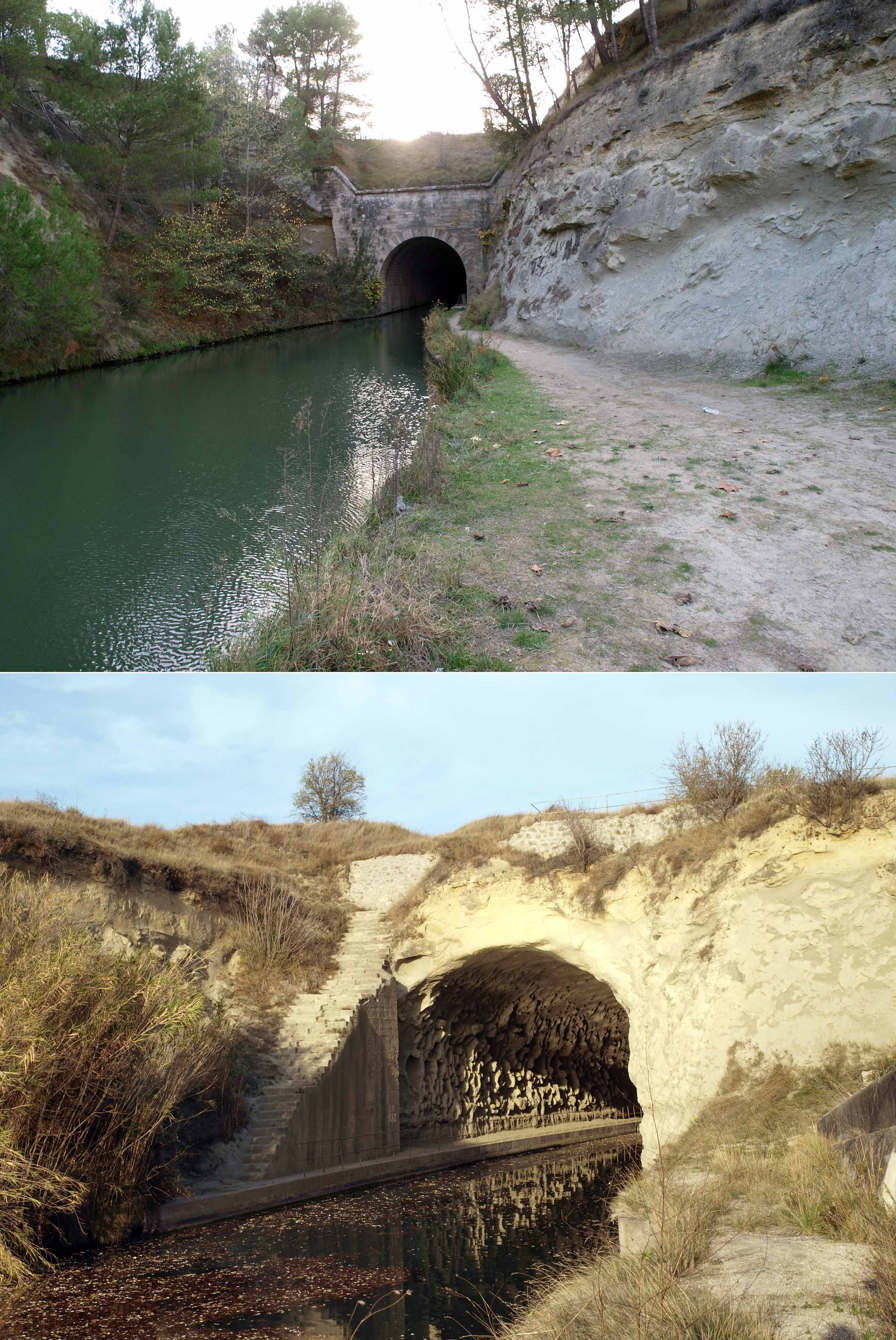
The Malpas tunnel on the Canal du Midi

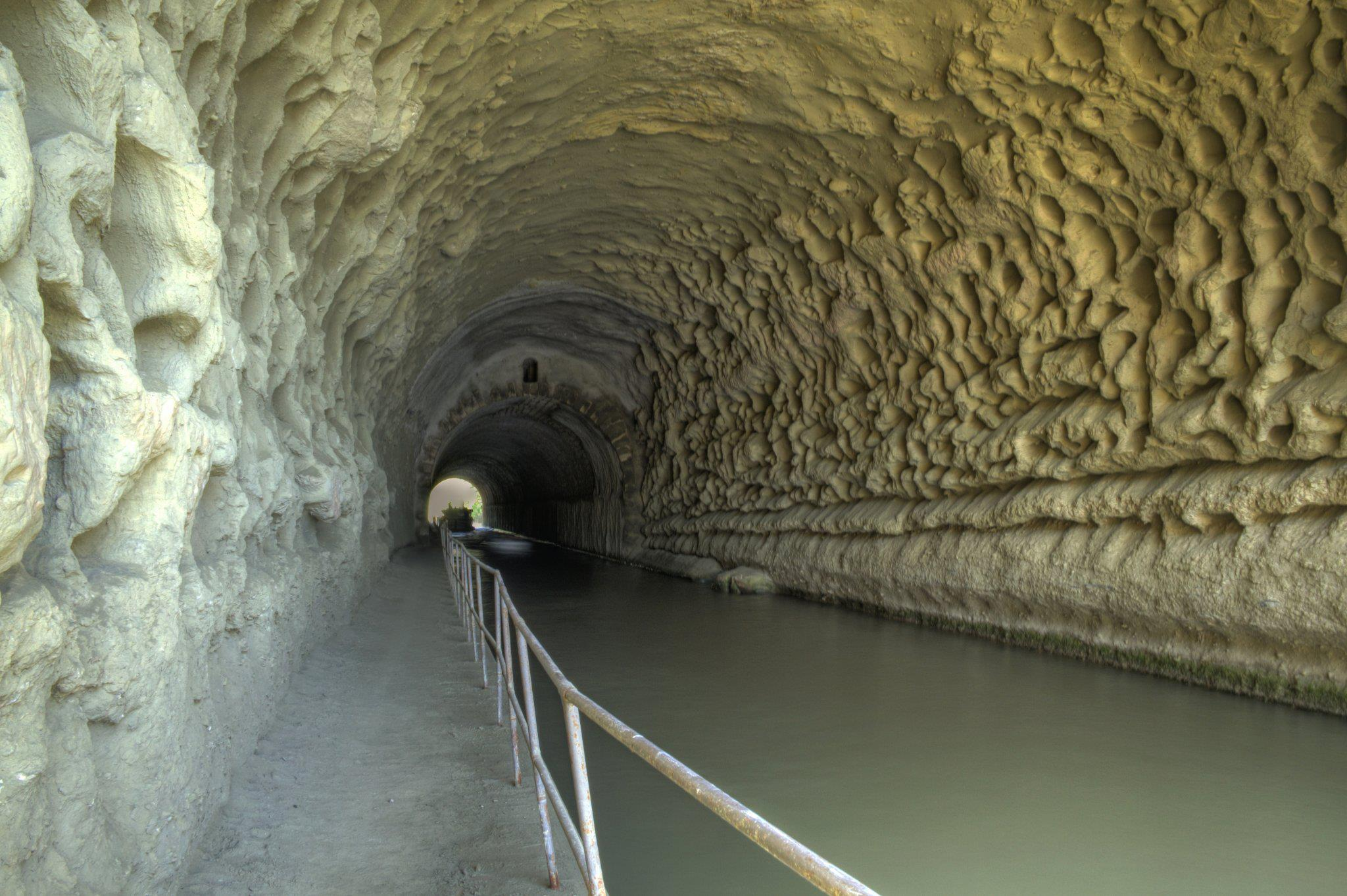
Inside the tunnel

The Malpas tunnel carries the Canal du Midi under the d'Ensérune hill in Hérault, France. Excavated in 1679, it was Europe's first navigable canal tunnel and is a monument to the determination of Pierre-Paul Riquet, the chief engineer. It is located in the commune of Nissan-lez-Ensérune near to the archaeological site Oppidum d'Ensérune.

There was great disappointment when the works reached the hill d'Ensérune. A few metres of digging in hard rock revealed a very brittle sandstone subject to slippage. Colbert, the prime minister, halted the works when he was made aware of the situation. The portal was blocked and the workings re-sited. Riquet's detractors took advantage of this situation to impede the project. Colbert announced that he would send royal commissioners to decide the canal's future. The advice of the Chevalier de Clerville, architect to Louis XIV, was to cross the river Aude rather than tunnel through the hill. Riquet, however, maintained his preference for a tunnel because of the extra problems that crossing the Aude would create.

Riquet's response was to ask his master mason, Pascal de Nissan, to continue tunneling in secret despite the risk of collapse. In less than eight days, the tunnel was complete with a concrete ceiling throughout. The tunnel is 165 metres (541 ft) long with an arch 8 metres (26 ft) above the canal's surface, and removed the necessity for an extra lock.

By the time the Malpas Tunnel was excavated in the seventeenth century, the hill had already for several centuries been the site of a tunnel, dug in the Middle Ages, to drain the Étang de Montady. This pre-existing tunnel is said to have been Riquet's inspiration for the Malpas Tunnel. In the nineteenth century, a third tunnel was excavated, passing through the Hill d'Ensérune beneath the Malpas tunnel to house the Béziers to Narbonne railway line.

== See also ==
- Rove Tunnel
- Régismont-le-Haut
