= Étang de Montady =

Drained wetland and agricultural landscape in France

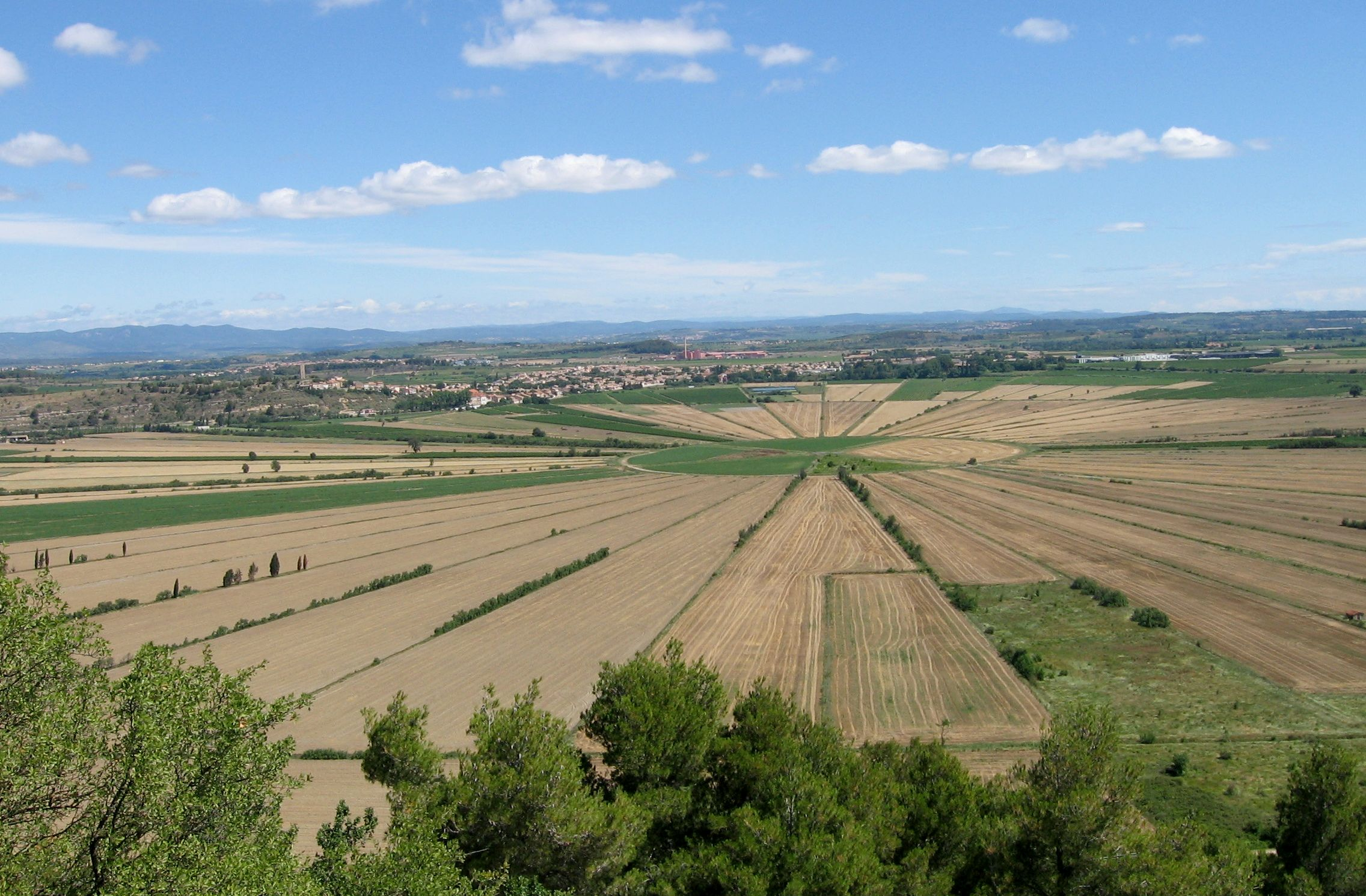
Étang de Montady 43°19′12″N 3°07′24″E

The Étang de Montady (English: "pond of Montady") is a drained endoreic pond or lagoon, is now more accurately a former freshwater wetland, located near Montady and Colombiers, midway between Béziers and Narbonne in the western department of Hérault in southern France.

== History ==
Popularly believed to have been "constructed by the Visigoths", the Étang de Montady was in fact built by monks and wealthy Béziers landowners during the second half of the 13th century after a 1247 authorization by the Archbishop of Narbonne. The exact dates when the work began or ended are not clear, but the landscape as it exists today was completed by 1268.

The Étang de Montady was drained to provide much-needed farmland for the Kingdom of France, which was then experiencing a population boom. This agricultural landscape exists today and can be seen from the Oppidum d'Ensérune, a nearby hill and historic settlement.

== Design and construction ==
The area was drained by making radial ditches from a single center point out to the extremities. The water flows to this center point and is then drained by sixteen vertical shafts located approximately 275 feet (84 m) apart from each other to an underground culvert which flows through the Malpas hill and under the Malpas Tunnel of the Canal du Midi. The resulting agricultural plots are triangular due to the radial lines extending from the center. The original hydraulic infrastructure used to drain the Étang is similar in design and construction to Arabic qanat, and may therefore trace its lineage to Al-Andalus or North Africa. It is also comparable to hydraulic engineering works designed and built by the Etruscans and Romans and used throughout the Mediterranean basin during antiquity, including at Albano and Fucino in Italy, at Faiyum in Egypt, and at Copais and Trichonida in Greece.

The fact that the drain for Montady went through Malpas convinced Pierre-Paul Riquet—designer of the Canal du Midi—that he could build a tunnel through the same hill for his canal.
