= Delhommeau =

Delhommeau is a French surname. Notable people with the surname include:

- Marcel Delhommeau (born 1913–1993), French international rugby union and rugby
- Pascal Delhommeau (born 1978), French former professional footballer
- Charles Delhommeau (1883–1970), French sculptor
