= Joseph Thierry =

French lawyer and politician

Joseph Marie Philippe Thierry

Minister of Public Works
- In office 22 March 1913 – 2 December 1913
- Prime Minister: Louis Barthou
- Preceded by: Jean Dupuy
- Succeeded by: Fernand David

Minister of Finance
- In office 20 March 1917 – 7 September 1917
- Preceded by: Alexandre Ribot
- Succeeded by: Louis-Lucien Klotz

French Ambassador to Spain
- In office October 1917 – September 1918
- Preceded by: Léon Geoffray
- Succeeded by: Gabriel Alapetite

Personal details
- Born: 2 March 1857 Haguenau, Bas-Rhin, France
- Died: 22 September 1918 (aged 61) San Sebastián, Spain
- Occupation: Lawyer

Joseph Marie Philippe Thierry (2 March 1857 – 22 September 1918) was a French lawyer and politician. He was deputy for Bouches-du-Rhône from 1898 to 1918. He was Minister of Public Works in 1913 and Minister of Finance in 1917. As Minister of Finance he introduced reforms that made the newly introduced income tax more progressive.

== Life ==
=== Early years ===
Joseph Marie Philippe Thierry was born on 20 March 1857 in Haguenau, Bas-Rhin. He was the son of the last French mayor of Haguenau before the Franco-Prussian War of 1870. His family was expelled by the Germans and took refuge in Marseille, where Joseph Thierry began to study Law. He went on to the faculties of Law in Aix-en-Provence and Paris. He became an attorney in Marseille specializing in commercial and financial cases.

=== Deputy ===
Thierry was elected deputy for Bouches-du-Rhône representing the 3rd district of Marseille on 22 March 1898 in the first round. He was reelected in the first round in 1902, 1906, 1910 and 1914. In the Chamber he was particularly involved in economic issues. He was vice president of the Customs committee from 1902, and president of this committee from 1910 to 1913. He supported free trade. He was opposed to the bill separating the Church and State.

In 1903 Thierry was among a group of right-wing members of the Progressistes who formed the new Fédération républicaine (FR), a party of the center-right. Other founders included liberal opponents of the second empire and dedicated republicans such as Alexandre Ribot, Jules Méline, Henri Barboux and Édouard Aynard. The organization was militantly republican, but socially conservative. From 1906 to 1911, Thierry was president of the FR as successor to the founding president Eugène Motte.Thierry initiated annual party conferences, and managed to increase support for the FR in the provinces.In November 1910 he asked his party to accept the lay laws that Aristide Briand proposed under his "appeasement" policy. In December 1911, Thierry left the FR. Later he joined the Alliance démocratique (ARD). In 1914 Thierry joined the centrist Gauche démocratique parliamentary group.

The Méline tariff of 11 January 1892, named after its author Jules Méline, was a protectionist tariff that aimed to ensure that French colonies sold to France and bought from France rather than trading with other countries. It drew mounting criticism from colonial businessmen who thought it retarded economic growth. As rapporteur for the standing parliamentary commission on customs, in 1910 Thierry represented the views of the reformist Fédération Intercolonial to an inter-ministry committee that had been set up "to fix the basis for the establishment of a colonial customs regime more favorable to the economic development of our colonies." The committee submitted its report on 23 February 1910. The reformists had been ignored and the protectionist Méline tariff was reconfirmed.

=== Cabinet positions ===
Thierry was Minister of Public Works from 22 March 1913 to 2 December 1913 in the cabinet of Louis Barthou.As a Progressist he was attacked by the Radicals, who considered that he was a reactionary.In 1913, Thierry introduced a bill, which was passed, to allow airships to fly over private property. The landowner could no longer claim rights to the airspace, but could claim for any damages caused to the airship. Thierry said the purpose was "while protecting the public, not to injure in any way a new national industry."During World War I (1914–18) Aristide Briand appointed him Under-secretary of State for War responsible for military supplies from 1 July 1915 to 12 December 1916.On 7 May 1916, Thierry assisted Marcel Sembat, Minister of Public Works, in inaugurating the Rove Tunnel and the first two cranes of Port-de-Bouc.The tunnel was the most challenging section of the Canal de Marseille au Rhône, which would connect Marseille to the Rhône river.After many delays, the canal was finally opened to traffic in April 1927.

Thierry was Minister of Finance from 20 March 1917 to 7 September 1917 under Alexandre Ribot. Thierry was described as "the rare Third Republic politician who was qualified to deal with financial and commercial questions." He was Minister of Finance at a time when the offensive of General Robert Nivelle had failed and the war seemed to be in a stalemate. He continued the policies of his predecessor Alexandre Ribot, who had been promoted to president of the council. Thierry strengthened controls of foods, particularly wheat and sugar, made insurance against marine war risks compulsory, increased the salaries of civil servants due to the high cost of living, and prepared for the introduction of exchange controls.

Thierry accompanied Étienne Clémentel, Minister of Commerce, to the London Conference, where France negotiated an easing of prohibitions on foreign trade in the agreement of 6 July 1917. Thierry was named in the law of 31 July 1917, which continued the fiscal reform that was caused by the introduction of income tax. He prepared a budget for "ordinary" non-war government spending. The top marginal income tax rate was to increase from 10% to 12.5% and then to 20%. In addition, he introduced taxes on income from business (4.5%), agriculture (3.75%), employment (3.75%), professional fees (3.75%) and revenue from capital (4%). He also proposed a basic sales tax of 0.1% on all transactions, both wholesale and retail. In addition, there would be retail taxes of 5% on non-essential goods and 10% on luxury goods. By decree of 6 September 1917 Thierry created a supervisory committee for colonial banks.

=== Later career ===
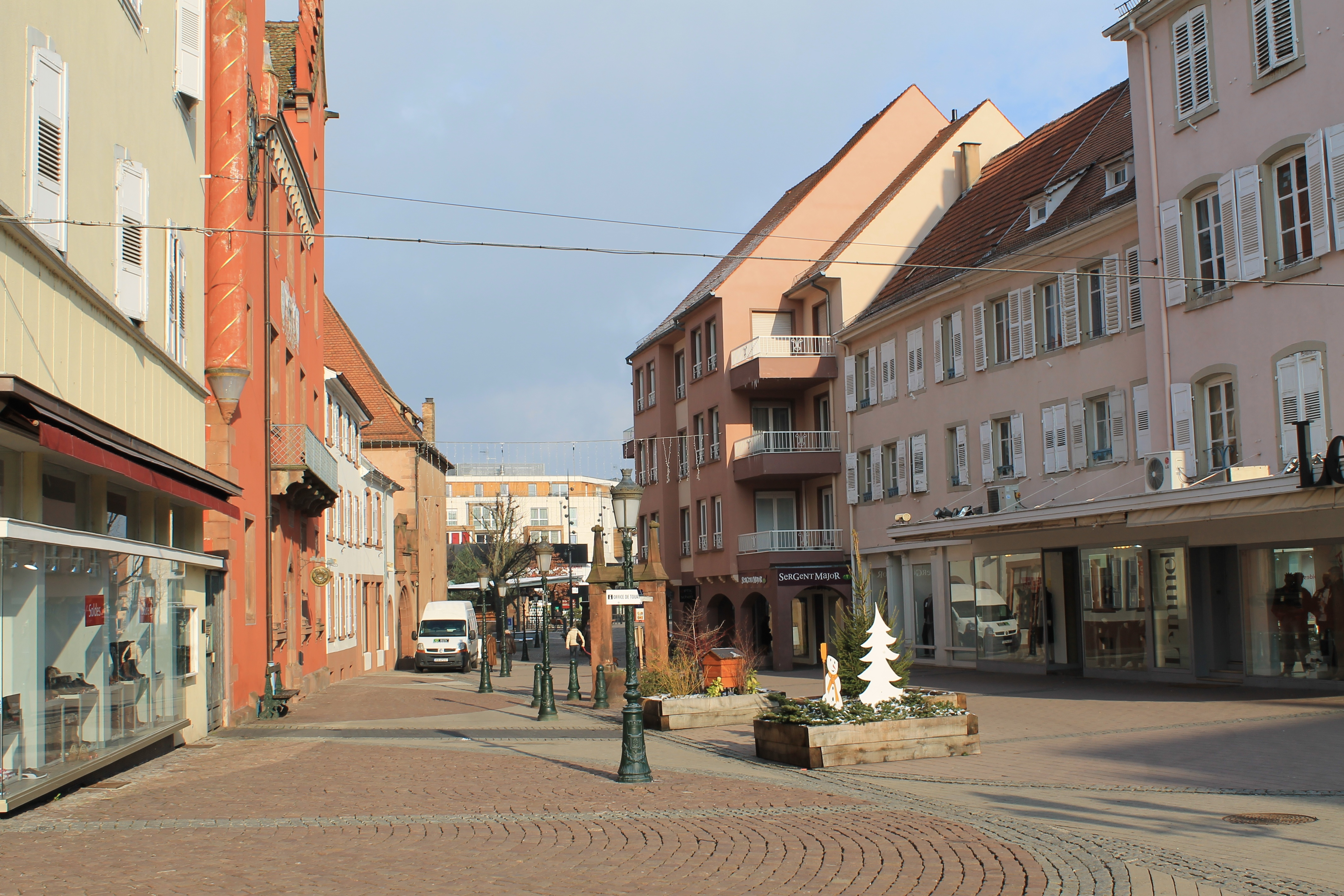
Rue Joseph Thierry in his birthplace, Haguenau

After leaving the government Thierry was appointed temporary Ambassador to Spain in place of Léon Geoffray, where he convinced the Spanish government to take a position of benevolent neutrality. Joseph Thierry died of a heart attack on 22 September 1918 in San Sebastián, Spain. His son, Adrien-Joseph Thierry (born 4 January 1884), was a lawyer who married Nadine de Rothschild, daughter of baron Henri de Rothschild. Adrien-Joseph Thierry became first secretary of the French embassy in London.

== Selected publications ==
- Joseph Thierry (1898), Université d'Aix-Marseille. Faculté de droit et des sciences économiques (ed.), Faculté marseillaise libre de droit, séance solennelle de rentrée du 5 novembre 1898. Discours de M. le député J. Thierry (in French), Marseille: impr. de Barlatier, p. 23
- Joseph Thierry (1899), France. Chambre des députés (ed.), Rapport fait, au nom de la Commission du budget, chargée d'examiner le projet de loi portant fixation du budget général de l'exercice 1899 (ministère du commerce, de l'industrie, des postes et des télégraphes; service du commerce et de l'industrie), par M. J. Thierry,... (in French), Chambre des députés. Septième législature. Session de 1899. N ° 610, Paris: Impr. de Motteroz, p. 145
- Joseph Thierry (1899), France. Chambre des députés (ed.), Rapport fait, au nom de la Commission du budget chargée d'examiner le projet de loi portant fixation du budget général de l'exercice 1900 (ministère du commerce, de l'industrie, des postes et des télégraphes) (service du commerce et de l'industrie) (in French), Chambre des députés. Septième législature. Session de 1899. N ° 1145, Paris: Impr. de Motteroz, p. 289
- Joseph Thierry (1900), France. Chambre des députés (ed.), Rapport fait, au nom de la Commission du budget de 1900, chargée d'examiner le projet de loi sur la marine marchande, par M. Thierry (Bouches-du-Rhône),... (6 novembre 1900.) (in French), Chambre des députés. 7e législature. Session extraordinaire de 1900. N ° 1893, Paris: Impr. de Motteroz, p. 100
- Joseph Thierry (1902), France. Chambre des députés (ed.), Rapport fait au nom de la commission du budget de 1900 chargée d'examiner le projet de loi adopté par la Chambre des députés, adopté avec modifications par le Sénat, sur la marine marchande... par M. J. Thierry (Bouches-du-Rhône)... (18 mars 1902) (in French), Chambre des députés. 7e législature. Session 1902. N ° 3112, Paris: Impr. de Motteroz, p. 31
- Joseph Thierry; Benjamin Vallotton (1917), Comité L'effort de la France et de ses alliés (ed.), L'effort alsacien-lorrain (in French), Paul Labbé, preface, Paris, Barcelona: Bloud et Gay, p. 31

== Sources ==
- Burnand, Robert (1924), Qui êtes-vous?: Annuaire des contemporains; notices biographiques, C. Delagrave
- Gordon, David M. (1996), Liberalism and Social Reform: Industrial Growth and Progressiste Politics in France, 1880-1914, Greenwood Publishing Group, ISBN 978-0-313-29811-0
- Irvine, William D. (Autumn 1974), "French Conservatives and the "New Right" during the 1930s", French Historical Studies, 8 (4), Duke University Press: 534–562, doi:10.2307/285852, JSTOR 285852
- Jolly, Jean (1960–1977). "Thierry (Joseph, Marie, Philippe)". Dictionnaire des parlementaires français; notices biographiques sur les ministres, députés et sénateurs français de 1889 à 1940 (in French). Paris: Presses universitaires de France. ISBN 2-1100-1998-0.
- Jome, Hiram L. (August 1928), "Property in the Air as Affected by the Airplane and the Radio", The Journal of Land & Public Utility Economics, 4 (3), University of Wisconsin Press: 257–272, doi:10.2307/3139144, JSTOR 3139144
- "Joseph THIERRY", CAEF (in French), archived from the original on 2016-03-29
- Lynch, Frances (2013-07-22), "The Haig-Shoup Mission to France in the 1920s", The Political Economy of Transnational Tax Reform: The Shoup Mission to Japan in Historical Context, Cambridge University Press, ISBN 978-1-107-35548-4
- Masson, Paul (15 May 1916), "Le Canal de Marseille Au Rhône", Annales de Géographie (in French), 25 (135), Armand Colin: 223–230, doi:10.3406/geo.1916.8812, JSTOR 23439616
- Passmore, Kevin (2013), The Right in France from the Third Republic to Vichy, OUP Oxford, ISBN 978-0-19-965820-6
- Persell, Stuart Michael (Spring 1981), "The Role of the Union Coloniale Française and the Fédération Intercoloniale in Colonial Tariff Reform, 1893-1925", Historical Reflections / Réflexions Historiques, 8 (1), Berghahn Books: 77–91, JSTOR 41298741
- "Science: Tunnel", Time, 2 May 1927
- Wright, Gordon (1939), Raymond Poincare and the French Presidency, Stanford University Press, ISBN 978-0-8047-3416-5
