= Montady =

- Commune
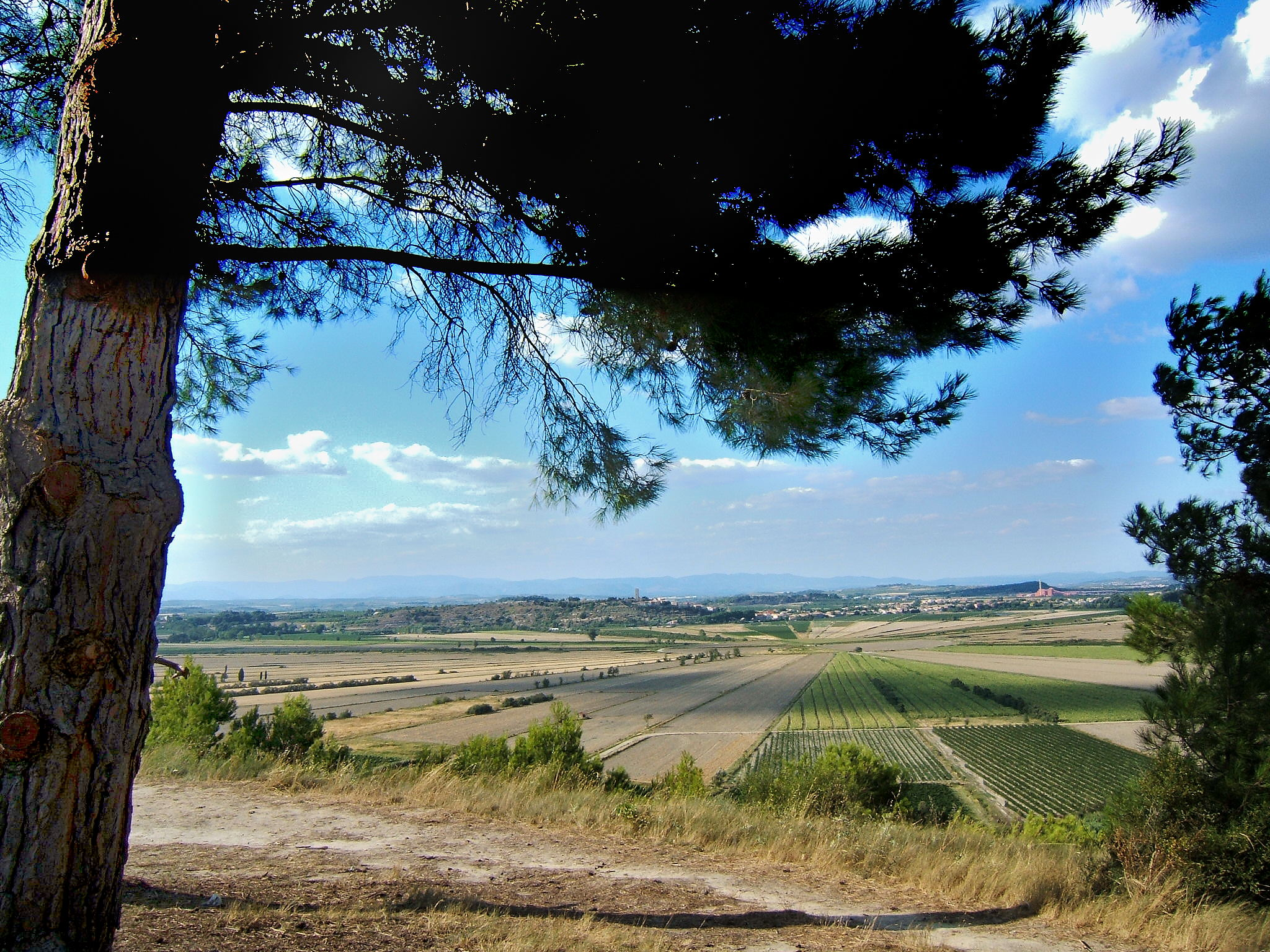
- Étang de Montady

- Coat of arms
- Location of Montady
- Location within France Location within Occitanie
- Coordinates: 43°19′53″N 3°07′18″E
- Country: France
- Region: Occitania
- Department: Hérault
- Arrondissement: Béziers
- Canton: Cazouls-lès-Béziers
- Intercommunality: Domitienne

Government
  - Mayor (2020–2026): Alain Castan
- Area^{1}: 9.95 km^{2} (3.84 sq mi)
- Elevation: 7 m (23 ft)
- Highest elevation: 113 m (371 ft)
- Lowest elevation: 10 m (33 ft)
- Population (2023): 3,990
  - Density: 401/km^{2} (1,040/sq mi)
- Time zone: UTC+01:00 (CET)
  - Summer (DST): UTC+02:00 (CEST)
- INSEE/Postal code: 34161 /34310
- ^{1} French Land Register data, which excludes lakes, ponds, glaciers > 1 km^{2} (0.386 sq mi or 247 acres) and river estuaries.

Montady (French pronunciation: [mɔ̃tadi]; Occitan: Montadin) is a commune in the Hérault department in the Occitanie region in southern France.

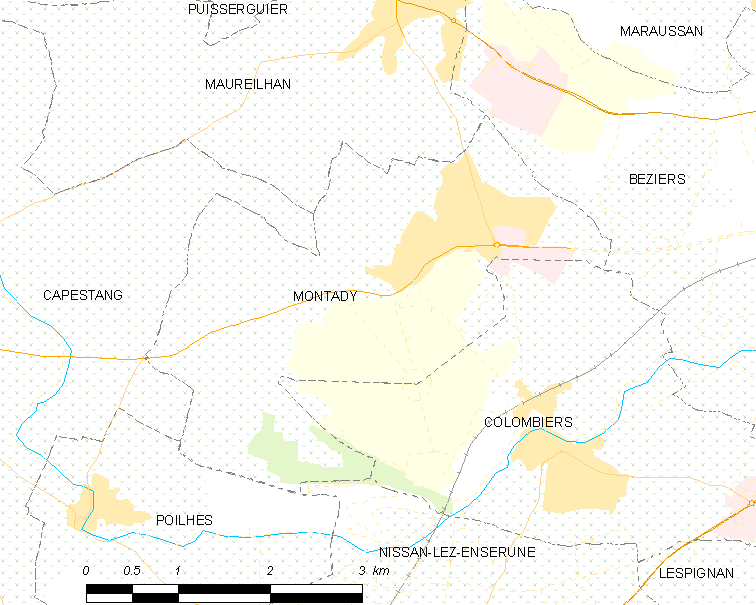
Map

== Population ==
Historical population

Year	Pop.	±% p.a.
1793	163	—
1821	205	+0.82%
1846	320	+1.80%
1872	384	+0.70%
1901	703	+2.11%
1926	700	−0.02%
1946	610	−0.69%
1962	695	+0.82%
1968	911	+4.61%

Year	Pop.	±% p.a.
1975	1,310	+5.33%
1982	1,635	+3.22%
1990	2,070	+2.99%
1999	2,533	+2.27%
2007	3,773	+5.11%
2012	3,990	+1.12%
2017	3,935	−0.28%
2023	3,990	+0.23%

Source: EHESS and INSEE (1968-2023)

== See also ==
- Communes of the Hérault department
- Étang de Montady
- Régismont-le-Haut
