= Étang de Berre =

French lagoon on the Mediterranean coast

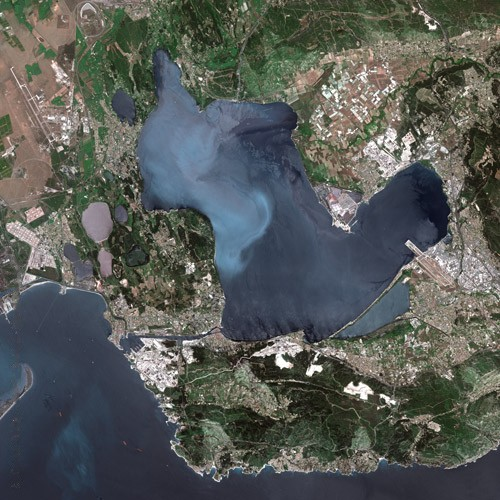

- Location within Provence-Alpes-Côte d'Azur
- Location: France
- Coordinates: 43°26′45″N 5°06′50″E
- Primary inflows: Arc, Touloubre, Cadière, canal de la Durance
- Primary outflows: canal de Caronte, canal du Rove
- Catchment area: 1,700 km^{2} (660 sq mi) (natural)
- Basin countries: France
- Surface area: 155.3 km^{2} (60.0 sq mi)
- Water volume: 900 million cubic metres (730,000 acre⋅ft)
- Surface elevation: 0.4 m (1 ft 4 in)

The Étang de Berre ([e.tɑ̃ də bɛʁ], "Lagoon of Berre"; in Provençal Occitan: estanh de Bèrra / mar de Bèrra according to classical orthography, estang de Berro / mar de Berro according to Mistralian orthography) is a brackish water lagoon on the Mediterranean coast of France, about 25 kilometres (16 mi) north-west of Marseille.

== Geography ==
The lagoon covers an area of 155.3 km^{2} (60.0 sq mi). Created by the rise in water levels at the end of the Last Glacial Period (colloquially known as the last ice age), this small inland sea is composed of three parts: the principal body of water, the Étang de Vaïne to the east and the Étang de Bolmon to the south-east.

The Étang de Berre is fed with fresh water by the rivers Arc, Touloubre and Cadière and – since 1966 – by Électricité de France's Canal EDF de la Durance. Two canals link it to the Mediterranean, the open air Canal de Caronte leading towards Port-de-Bouc and the Canal de Marseille au Rhône which leads towards L'Estaque through the Rove Tunnel; the Rove Tunnel has been closed since 1963, after a section of the tunnel collapsed.

The Marseille Provence Airport is located in the southeast portion of the Étang de Berre, with its main runway extending into the water on reclaimed land.

== Administration ==
Ten communes border the Étang de Berre: Istres, Miramas, Saint-Chamas, Berre-l'Étang, Rognac, Vitrolles, Marignane, Châteauneuf-les-Martigues, Martigues and Saint-Mitre-les-Remparts.

== History ==
The ancient name of the Étang de Berre was Stagnum Mastromela, according to Pliny the Elder (Book III [34]).
