= Marseille-Rhône Canal =

Canal in France

Canal de Marseille au Rhône
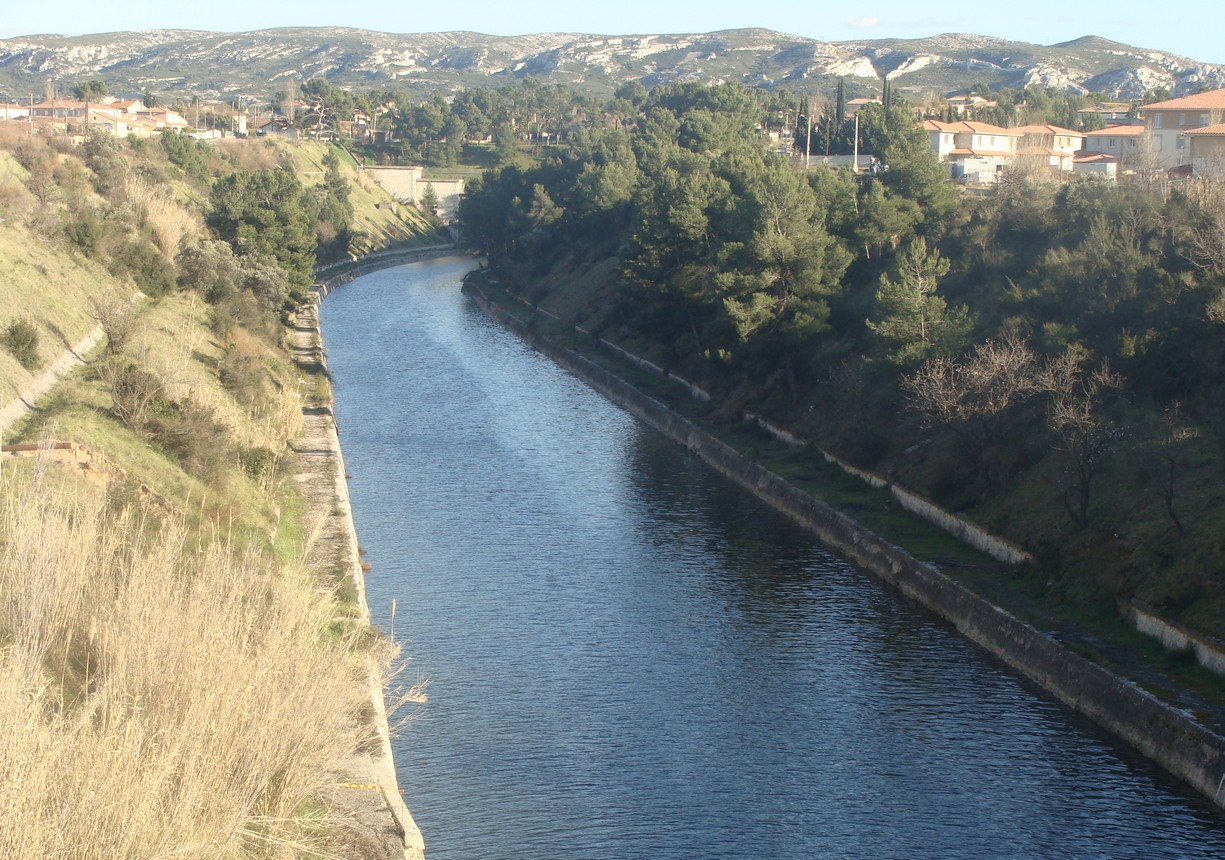
- Marignane section looking southeast to chaîne de l'Estaque

Specifications
- Length: 81 kilometres (50 mi)
- Status: Closed since 1963

Geography
- Direction: Northwest
- Start point: Marseille
- End point: Arles
- Beginning coordinates: 43.359717°N 5.293758°E
- Connects to: Mediterranean Sea, Rhône

The Canal de Marseille au Rhône connects the Mediterranean Sea at Marseille to the Rhône at Arles. The section between Marignane and Marseille has been closed since the collapse of the Rove Tunnel in 1963.

== Description ==
The canal has a total length of 81 kilometres (50 mi) from Marseille to Arles. The canal consists of the Rove Tunnel from the harbor on the Mediterranean, the section leading to the Étang de Berre, the Bouc à Martigues canal (or Caronte canal), the Rhône à Fos canal and the Saint-Louis canal. There are two channels at Martigues, the Gallifet canal and the Baussengue canal, used only for recreational boats. Martigues island, between the two canals, is divided by the small canal of Saint-Sébastien, which runs along its length. The complex of waterways at Martigues has led to its being called the "Venice of Provence".

== History ==
The possibility of building a canal with a tunnel through the chaîne de l'Estaque to the northwest of Marseille had been discussed for many years. A proposal was developed for the Marseille Chamber of Commerce in 1879 by the engineer Guérard, but no action was taken until an act of 24 December 1903 authorized the project. The initial plan was for an 18 metres (59 ft) wide tunnel, which would only allow one-way traffic at any time, but this was later increased to 22 metres (72 ft) for two-way traffic despite the increase in cost. Preparatory work began in 1906. On 7 May 1916 Marcel Sembat, Minister of Public Works, and Joseph Thierry, Under-secretary of State for War, inaugurated the Rove Tunnel and the first two cranes of Port-de-Bouc. After many delays, the full canal was finally opened to traffic in April 1927. It was closed in 1963 after a section of the tunnel collapsed.

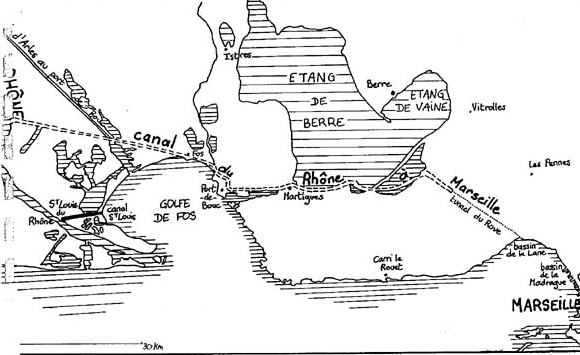
1895 plan

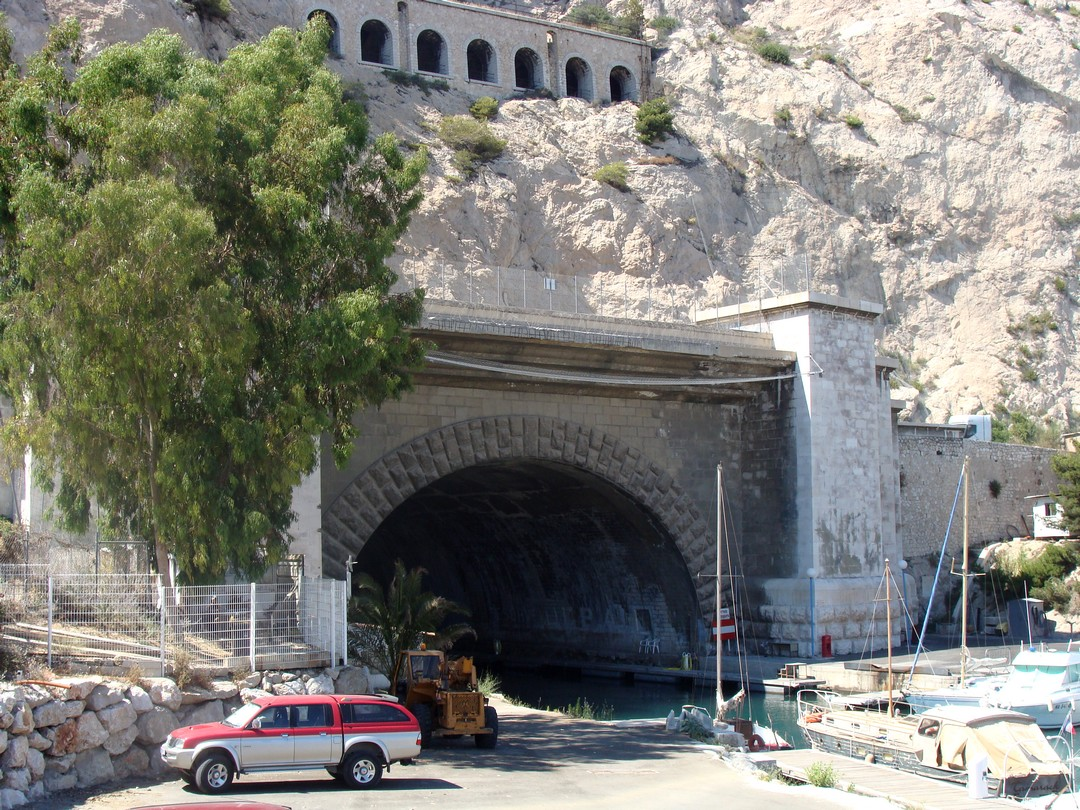
Southern portal of the Rove Tunnel

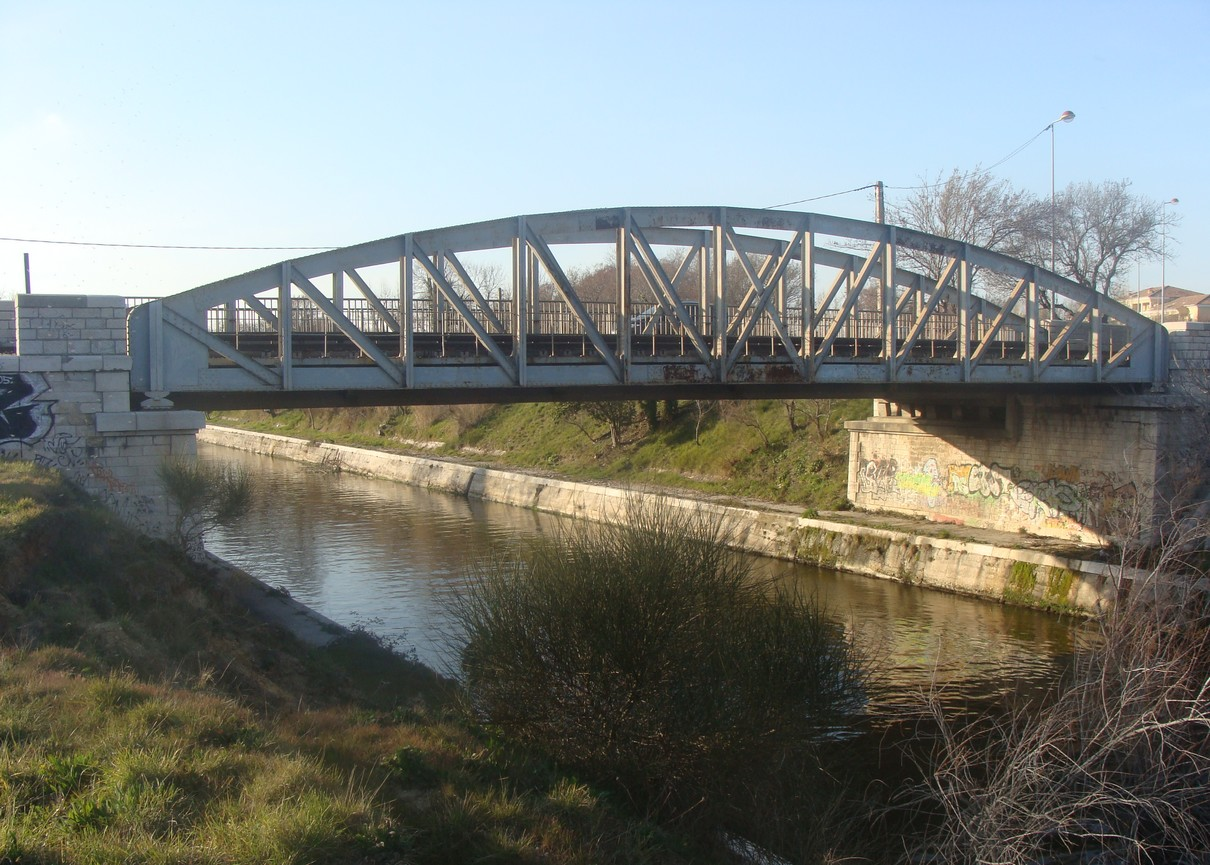
Railway bridge at Marignane

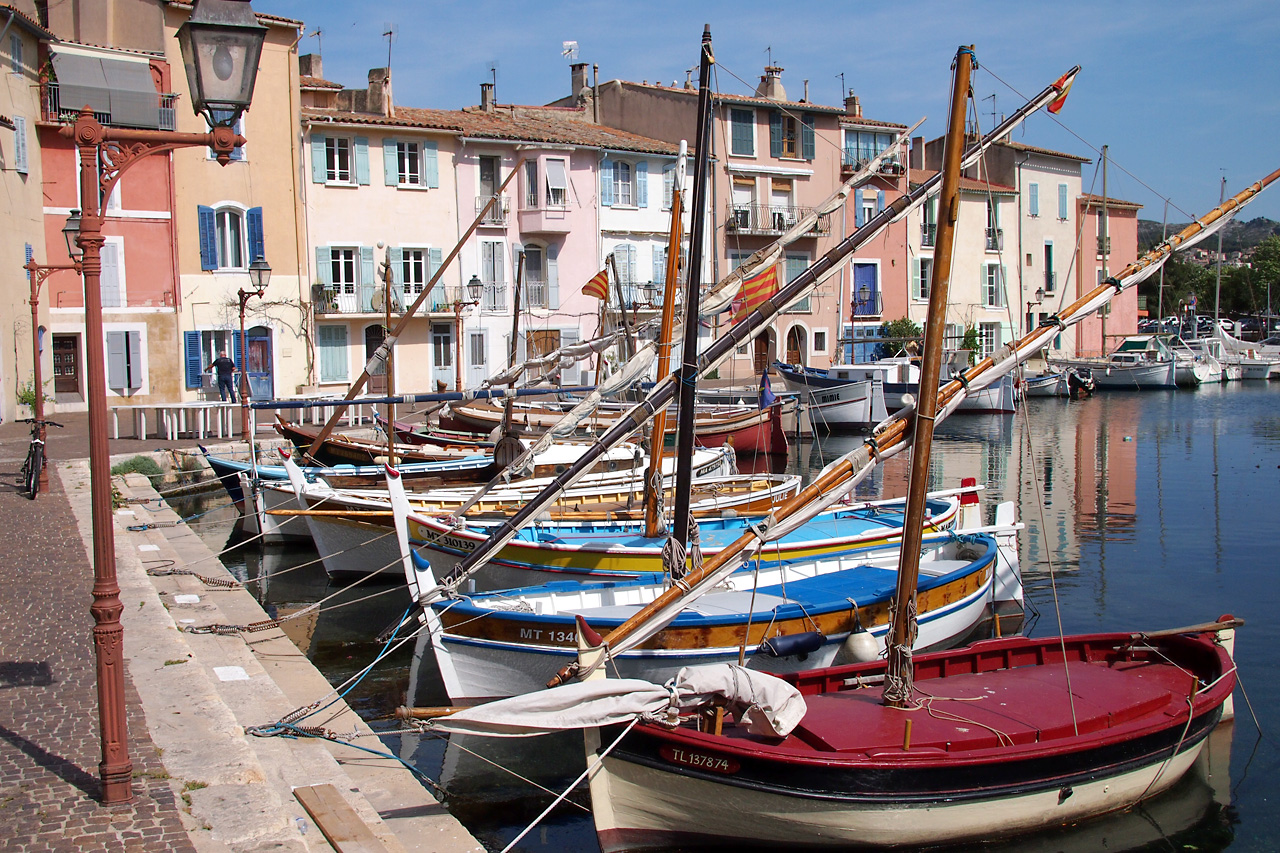
Martigues

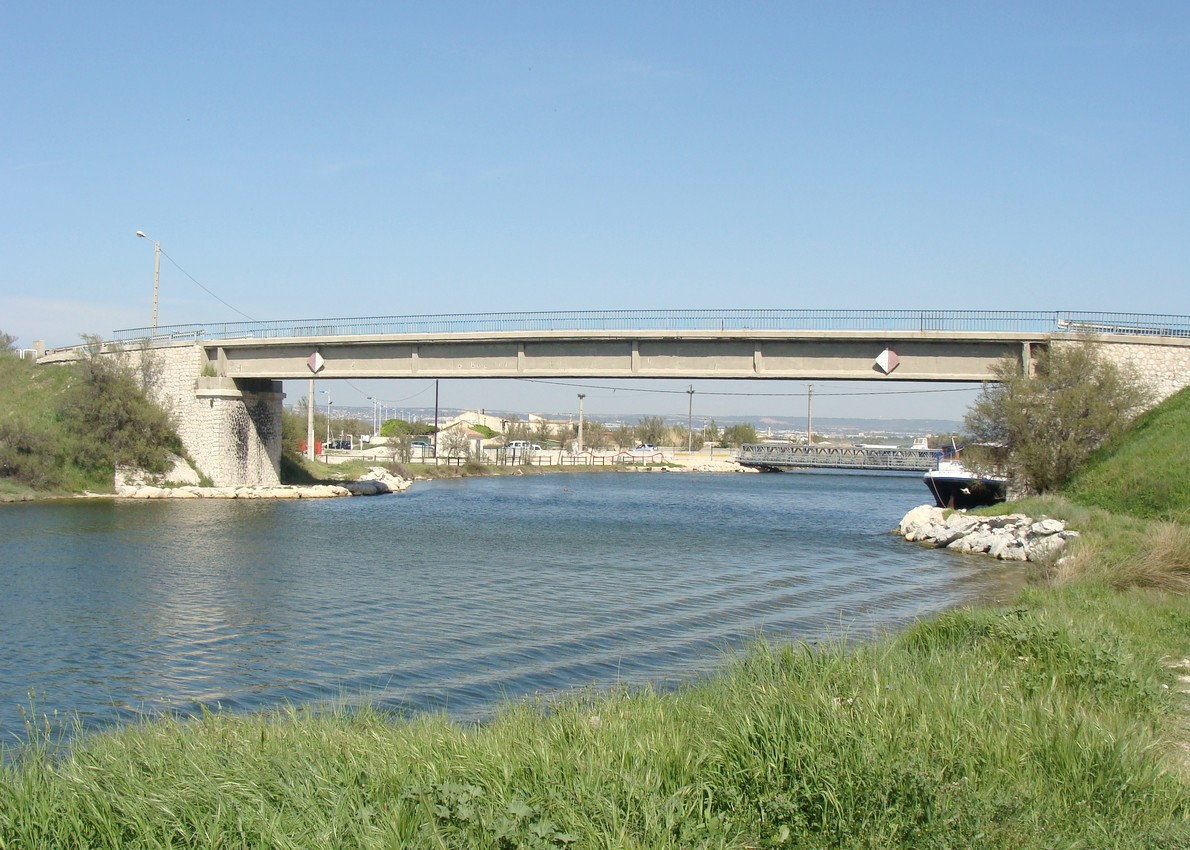
Pont du Jaï at la Palunette

== See also ==
- List of canals in France

== Sources ==
- "Canal de Marseille au Rhône", Histoire & Patrimoine des Rivières & Canaux (in French)
- Masson, Paul (15 May 1916), "LE CANAL DE MARSEILLE AU RHÔNE", Annales de Géographie, 25e Année (in French) (135), Armand Colin, JSTOR 23439616
- McKnight, Hugh (2013-08-01), Cruising French Waterways, Bloomsbury Publishing, ISBN 978-1-4081-9796-7
- "Science: Tunnel", Time, 2 May 1927
