= Marcel Delhommeau =

France international dual-code rugby player

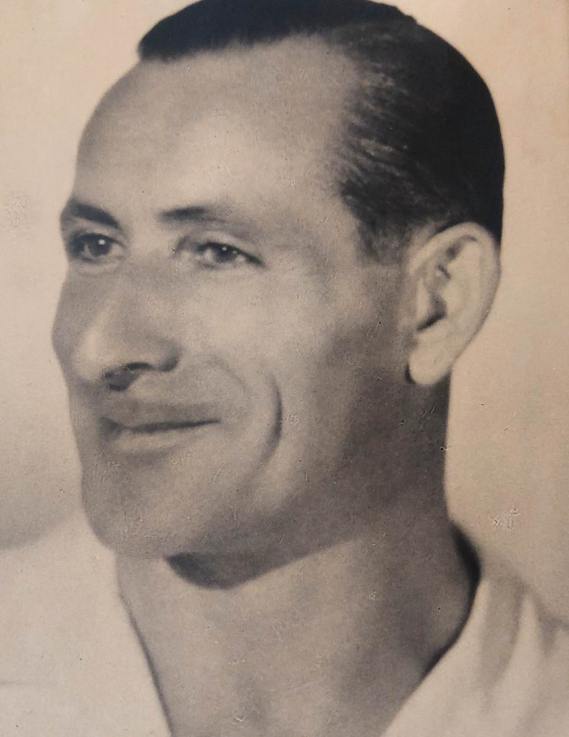

Personal information
- Full name: Marcel Eugène Bernard Delhommeau
- Born: 26 April 1913 Nissan-lez-Enserune, Hérault, France
- Died: 8 June 1993 (aged 80) Montpellier, France

Playing information
- Position: wing
Club
Years	Team	Pld	T	G	FG	P
1936–39	SA Villeneuve
Representative
Years	Team	Pld	T	G	FG	P
1938	France	1
- Military career
- Allegiance: Free France
- Branch: Free French Army
- Service years: 1940-41
- Unit: 81st Infantry Regiment
- Conflicts: World War II

Marcel Delhommeau (born April 26, 1913, in Nissan-lez-Enserune and died June 8, 1993, in Montpellier) was a French international rugby union and rugby league player who played as a winger in both codes during the 1930s.

He began playing rugby union and competed in the championships of Hérault and Languedoc for various regional clubs, including SNC Biterrois and Stade Piscenois. In 1936, while studying law in Toulouse, he switched to rugby league and joined SA Villeneuve. Quickly recognized as one of the best wingers in France, he won the Coupe de France in 1937 and participated in the runner-up finals of the Championship in 1938 and 1939, as well as the Coupe de France final in 1938. His outstanding performances led to his selection for a match against Wales on April 2, 1938, as part of the 1938 European Cup. With the outbreak of World War II in 1939, his sporting career came to an end.

== Biography ==
=== Youth and marriage ===
Marcel Eugène Bernard Delhommeau was born on April 26, 1913, in Nissan-lez-Enserune (Hérault) at his parents' home. His father, Jean Marius Édouard Delhommeau (1881-1916), was a hairdresser born in Nissan-lez-Enserune, and his mother, Flore Élise Fauré, was born in Monforte de Lemos, Spain. Delhommeau had two sisters: Raymonde (1909-1998) and Marie (1915–1980). His father died during World War I at the age of 34 on August 19, 1916, in Sète, drowning while rescuing a girl, while serving in the 16th section of military nurses (SIM) as a second-class soldier. Marcel Delhommeau was subsequently adopted by the nation by judgment of the civil court of Béziers dated June 5, 1919. He married Anne Marie Léone Delhommeau (1921-2014) on October 29, 1942.

=== Renowned winger in the Languedoc Championship in rugby union ===
Marcel Delhommeau played rugby union in the 1930s around his birthplace. He played for his hometown club, US Nissan, before moving on to play for SNC Biterrois. He was a renowned winger and had selections for the Languedoc rugby union team.

=== Switch to rugby league and SA Villeneuve in 1936 ===
Marcel Delhommeau decided during the summer of 1936 to switch to rugby league by signing for SA Villeneuve. He was 23 years old at the time. Previously selected for the Languedoc rugby union team, he had a solid reputation as a winger with his club, Stade piscenois. His move to Villeneuve-sur-Lot was related to his studies for a science degree in Toulouse. Initially planned for October 4, 1936, his first match in the French rugby league championship took place at the end of October due to the difficulty of balancing sports and studies at the faculty of sciences. He quickly established himself as one of the best wingers in France and improved week by week during the 1936-1937 season, although he was sidelined due to whooping cough, depriving him of the Coupe de France final at the end of the season. Villeneuve finished a modest 7th place in the championship that season. However, they won the Coupe de France, defeating XIII Catalan 12-6.

=== 1937–1938: Continued play and international debut ===
The 1937-1938 season was a hopeful new start for Villeneuve with a complete squad. Delhommeau remained a regular starter on the wing and was often cited as one of the best players in the matches he played by the press, which praised his "certain qualities". He faced the great Australian team managed by Harry Sunderland during the season, where Villeneuve was defeated 3-26. Despite the heavy defeat, Delhommeau was considered one of his team's best representatives. His performances in the Championship allowed him to be considered for the French national team against England in the European Nations Cup on March 20, 1938. Although he was initially in contention with Raphaël Saris and Alexandre Salat, the latter was eventually selected. However, Delhommeau made his debut in the international match against Wales on April 2, 1938, replacing Salat. Despite a severe defeat of 2-18, it was Delhommeau's only international appearance. At the end of the season with SA Villeneuve, he played in two finals, losing both the Coupe de France (12-36 against Racing Club de Roanne) and the Championship (3-8 against Racing Club albigeois).

=== Final season in XIII before the outbreak of World War II ===
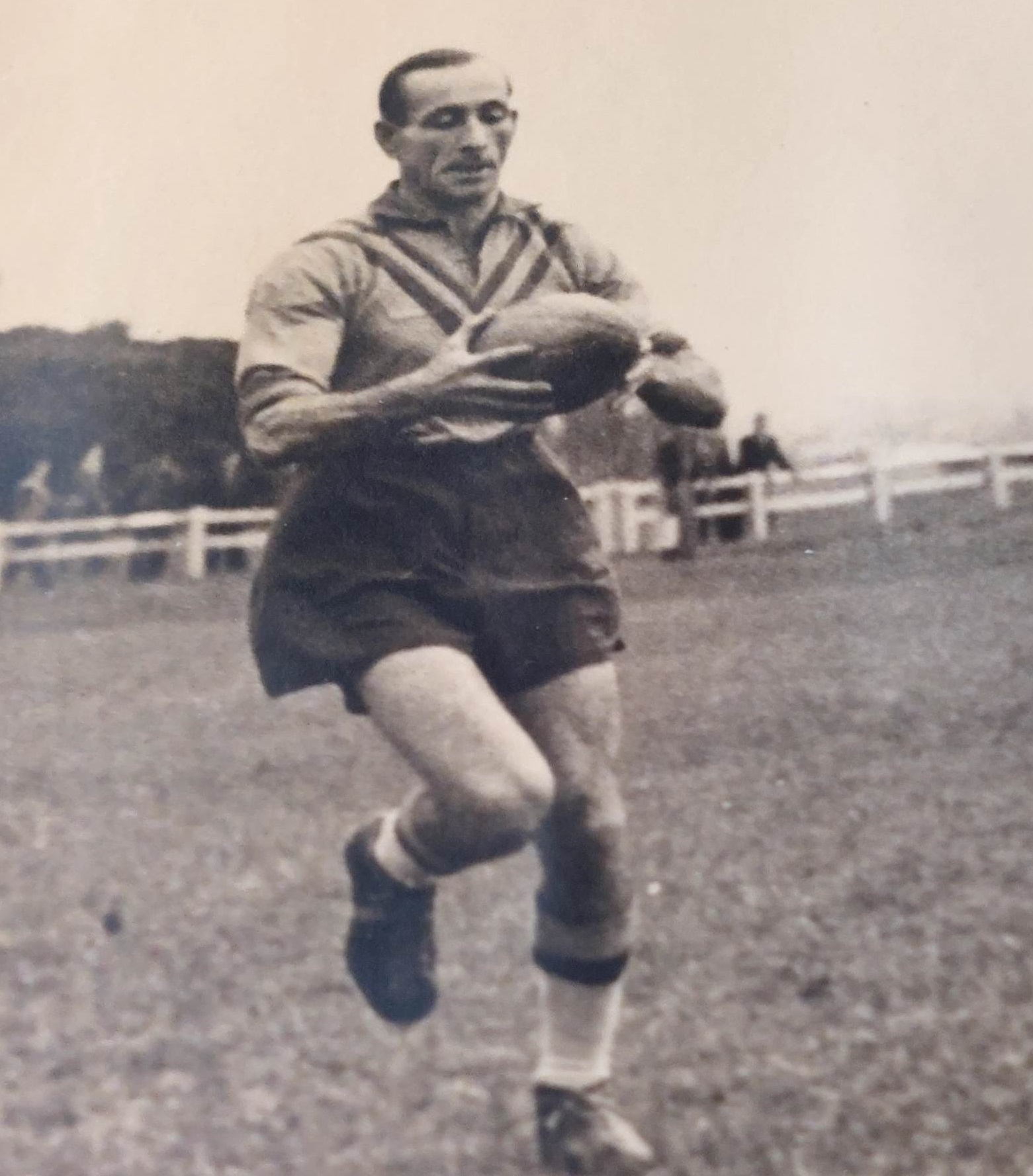
Marcel Delhommeau with the ball in hand

In the 1938-1939 season, Delhommeau requested a transfer to Toulouse Olympique XIII to avoid the long journeys between his studies in Toulouse and Villeneuve-sur-Lot. However, his military obligations forced him to return to Montpellier. Allowed by Villeneuve to sign for a club near his home, Delhommeau chose to stay with SA Villeneuve. He remained a regular starter on the wing throughout the season, playing in the Championship, where Villeneuve was a strong contender for the title. In the semi-final, Villeneuve defeated XIII Catalan 20-9, with Delhommeau scoring a try, but lost the final 0-9 to RC Roanne in front of nearly 20,000 spectators. Despite planning to continue for another season at Villeneuve, it was his last chance to win the Championship, as World War II was about to begin, leading to the suspension of the Championship and the call-up of many players to the military, effectively ending their sporting careers. Delhommeau, a corporal in the 81st Infantry Regiment, was taken prisoner of war in 1941 and detained at Stalag VI-H.

== Honors ==
The following honors are for his rugby league career. He is not known to have won any major titles in amateur rugby union, except for selections in the Languedoc team.

=== Rugby league ===
- Team
  - Winner of the Coupe de France: 1937 (Villeneuve-sur-Lot).
  - Runner-up in the French Championship: 1938 and 1939 (Villeneuve-sur-Lot).
  - Runner-up in the Coupe de France: 1938 (Villeneuve-sur-Lot).

==== European Nations Cup ====
Marcel Delhommeau's journey in the European Nations Cup
Edition	Rank	Results for France	Results for Delhommeau	Matches Played by Delhommeau
1938	3	0 wins, 0 draws, 2 losses	0 wins, 0 draws, 1 loss	Semi-finals

==== Details in selection ====
International Matches of Marcel Delhommeau
	Date	Opponent	Result	Competition	Position	Points	Tries	Penalties	Drop Goals
Under the colors of France
1	2 April 1938	Wales	2-18	European Cup					

==== Club statistics ====
Season	Championship		Cup							
Season	Competition	Position	Competition	Position	Competition	Matches	Points	Tries	Goals	Drop Goals
1936-37	Villeneuve XIII RLLG	7th	French Cup	Winner						
1937-38	Villeneuve XIII RLLG	Finalist	French Cup	Finalist	EC	1	0	0	0	0
1938-39	Villeneuve XIII RLLG	Finalist	French Cup	Quarterfinals						
