= Canal tunnel =

Tunnel for a canal

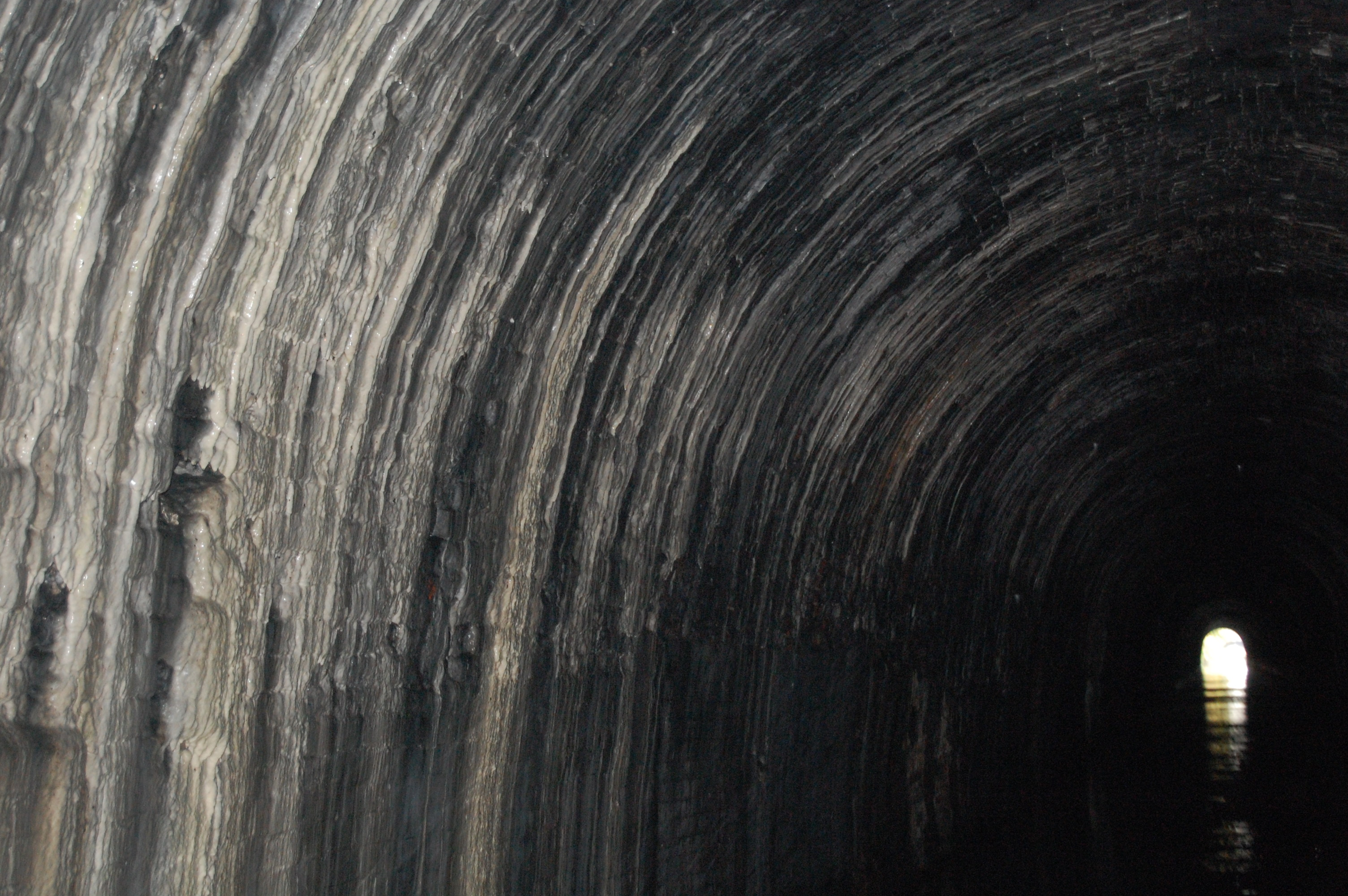
Shrewley Tunnel

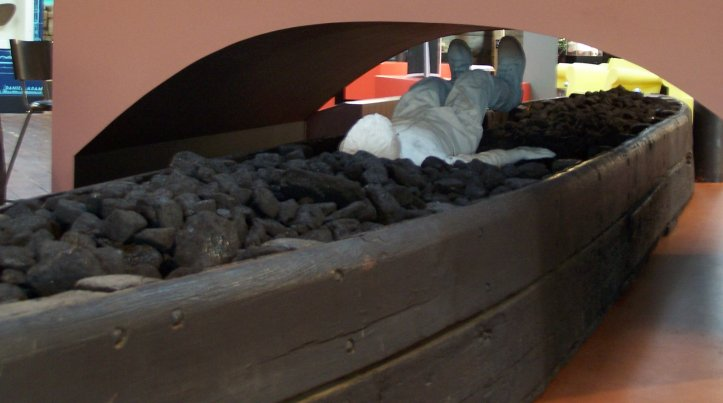
Starvationer at Ellesmere Port Canal Museum with a demonstration of the process of legging to push the boat through the tunnels

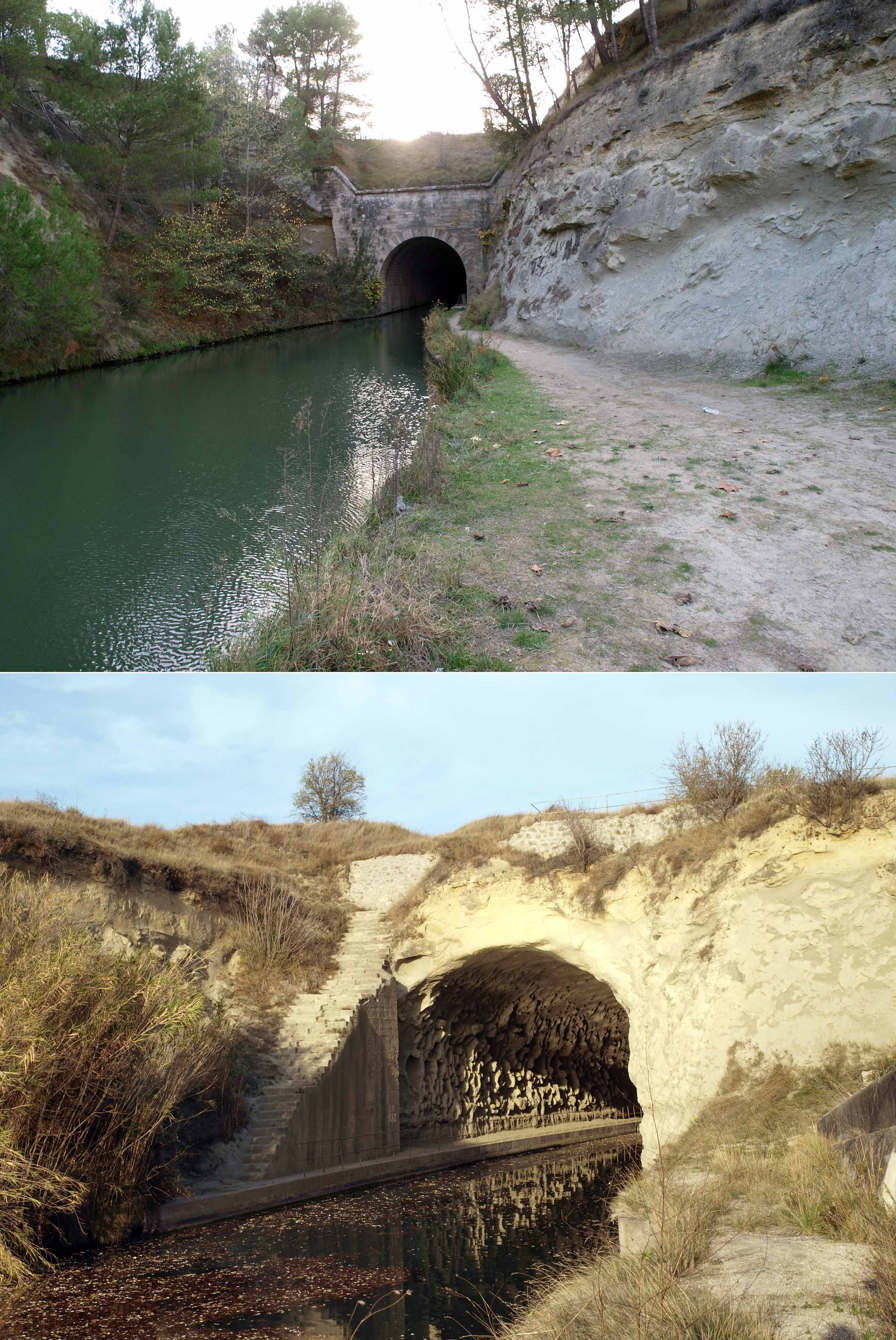
The Malpas Tunnel on the Canal du Midi

A canal tunnel is a tunnel for a canal. The building of a canal tunnel is crucial to help a waterway that is normally used for shipping cross a difficult section of terrain. They are also constructed to reduce the dependency on canal locks.

The longest canal tunnel in the world is the Rove Tunnel in France, currently disused. Other notable examples of canal tunnels include the proposed Stad Ship Tunnel in Norway, a proposed tunnel for sea going vessels, Standedge Tunnel, the longest, deepest and highest in the United Kingdom and Harecastle Tunnel, another noteworthy tunnel in the UK.

The oldest canal tunnel in the world is the Malpas Tunnel also in France, built in 1679.

In some canal tunnels the towpath continues through the tunnel. In other cases, especially on English narrow canals, there is no towpath. The horse would be led over the hill and the boat would be propelled by legging.

The term "canal tunnel" is not commonly applied to tunnels used to conduct water (for irrigation, water supply, etc.), such as the 48-kilometre-long Arpa-Sevan tunnel in Armenia (see List of longest tunnels), or a number of tunnels on the Irtysh–Karamay–Ürümqi Canal in China. For those, the term water tunnel is more commonly used.

Canal tunnels were made in the Kingdom of Travancore as early as 1876.

== See also ==
- List of canal tunnels in the United Kingdom

== Sources ==
- Rove Tunnel at Wikimapia
- Canal du Midi
- Chilakkur Thurappu
- Standedge Tunnel
