= Rove Tunnel =

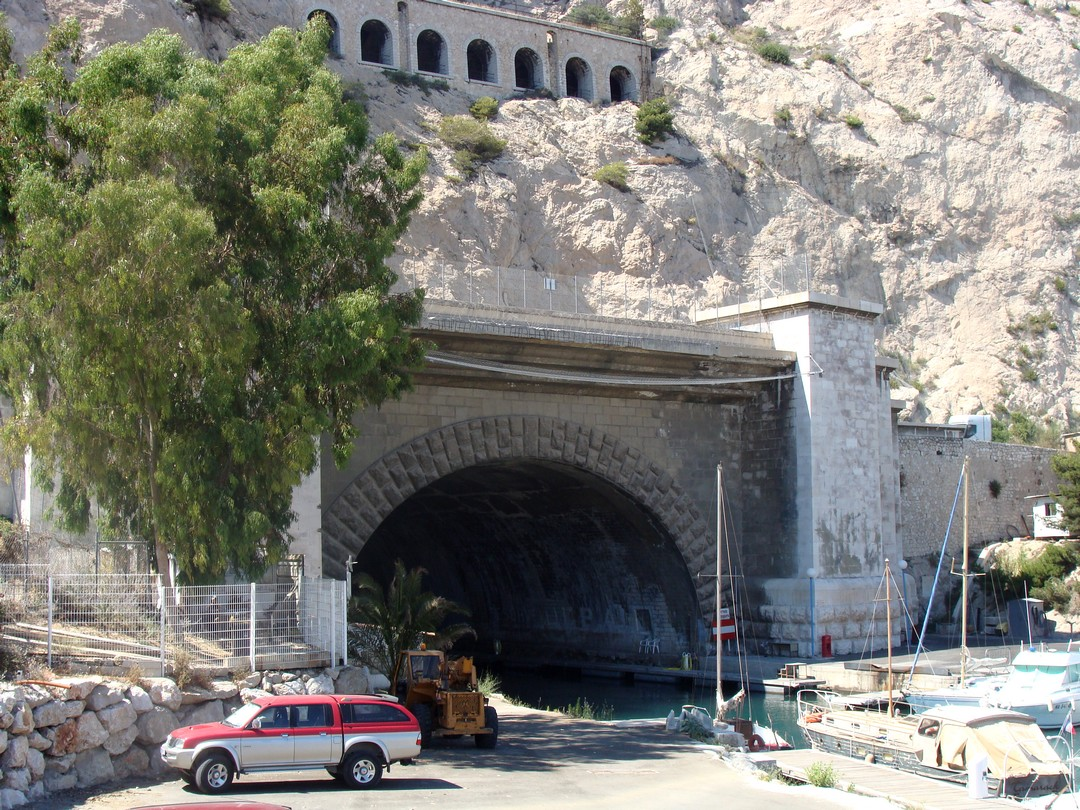
- The southeastern portal in Marseille

Overview
- Location: Marseille area
- Coordinates: South portal: 43.359642°N 5.293919°E; North portal 43.399599°N 5.224739°E
- Status: Closed
- Start: L'Estaque (southeast)
- End: Étang de Berre (northwest)

Operation
- Opened: 25 April 1927
- Character: Canal tunnel

Technical
- Length: 7,120 metres (23,360 ft) long
- Tunnel clearance: 15 m (49 ft)
- Width: 22 m (72 ft)

The Rove Tunnel (French: Tunnel du Rove) is a currently out-of-use canal tunnel in Southern France that connected the 16th arrondissement of Marseille to the Étang de Berre in the Bouches-du-Rhône department from 1927 to 1963. It allowed for waterway transport avoiding the Mediterranean Sea towards the Rhône within the larger Canal de Marseille au Rhône. With a length of 7,120 metres (23,360 ft) it was a major work of civil engineering; it remains the longest canal tunnel in the world.

== Description ==
The tunnel was the most challenging section of the Canal de Marseille au Rhône, which connected Marseille to the Rhône river. The canal has a total length of 81 kilometres (50 mi).

The tunnel starts near the village of Le Rove; it provides a sea level passage through the 278 m (912 ft) maximum altitude Chaîne de l'Estaque. The tunnel is 7,120 m (23,360 ft) long, 22 m (72 ft) wide and 11.4 m (37 ft) high. The water depth is 4 m (13 ft). It remains the biggest canal tunnel in the world, as far as shipping canals are concerned. As a part of the Canal de Marseille au Rhône, it used to connect the Étang de Berre in the north with L'Estaque in the south, both hosting a part of Marseille's industrial harbour.

== History ==
The possibility of building a canal tunnel had been discussed for many years. A proposal was developed for the Marseille Chamber of Commerce in 1879 by the engineer Guérard, but no action was taken until an act of 24 December 1903 authorised the project. The initial plan was for an 18 metres (59 ft) wide tunnel, which would only allow one-way traffic at any time, but this was later increased to 22 metres (72 ft) for two-way traffic despite the increase in cost. Preparatory work began in 1906.

Underground work began in 1910, using compressed air hammers to break through the rock. The contractor simultaneously worked from the south and from the north, and on a ventilation tunnel. Geological studies had not indicated any aquifer, but in fact the work was seriously affected by various irruptions of water. Work accelerated after the declaration of World War I on 1 August 1914. The labourers included Spanish and Portuguese nationals, who replaced Italians recalled to their country at the outbreak of war, as well as German prisoners of war.

On 19 February 1916 the central plug separating the north and south sections at 4,710 metres (15,450 ft) from the south portal was removed by dynamite. On 7 May 1916 Marcel Sembat, Minister of Public Works, accompanied by Joseph Thierry, Undersecretary of State for War, inaugurated the Rove Tunnel and the first two cranes of Port-de-Bouc. After many delays, the full canal was finally opened to traffic on 25 April 1927. Water had been flowing through it since 1925.

It was closed in 1963 after a section of the tunnel collapsed.

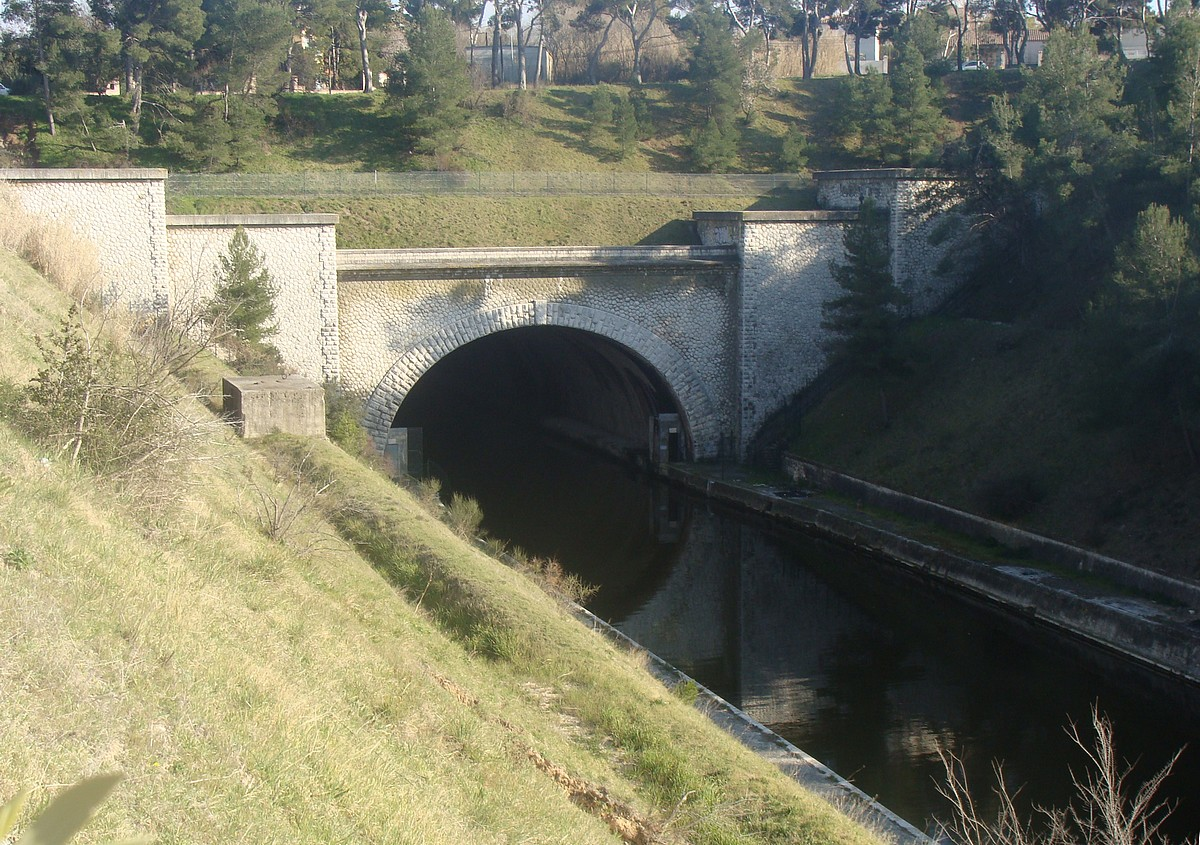
Northern entrance (2010)

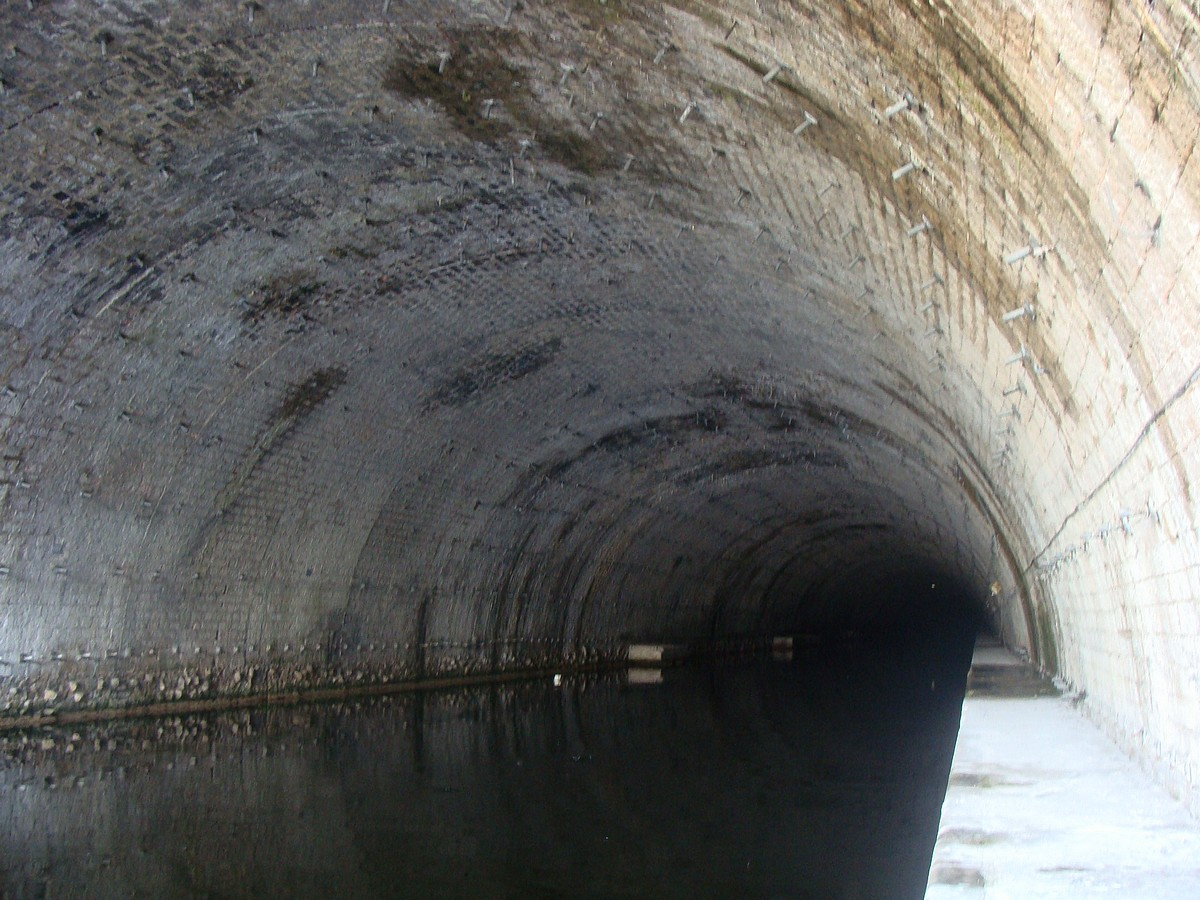
Gallery on the Marignane side (2010)

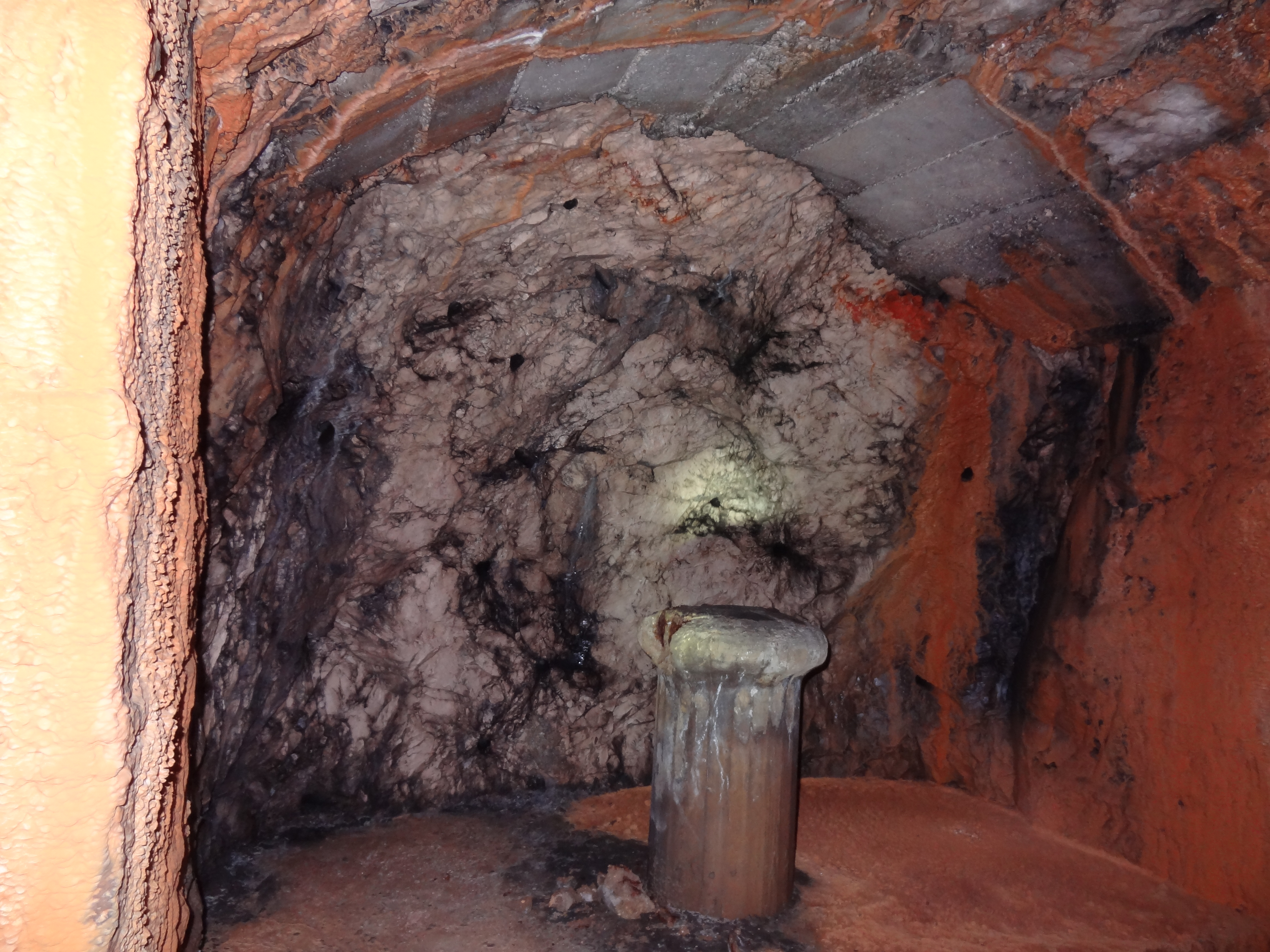
Mooring niche (2013)

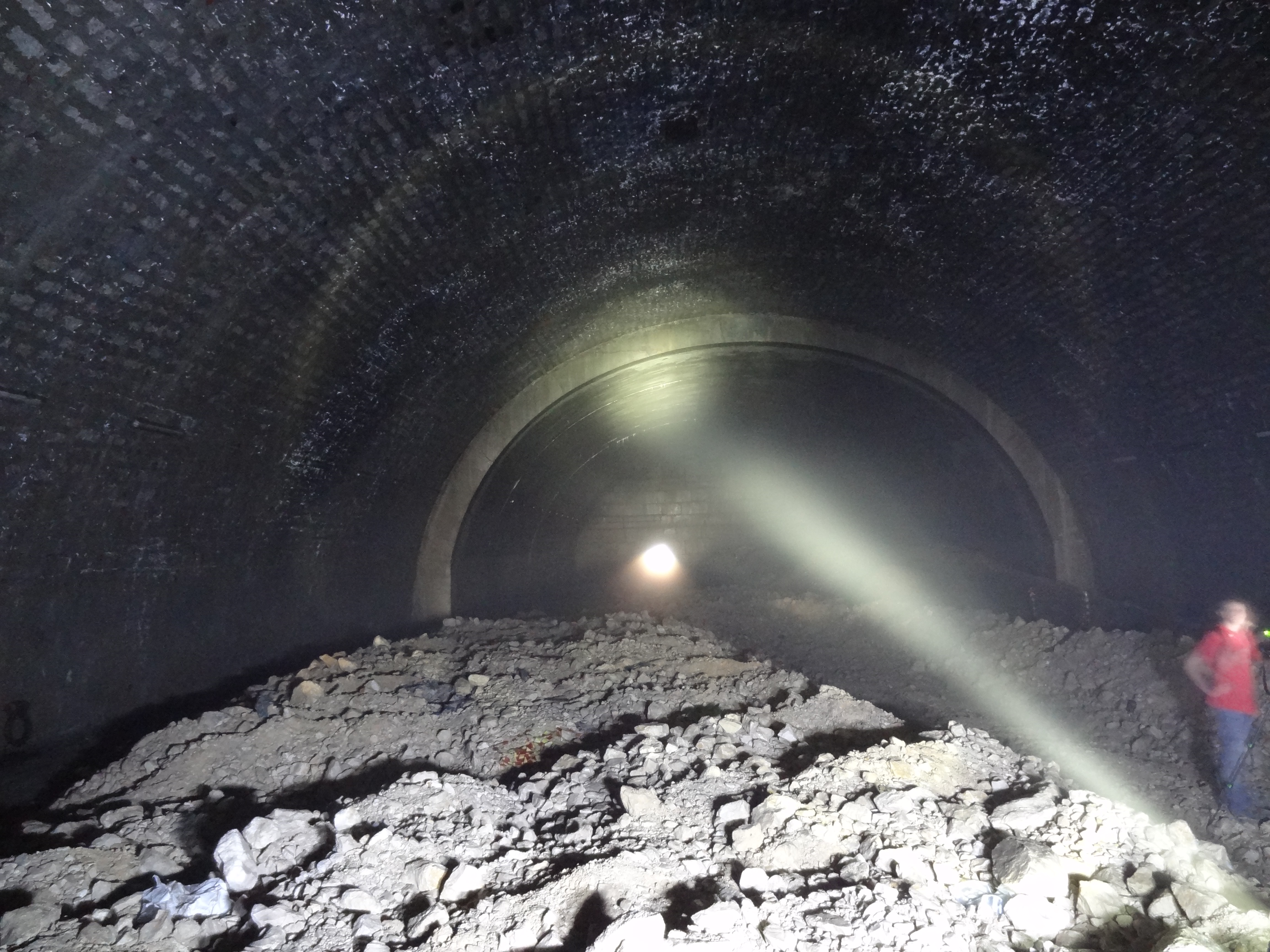
Rubble from the 1963 collapse (2013)

== Sources ==
- Masson, Paul (15 May 1916), "LE CANAL DE MARSEILLE AU RHÔNE", Annales de Géographie, 25e Année (in French) (135), Armand Colin, JSTOR 23439616
- McKnight, Hugh (2013-08-01), Cruising French Waterways, Bloomsbury Publishing, ISBN 978-1-4081-9796-7
- "Rove Tunnel", Infoplease, Sandbox Networks, Inc.
- "Science: Tunnel", Time, 2 May 1927
