= Oppidum d'Ensérune =

Iron Age settlement in Occitanie, France

Ensérune
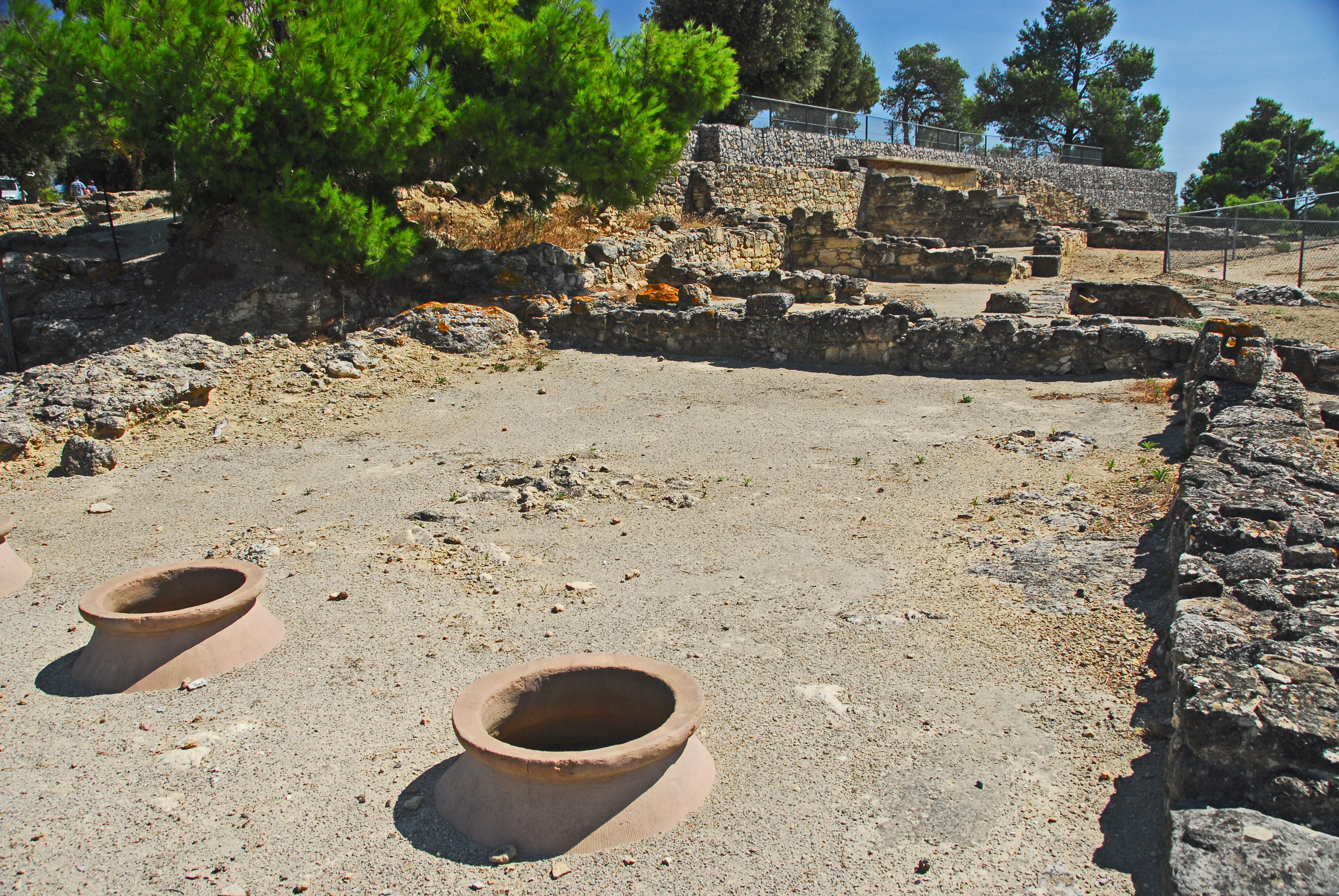

- Location within France
- 43.3061°N 3.138°E
- Type: oppidum
- Cultures: Elisyces, Gauls later Roman
- Location: Nissan-lez-Enserune
- Region: Occitanie, France

Site notes
- Archaeologists: Félix Mouret, Louis Sigal, Jean Jannoray, Joseph Giry
- Public access: Yes
- Website: http://www.enserune.fr/en/

The Oppidum d'Ensérune is an ancient hill-town (or oppidum) near the village of Nissan-lez-Ensérune, France, located between Béziers and Narbonne close to the D609 (formerly RN9) and Canal du Midi. It has been listed since 1935, as a monument historique by the French Ministry of Culture.

The settlement was occupied without interruption between the 6th century BC and 1st century AD on a hill with good views over the coastal plain, being close to the Via Domitia, the Montady lake, and fertile agricultural land below.

There is a museum on the site which offers a display of some of the finds on the site, as well as giving more information about the fort and the field system.

Below the oppidum was the swamp of Montady, (centred on 43°19′12″N 3°07′24″E ), which is now wedge shaped fields separated by irrigation ditches that converge in the centre. In the 13th century, the swamp was drained; the ditches allowed water to flow to the centre of the circular depression, from which it was conveyed through underground pipes several kilometres to the south. The drainage is still functional and remains in use.

== Gallery ==
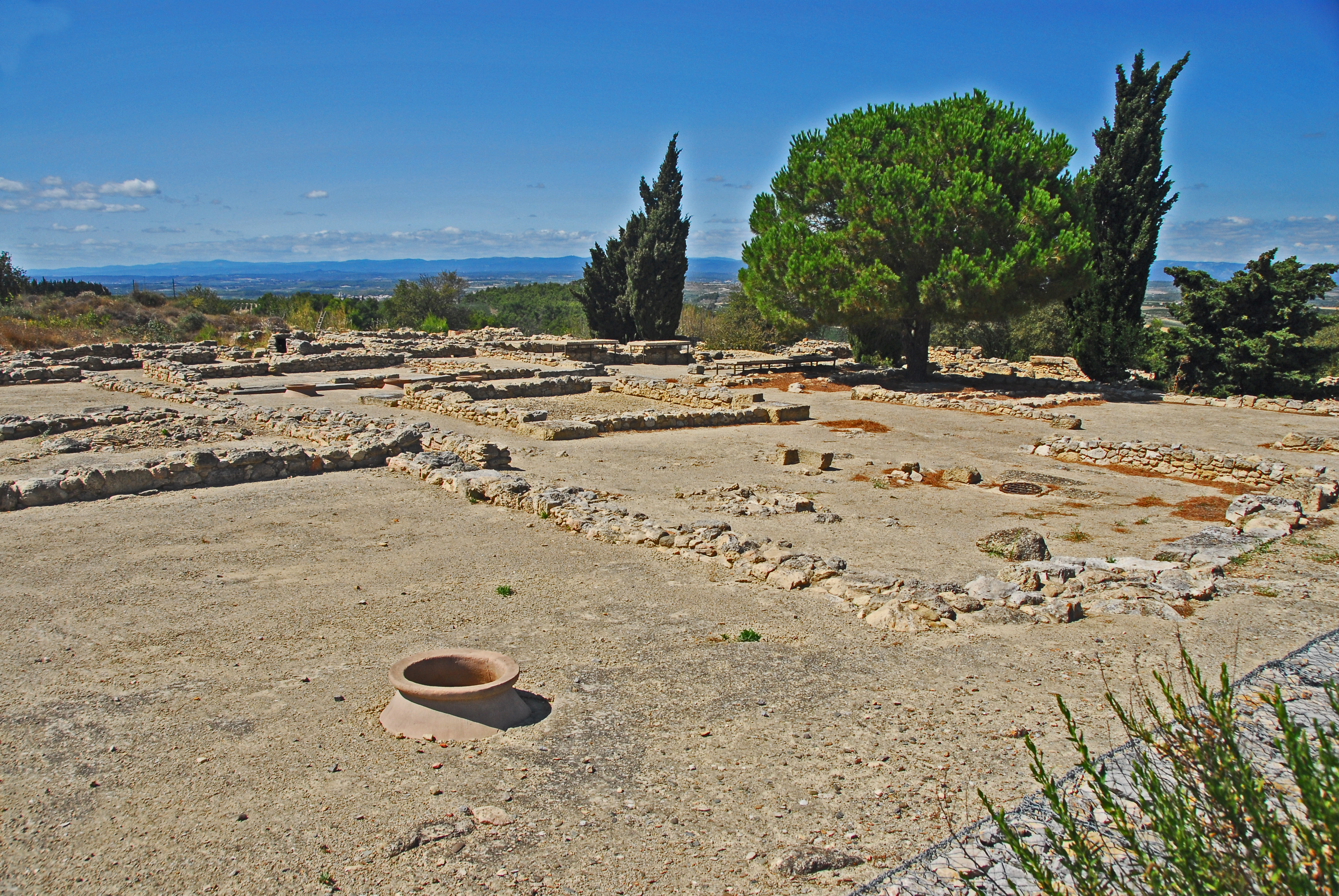
View of the Oppidum

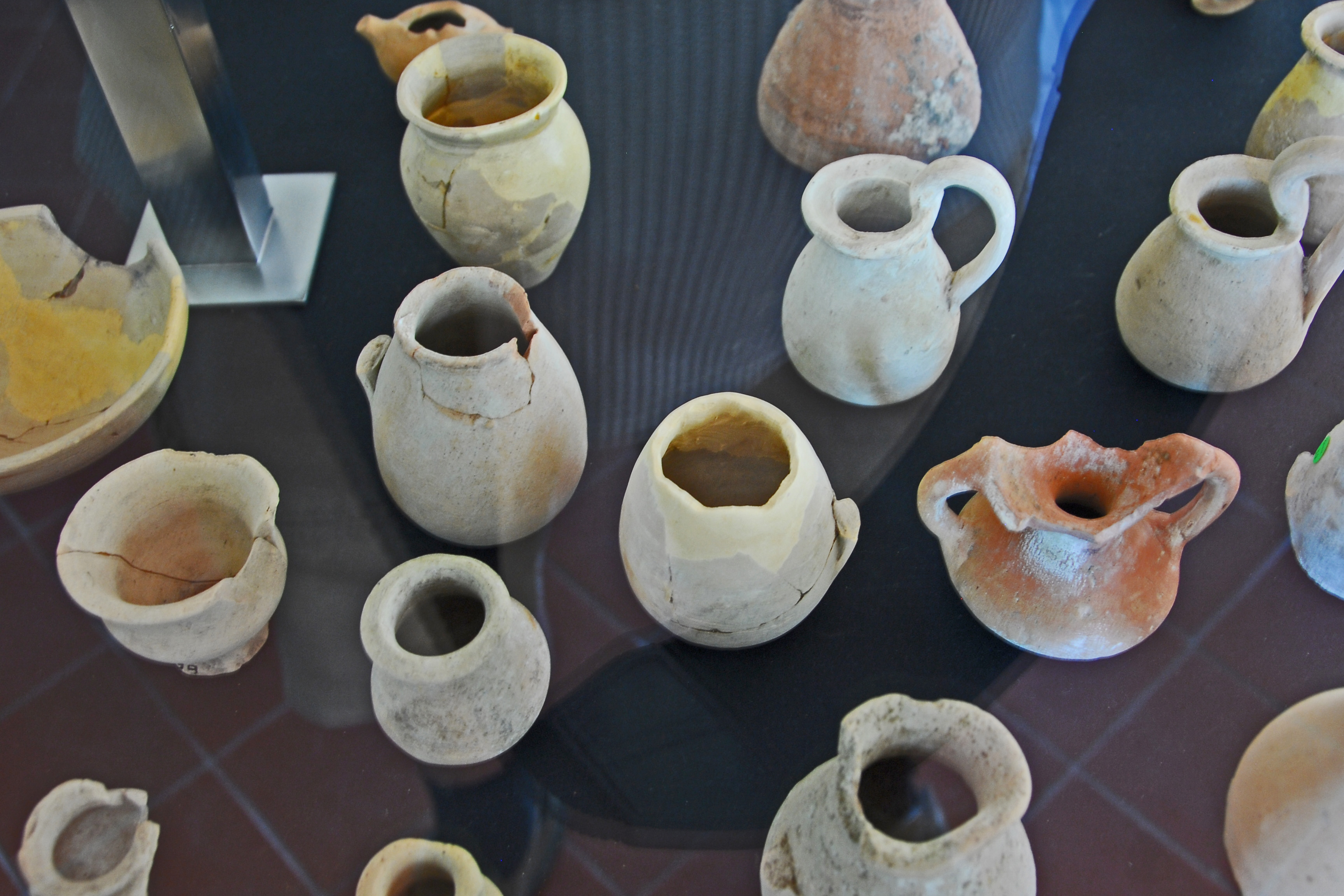
Small jugs in Oppidum d'Ensérune Museum
