= Nissan-lez-Enserune =

- Commune
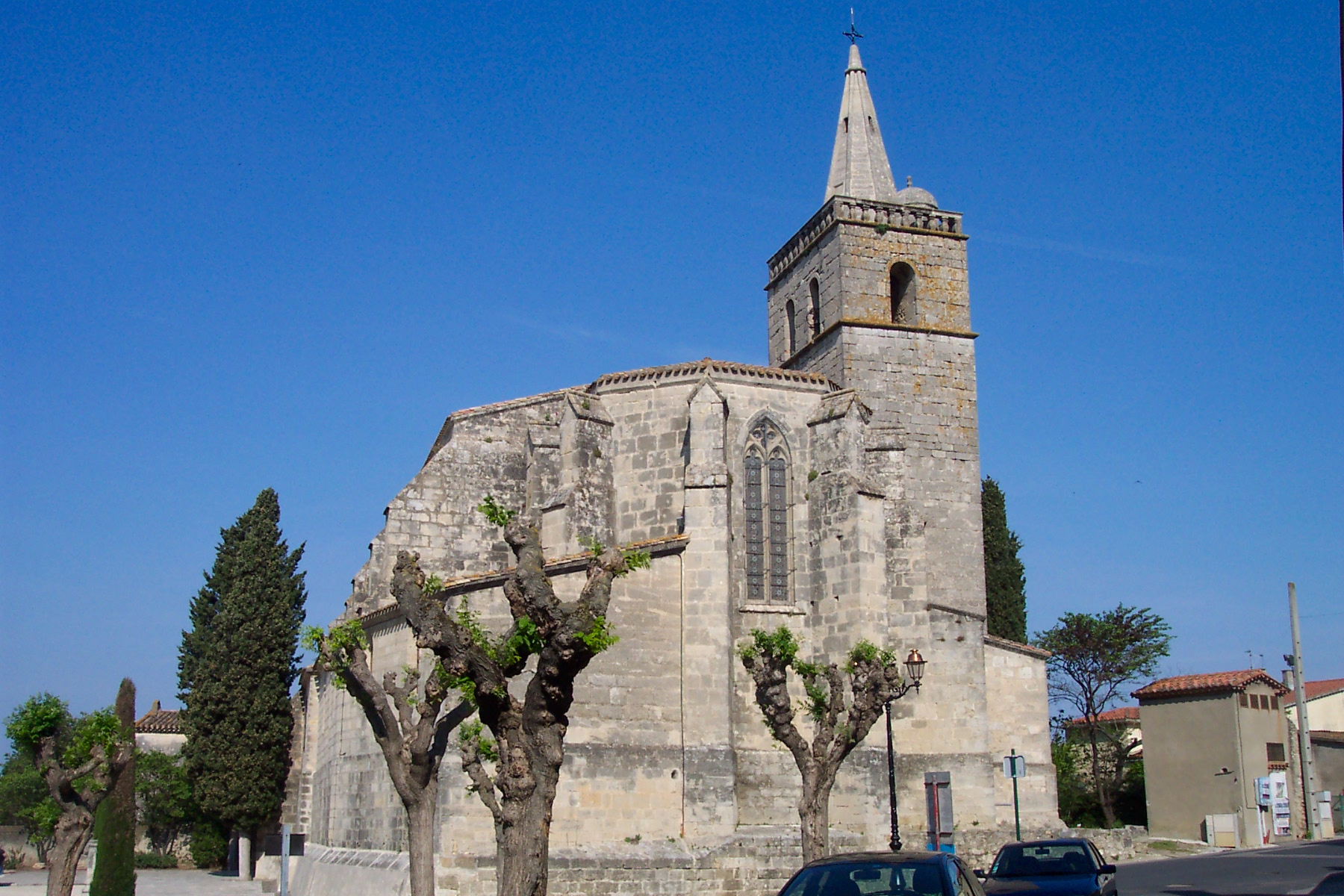
- The church of Nissan-lez-Ensérune

- Coat of arms
- Location of Nissan-lez-Enserune
- Location within France Location within Occitanie
- Coordinates: 43°17′21″N 3°07′46″E
- Country: France
- Region: Occitania
- Department: Hérault
- Arrondissement: Béziers
- Canton: Béziers-1
- Intercommunality: Domitienne

Government
  - Mayor (2020–2026): Pierre Cros
- Area^{1}: 29.74 km^{2} (11.48 sq mi)
- Elevation: 21 m (69 ft)
- Highest elevation: 122 m (400 ft)
- Lowest elevation: 0 m (0 ft)
- Population (2023): 4,124
  - Density: 138.7/km^{2} (359.1/sq mi)
- Demonym: Nissanais.e
- Time zone: UTC+01:00 (CET)
  - Summer (DST): UTC+02:00 (CEST)
- INSEE/Postal code: 34183 /34440
- ^{1} French Land Register data, which excludes lakes, ponds, glaciers > 1 km^{2} (0.386 sq mi or 247 acres) and river estuaries.

Nissan-lez-Enserune (French pronunciation: [nisɑ̃ lez‿ɑ̃seʁyn]; Occitan: Nissa d'Ausseruna, Niça d'Ausseruna), also spelled Nissan-lez-Ensérune, is a French commune in the department of Hérault, region of Occitania, situated just south of Béziers. Its inhabitants are called Nissanais in French.

== Geology and relief ==
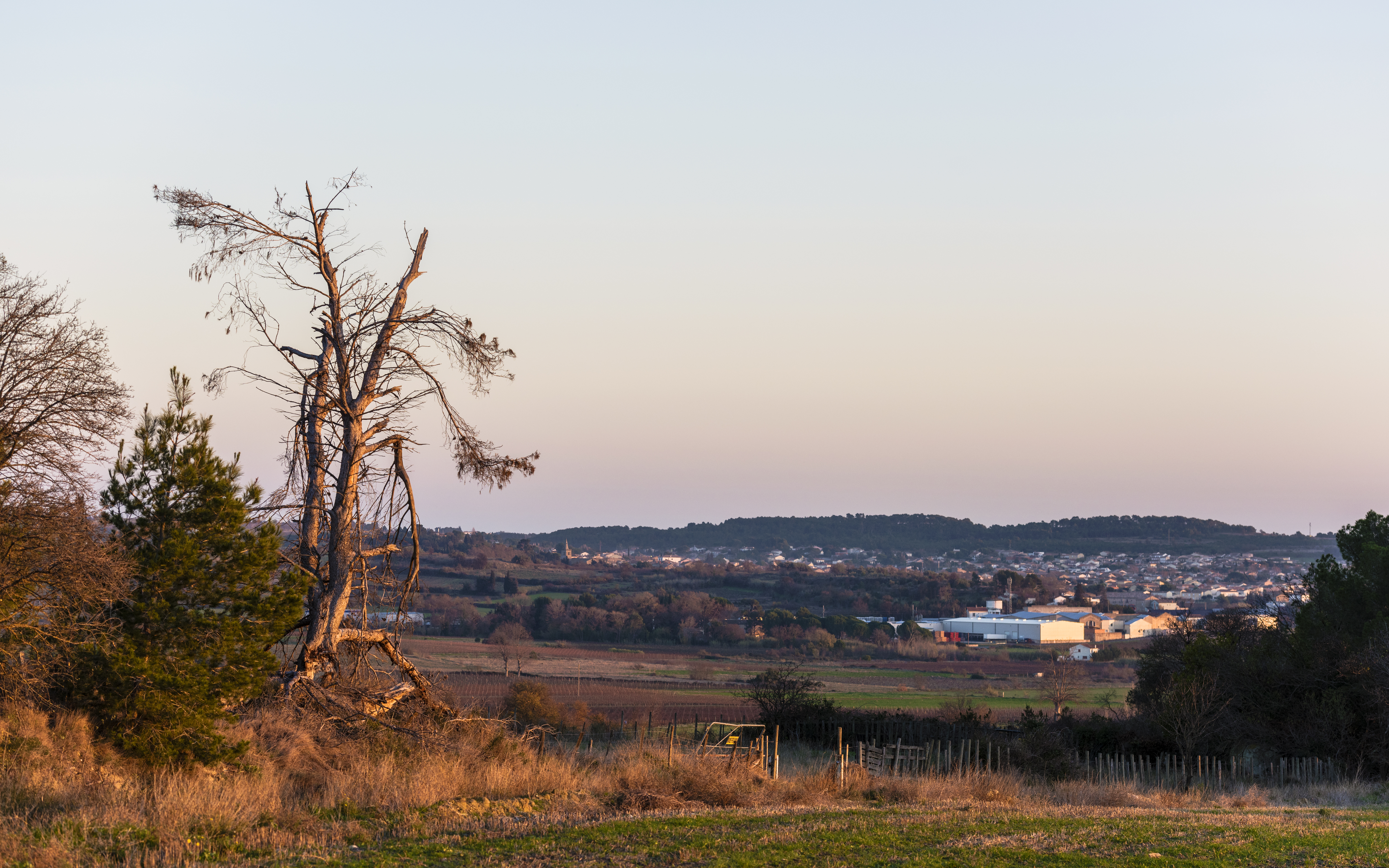
Landscape near Nissan-lez-Ensérune

The surrounding hills to the north are formed of Miocene mounds (including the Ensérune hill) while access to the south is blocked by a long line of Oligocene hills, part of which forms the red clays of Nissan. These clay banks were mined in the 19th century by potters and tile makers. The hills, parts of which have become uncultivated today, are conducive to the cultivation of vines, that are starting colonization again. The decrease in sheep farming has allowed the reforestation (mainly pine forests) of part of the hills, thus offering vast areas for walking and cycling.

Viticulture strongly marked the territory. From Roman times (where it is believed the name of the village originates), the vines spread both on the plain and the hillsides. However, the massive development of this monoculture dates from the end of the 19th century, previous maps and topography attest to the extension of other crops, in particular cereals in the plains areas in older periods (borne out by the three 17th-century windmills that mark the hilltops to the south of village). The old houses in the center of the village, as in all Languedoc villages, often have their own cellars and sheds that once housed wooden casks and horses so much so there is even a street named Avenue de la Cave, but the last wine producer from this street sold up a few years ago.

During the first half of the 20th century, the wine cooperative movement helped to save and keep many small vineyard owners in business. The Nissan cooperative is now part of one of the largest and most active cellar groups in the department, the Vignerons du Pays d'Ensérune.

Nissan benefited from the building of the railway, with a station located a kilometre from the village (however trains are currently not stopping there) around which a small commercial area has grown up, in particular a fruit juice packaging and shipping factory which worked across Europe. The presence of the "royal road" (D6009), a major axis developed at the time of Louis XIV in order to facilitate communications between Béziers and Narbonne, and the construction of the Canal du Midi helped to bring the village to life, although currently it is the villages located on the immediate edge of the canal (Colombiers, Poilhes, Capestang, Sallèles) that take advantage of its tourist appeal.

Since 1970, the village has developed strongly to the south and west with the appearance of new subdivisions of properties and the installation of some new estates to accommodate the new populations of urban workers (popular because Béziers is 10 km and Narbonne 20 km). The number of inhabitants directly involved in viticulture has greatly decreased. However, there are still a few vignerons with vines surrounding the village who still take up the challenge of producing quality wines and participate in the new development of southern viticulture. There is also a small but serious olive sector producing boutique olive products.

== Population ==
Historical population
| Year | Pop. | ±% p.a. |
|---|---|---|
| 1968 | 2,450 | — |
| 1975 | 2,251 | −1.20% |
| 1982 | 2,519 | +1.62% |
| 1990 | 2,835 | +1.49% |
| 1999 | 2,907 | +0.28% |
| 2007 | 3,327 | +1.70% |
| 2012 | 3,844 | +2.93% |
| 2017 | 3,995 | +0.77% |
| 2023 | 4,124 | +0.53% |
Source: INSEE

== International relations ==
Nissan-lez-Enserune is twinned with

- Ampthill, United Kingdom.

== See also ==
- Communes of the Hérault department
