= Colombiers, Hérault =

Colombiers
- Commune
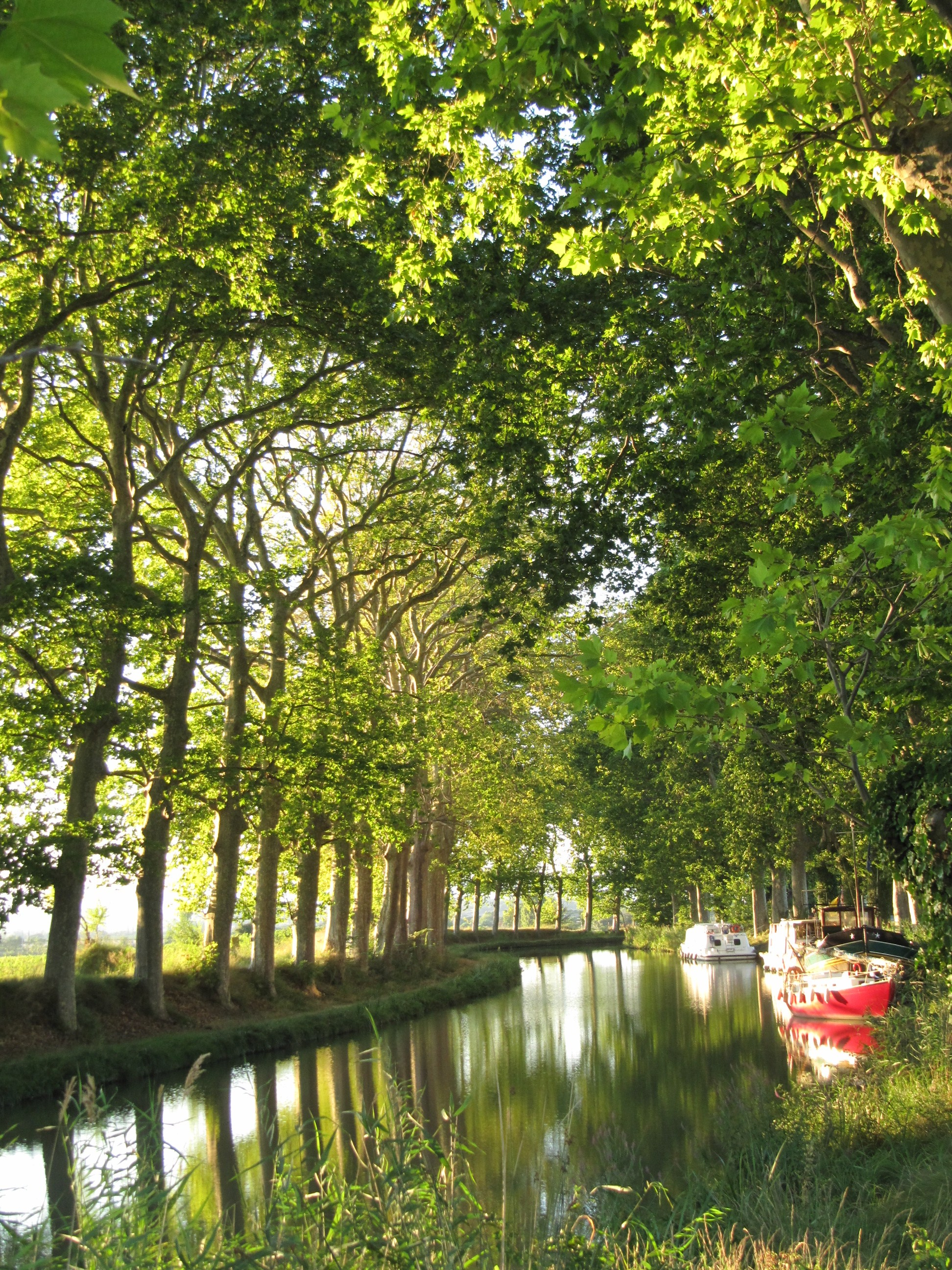
- Canal du Midi in Colombiers

- Coat of arms
- Location of Colombiers
- Location within France Location within Occitanie
- Coordinates: 43°18′50″N 3°08′29″E
- Country: France
- Region: Occitania
- Department: Hérault
- Arrondissement: Béziers
- Canton: Cazouls-lès-Béziers
- Intercommunality: Domitienne

Government
  - Mayor (2020–2026): Alain Caralp
- Area^{1}: 10.14 km^{2} (3.92 sq mi)
- Elevation: 25 m (82 ft)
- Highest elevation: 100 m (330 ft)
- Lowest elevation: 21 m (69 ft)
- Population (2023): 2,814
  - Density: 277.5/km^{2} (718.8/sq mi)
- Time zone: UTC+01:00 (CET)
  - Summer (DST): UTC+02:00 (CEST)
- INSEE/Postal code: 34081 /34440
- ^{1} French Land Register data, which excludes lakes, ponds, glaciers > 1 km^{2} (0.386 sq mi or 247 acres) and river estuaries.

Colombiers (French pronunciation: [kɔlɔ̃bje]; Occitan: Colombièrs) is a commune in the Hérault department in southern France.

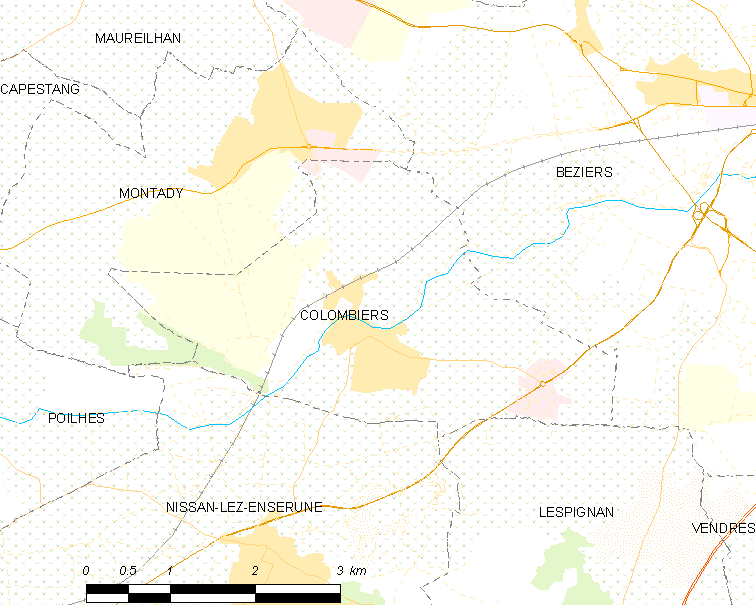
Map

== Population ==
Historical population
Year	Pop.	±% p.a.
1968	969	—
1975	905	−0.97%
1982	1,095	+2.76%
1990	1,647	+5.23%
1999	2,065	+2.54%
2007	2,373	+1.75%
2012	2,337	−0.31%
2017	2,484	+1.23%
2023	2,814	+2.10%
Source: INSEE

== See also ==
- Communes of the Hérault department
