= Aumelas =

- Commune
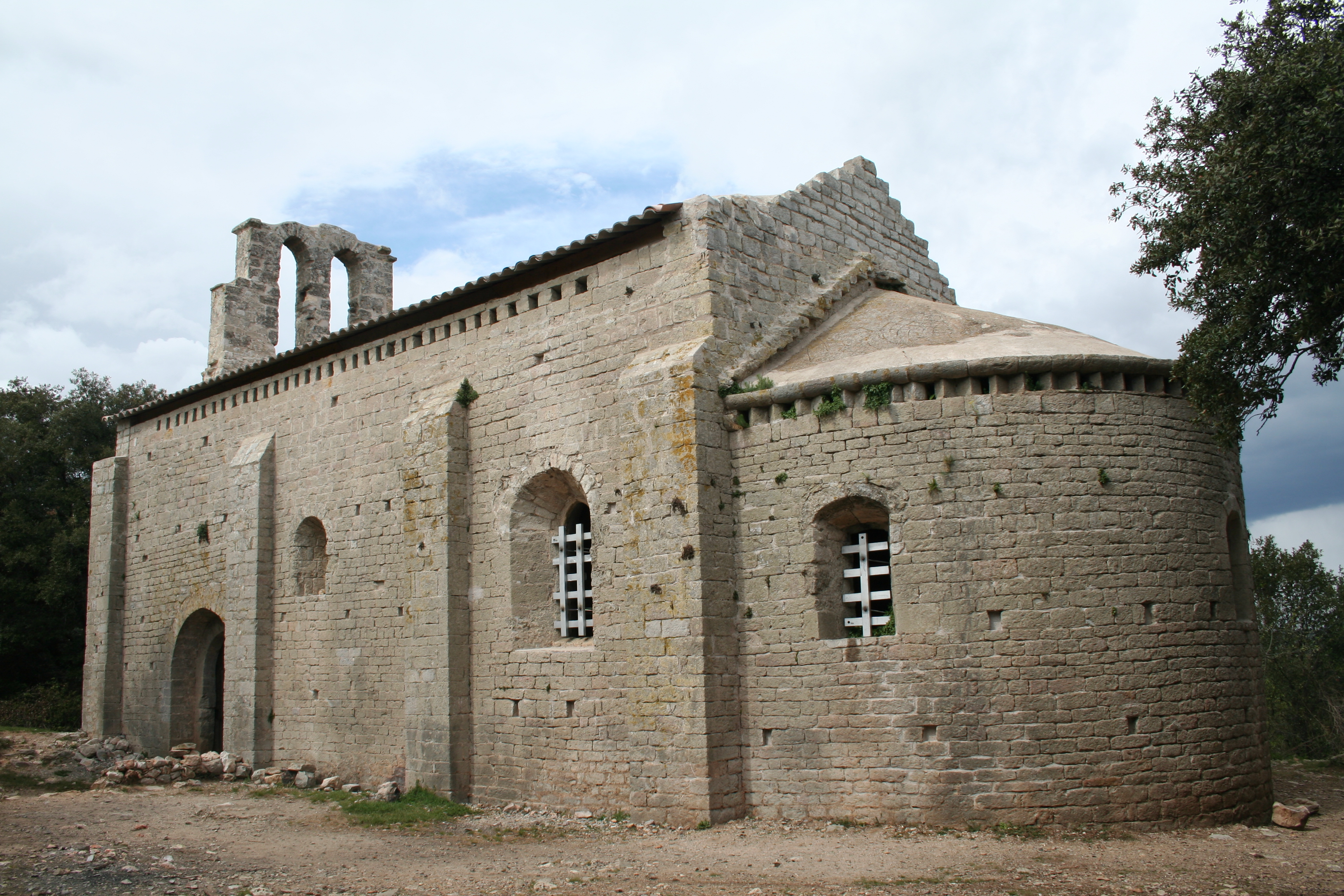
- Chapel of Cardonnet

- Coat of arms
- Location of Aumelas
- Location within France Location within Occitanie
- Coordinates: 43°36′14″N 3°35′57″E
- Country: France
- Region: Occitania
- Department: Hérault
- Arrondissement: Lodève
- Canton: Gignac
- Intercommunality: CC Vallée Hérault

Government
  - Mayor (2020–2026): Ronny Poncé
- Area^{1}: 58.26 km^{2} (22.49 sq mi)
- Elevation: 295 m (968 ft)
- Highest elevation: 341 m (1,119 ft)
- Lowest elevation: 64 m (210 ft)
- Population (2023): 624
  - Density: 10.7/km^{2} (27.7/sq mi)
- Time zone: UTC+01:00 (CET)
  - Summer (DST): UTC+02:00 (CEST)
- INSEE/Postal code: 34016 /34230
- ^{1} French Land Register data, which excludes lakes, ponds, glaciers > 1 km^{2} (0.386 sq mi or 247 acres) and river estuaries.

Aumelas (French pronunciation: [om(ə)las]; Languedocien: Aumelaç) is a commune in the Hérault department in southern France.

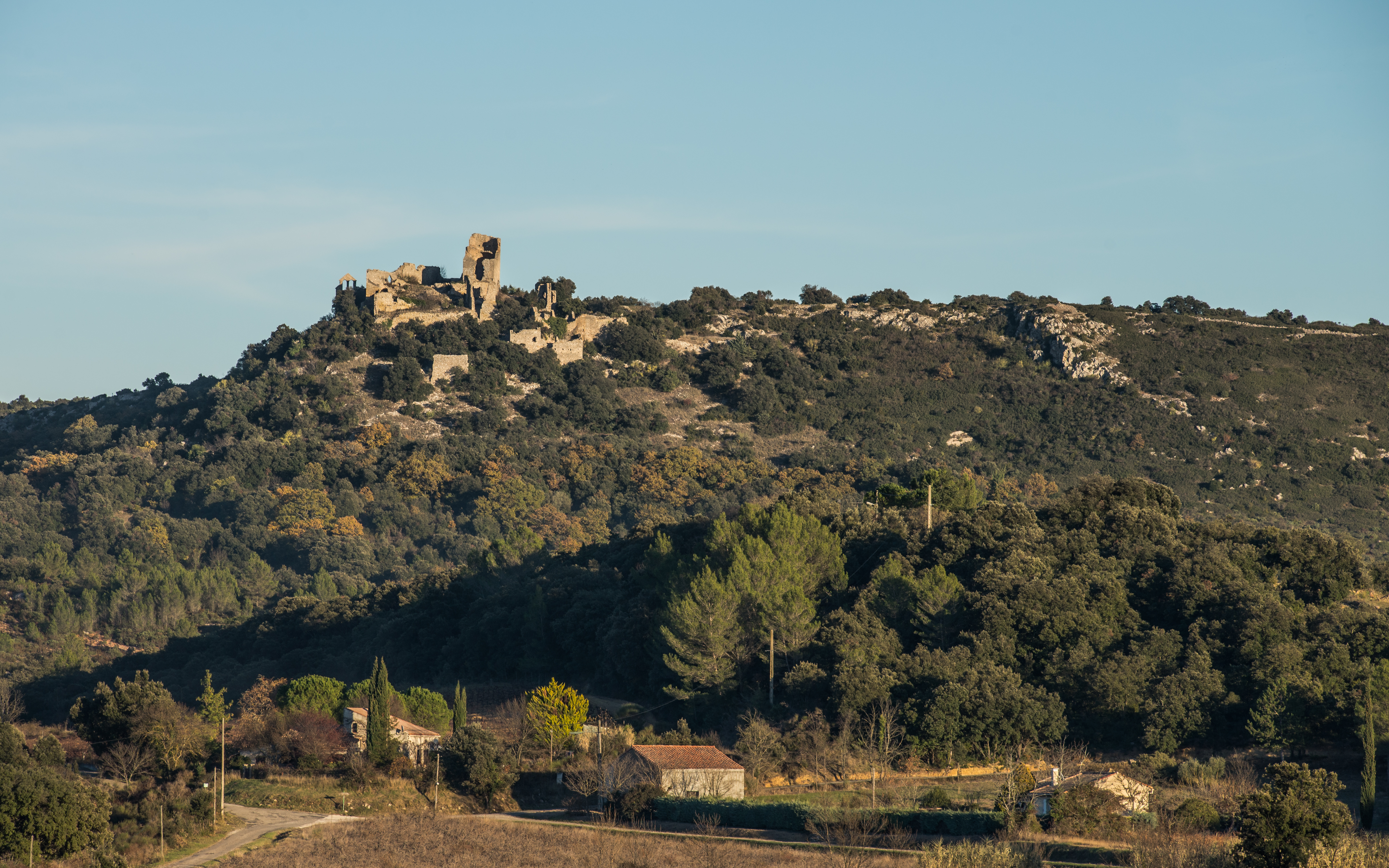
The castle from West

== Geography ==
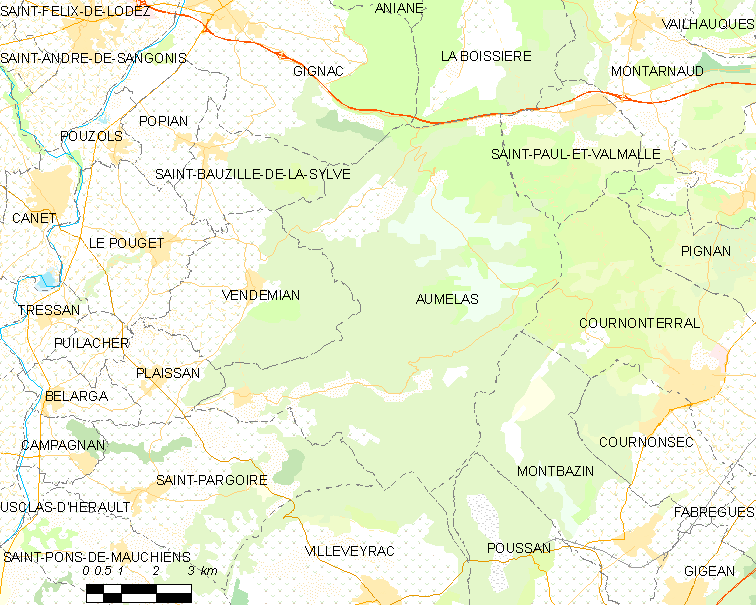
Map

The neighboring communes are La Boissière to the north, Saint-Paul-et-Valmalle to the northeast, Cournonterral to the east, Montbazin to the east-southeast, Saint-Pargoire and Villeveyrac to the south, Plaissan to the southwest, Saint-Bauzille-de-la-Sylve and Vendémian to the west and Gignac to the northwest.

=== Climate ===
In 2010, the climate of the commune is classified as a frank Mediterranean climate, according to a study based on a dataset covering the 1971-2000 period. In 2020, Météo-France published a typology of climates in mainland France in which the commune is exposed to a Mediterranean climate and is part of the Provence, Languedoc-Roussillon climatic region, characterized by low rainfall in summer, very good sunshine (2,600 h/year), a hot summer 21.5 °C (71 °F), very dry air in summer, dry conditions in all seasons, strong winds (with a frequency of 40 to 50% for winds > 5 m/s), and little fog.

For the 1971-2000 period, the average annual temperature was 13.9 °C (57 °F) with an annual atmospheric temperature of 15.8 °C (60 °F). The average annual total rainfall during this period was 837 mm, with 6.9 days of precipitation in January and 2.7 days in July. For the subsequent period of 1991 to 2020, the average annual temperature observed at the nearest weather station, located in the commune of Saint-André-de-Sangonis, 9 kilometres (6 mi) away as the crow flies, is 15.5 °C (60 °F), and the average annual total rainfall is 652.4 mm.

For the future, climate parameters for the commune projected for 2050, based on different greenhouse gas emission scenarios, can be consulted on a dedicated website published by Météo-France in November 2022.

== Population ==
Historical population

Year	Pop.	±% p.a.
1793	240	—
1800	145	−6.95%
1806	290	+12.25%
1821	315	+0.55%
1831	274	−1.38%
1836	284	+0.72%
1841	281	−0.21%
1846	263	−1.32%
1851	281	+1.33%
1856	313	+2.18%
1861	303	−0.65%
1866	293	−0.67%
1872	259	−2.03%
1876	245	−1.38%
1881	223	−1.86%
1886	228	+0.44%
1891	256	+2.34%
1896	261	+0.39%
1901	252	−0.70%

Year	Pop.	±% p.a.
1906	225	−2.24%
1911	259	+2.85%
1921	257	−0.08%
1926	279	+1.66%
1931	261	−1.32%
1936	219	−3.45%
1946	199	−0.95%
1954	218	+1.15%
1962	210	−0.47%
1968	225	+1.16%
1975	191	−2.31%
1982	245	+3.62%
1990	332	+3.87%
1999	378	+1.45%
2007	459	+2.46%
2012	504	+1.89%
2017	526	+0.86%
2023	624	+2.89%

Source: Ldh/EHESS/Cassini until 1999, and INSEE since 2007.

== See also ==
- Communes of the Hérault department
