= Saint-Bauzille-de-la-Sylve =

- Commune
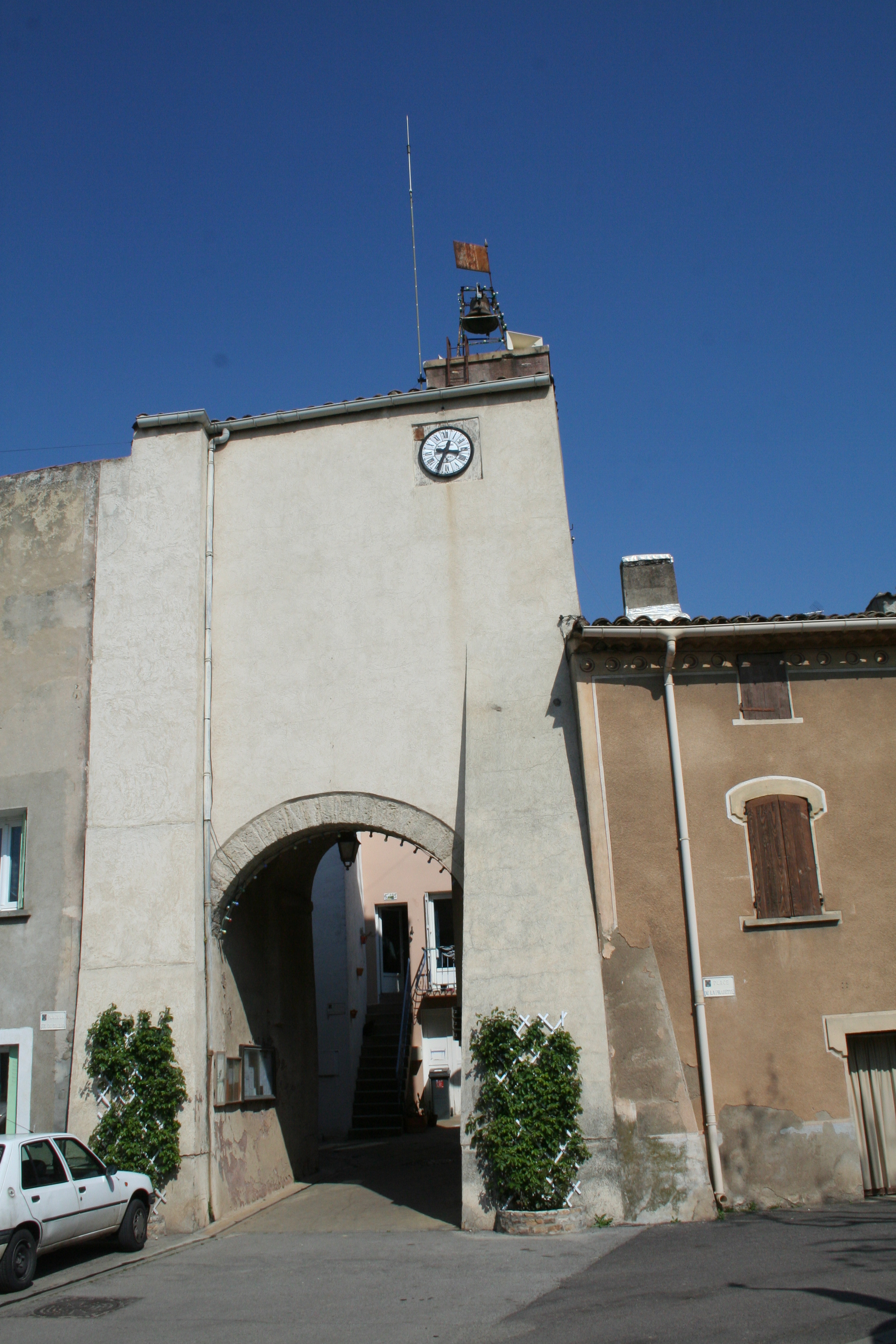
- Town gate

- Coat of arms
- Location of Saint-Bauzille-de-la-Sylve
- Location within France Location within Occitanie
- Coordinates: 43°37′05″N 3°32′49″E
- Country: France
- Region: Occitania
- Department: Hérault
- Arrondissement: Lodève
- Canton: Gignac
- Intercommunality: Vallée de l'Hérault

Government
  - Mayor (2020–2026): Grégory Bro
- Area^{1}: 8.63 km^{2} (3.33 sq mi)
- Elevation: 60 m (200 ft)
- Highest elevation: 247 m (810 ft)
- Lowest elevation: 68 m (223 ft)
- Population (2023): 947
  - Density: 110/km^{2} (284/sq mi)
- Time zone: UTC+01:00 (CET)
  - Summer (DST): UTC+02:00 (CEST)
- INSEE/Postal code: 34241 /34230
- ^{1} French Land Register data, which excludes lakes, ponds, glaciers > 1 km^{2} (0.386 sq mi or 247 acres) and river estuaries.

Saint-Bauzille-de-la-Sylve (French pronunciation: [sɛ̃ bozil də la silv]; Occitan: Sant Bausèli de la Seuva) is a commune in the Hérault department in the Occitanie region in southern France.

== Geography ==
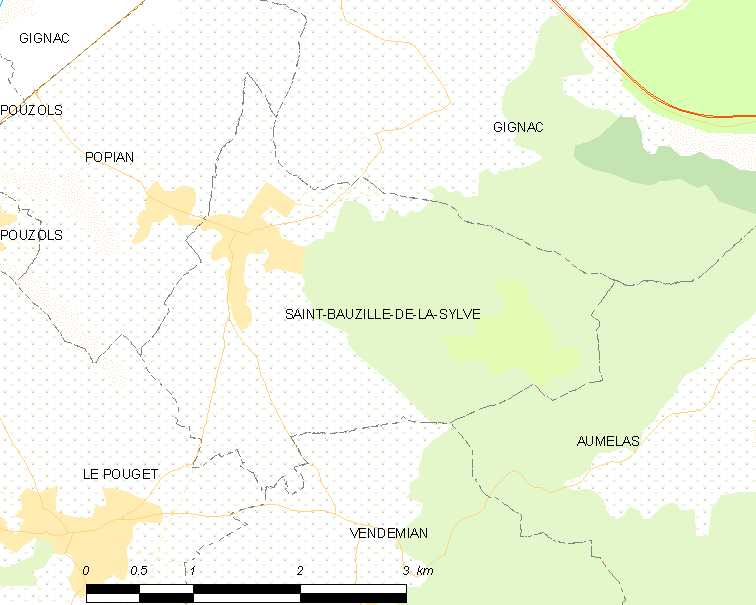
Map

Equidistant from the sea and the mountains, this village, located in the canton of Gignac, 33 kilometres (21 mi) west of Montpellier and near the banks of the Hérault River, is overlooked to the east by the imposing ruins of the Château d'Aumelas.

The neighboring communes are Gignac, Aumelas, Vendémian, Le Pouget, Popian.

=== Climate ===
In 2010, the climate of the commune is classified as a frank Mediterranean climate, according to a study based on a dataset covering the 1971-2000 period. In 2020, Météo-France published a typology of climates in mainland France in which the commune is exposed to a Mediterranean climate and is part of the Provence, Languedoc-Roussillon climatic region, characterized by low rainfall in summer, very good sunshine (2,600 h/year), a hot summer 21.5 °C (71 °F), very dry air in summer, dry conditions in all seasons, strong winds (with a frequency of 40 to 50% for winds > 5 m/s), and little fog.

For the 1971-2000 period, the average annual temperature was 14.2 °C (58 °F) with an annual atmospheric temperature of 16.4 °C (62 °F). The average annual total rainfall during this period was 782 mm, with 6.4 days of precipitation in January and 2.7 days in July. For the subsequent period of 1991 to 2020, the average annual temperature observed at the nearest weather station, located in the commune of Saint-André-de-Sangonis, 5 kilometres (3 mi) away as the crow flies, is 15.5 °C (60 °F), and the average annual total rainfall is 652.4 mm.

For the future, climate parameters for the commune projected for 2050, based on different greenhouse gas emission scenarios, can be consulted on a dedicated website published by Météo-France in November 2022.

== Population ==
Historical population

Year	Pop.	±% p.a.
1793	444	—
1800	445	+0.03%
1806	568	+4.15%
1821	551	−0.20%
1831	580	+0.51%
1836	558	−0.77%
1841	537	−0.76%
1846	524	−0.49%
1851	560	+1.34%
1856	577	+0.60%
1861	543	−1.21%
1866	541	−0.07%
1872	601	+1.77%
1876	614	+0.54%
1881	472	−5.12%
1886	460	−0.51%
1891	479	+0.81%
1896	520	+1.66%
1901	524	+0.15%

Year	Pop.	±% p.a.
1906	512	−0.46%
1911	546	+1.29%
1921	564	+0.32%
1926	591	+0.94%
1931	550	−1.43%
1936	586	+1.28%
1946	576	−0.17%
1954	612	+0.76%
1962	618	+0.12%
1968	605	−0.35%
1975	529	−1.90%
1982	527	−0.05%
1990	602	+1.68%
1999	720	+2.01%
2007	808	+1.45%
2012	837	+0.71%
2017	812	−0.60%
2023	947	+2.60%

Source: Ldh/EHESS/Cassini until 1999, and INSEE since 2007.

== See also ==
- Communes of the Hérault department
