= Puilacher =

- Commune
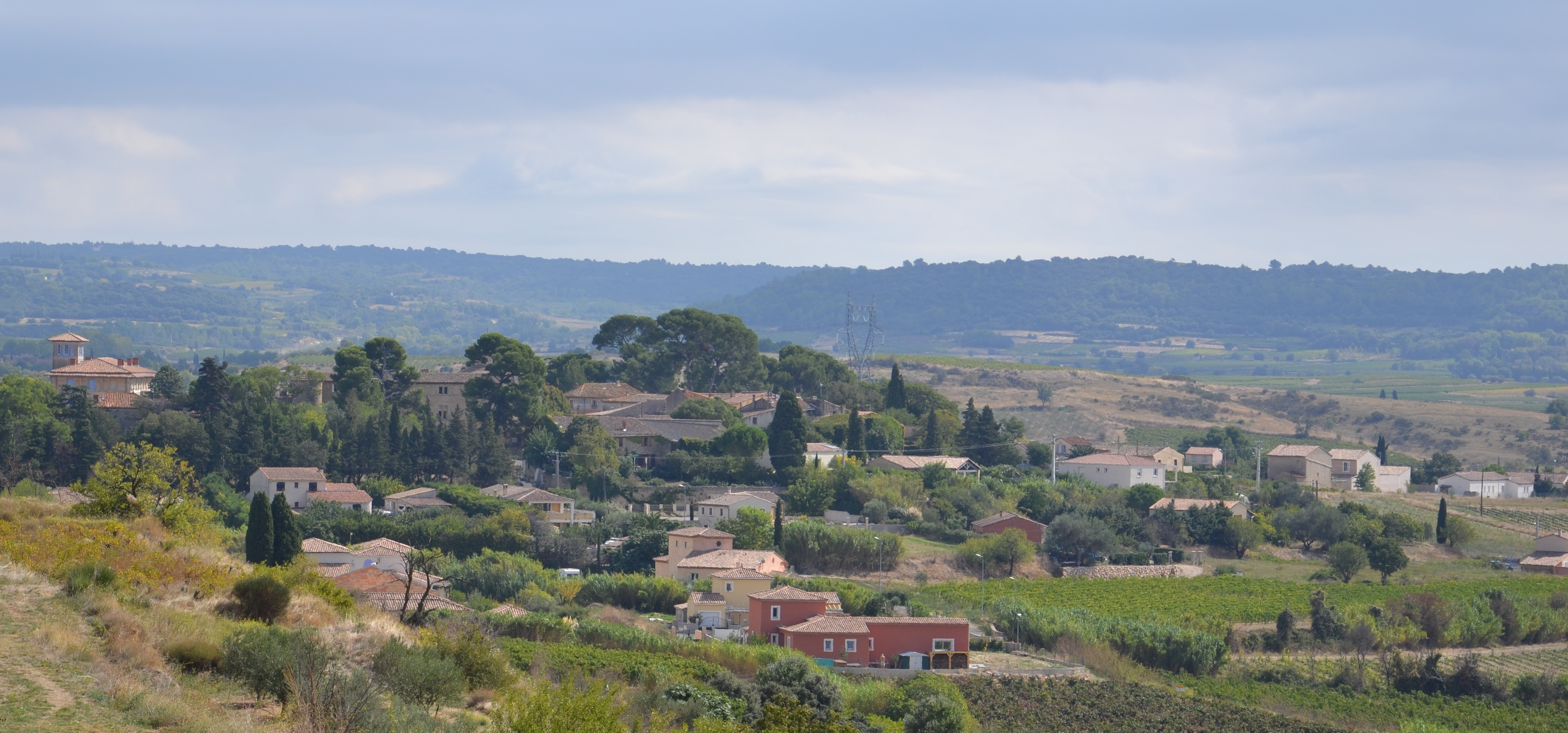
- A general view of Puilacher

- Coat of arms
- Location of Puilacher
- Location within France Location within Occitanie
- Coordinates: 43°34′01″N 3°30′26″E
- Country: France
- Region: Occitania
- Department: Hérault
- Arrondissement: Lodève
- Canton: Gignac
- Intercommunality: Vallée de l'Hérault

Government
  - Mayor (2020–2026): Martine Bonnet
- Area^{1}: 2.68 km^{2} (1.03 sq mi)
- Elevation: 65 m (213 ft)
- Highest elevation: 99 m (325 ft)
- Lowest elevation: 27 m (89 ft)
- Population (2023): 657
  - Density: 245/km^{2} (635/sq mi)
- Time zone: UTC+01:00 (CET)
  - Summer (DST): UTC+02:00 (CEST)
- INSEE/Postal code: 34222 /34230
- ^{1} French Land Register data, which excludes lakes, ponds, glaciers > 1 km^{2} (0.386 sq mi or 247 acres) and river estuaries.

Puilacher (French pronunciation: [pɥilaʃe]; Occitan: Puòglatgièr) is a commune in the Hérault department in the Occitanie region in southern France.

== Geography ==
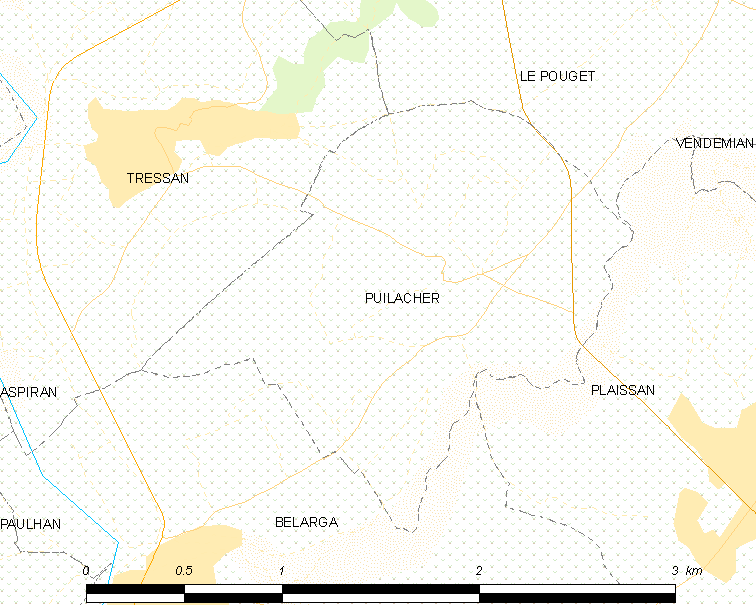
Map

The neighboring communes are Le Pouget, Tressan, Plaissan and Bélarga.

=== Climate ===
In 2010, the climate of the commune is classified as a frank Mediterranean climate, according to a study based on a dataset covering the 1971-2000 period. In 2020, Météo-France published a typology of climates in mainland France in which the commune is exposed to a Mediterranean climate and is part of the Provence, Languedoc-Roussillon climatic region, characterized by low rainfall in summer, very good sunshine (2,600 h/year), a hot summer 21.5 °C (71 °F), very dry air in summer, dry conditions in all seasons, strong winds (with a frequency of 40 to 50% for winds > 5 m/s), and little fog.

For the 1971-2000 period, the average annual temperature was 14.7 °C (58 °F) with an annual atmospheric temperature of 16.3 °C (61 °F). The average annual total rainfall during this period was 699 mm, with 6.1 days of precipitation in January and 2.6 days in July. For the subsequent period of 1991 to 2020, the average annual temperature observed at the nearest weather station, located in the commune of Saint-André-de-Sangonis, 9 kilometres (6 mi) away as the crow flies, is 15.5 °C (60 °F), and the average annual total rainfall is 652.4 mm.

For the future, climate parameters for the commune projected for 2050, based on different greenhouse gas emission scenarios, can be consulted on a dedicated website published by Météo-France in November 2022.

== Population ==
Historical population

| Year | Pop. | ±% p.a. |
|---|---|---|
| 1793 | 70 | — |
| 1800 | 87 | +3.15% |
| 1806 | 86 | −0.19% |
| 1821 | 109 | +1.59% |
| 1831 | 102 | −0.66% |
| 1836 | 104 | +0.39% |
| 1841 | 105 | +0.19% |
| 1846 | 93 | −2.40% |
| 1851 | 102 | +1.86% |
| 1856 | 110 | +1.52% |
| 1861 | 116 | +1.07% |
| 1866 | 122 | +1.01% |
| 1872 | 112 | −1.42% |
| 1876 | 101 | −2.55% |
| 1881 | 100 | −0.20% |
| 1886 | 82 | −3.89% |
| 1891 | 118 | +7.55% |
| 1896 | 106 | −2.12% |
| 1901 | 127 | +3.68% |

| Year | Pop. | ±% p.a. |
|---|---|---|
| 1906 | 166 | +5.50% |
| 1911 | 201 | +3.90% |
| 1921 | 189 | −0.61% |
| 1926 | 205 | +1.64% |
| 1931 | 236 | +2.86% |
| 1936 | 181 | −5.17% |
| 1946 | 163 | −1.04% |
| 1954 | 137 | −2.15% |
| 1962 | 158 | +1.80% |
| 1968 | 163 | +0.52% |
| 1975 | 128 | −3.39% |
| 1982 | 131 | +0.33% |
| 1990 | 132 | +0.10% |
| 1999 | 156 | +1.87% |
| 2007 | 296 | +8.34% |
| 2012 | 427 | +7.60% |
| 2017 | 578 | +6.24% |
| 2023 | 657 | +2.16% |

Source: Ldh/EHESS/Cassini until 1999, and INSEE since 2007.

== See also ==
- Communes of the Hérault department
