= Tressan =

- Commune
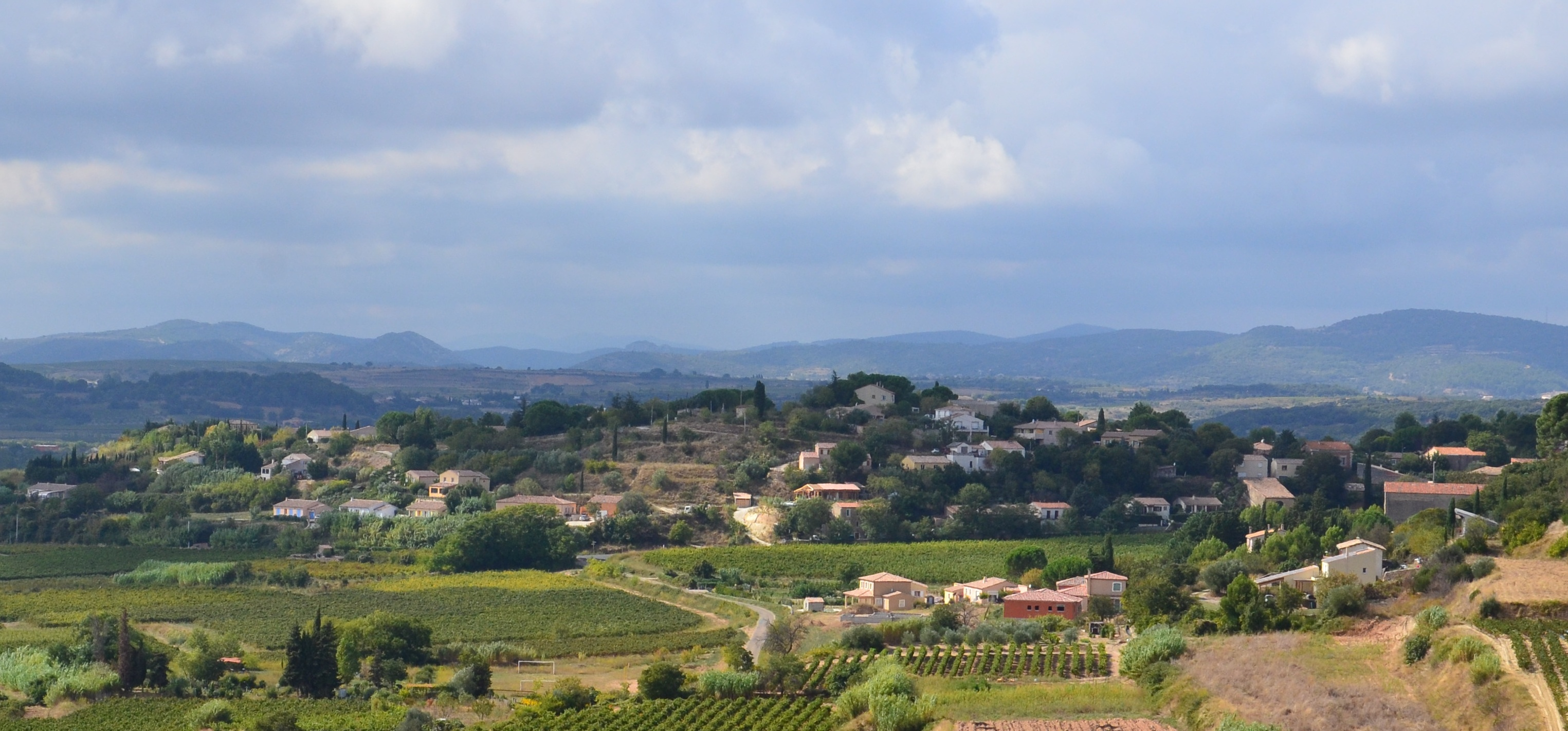
- A general view of Tressan

- Coat of arms
- Location of Tressan
- Location within France Location within Occitanie
- Coordinates: 43°34′32″N 3°29′27″E
- Country: France
- Region: Occitania
- Department: Hérault
- Arrondissement: Lodève
- Canton: Gignac
- Intercommunality: Vallée de l'Hérault

Government
  - Mayor (2020–2026): Daniel Jaudon
- Area^{1}: 3.92 km^{2} (1.51 sq mi)
- Elevation: 80 m (260 ft)
- Highest elevation: 100 m (330 ft)
- Lowest elevation: 17 m (56 ft)
- Population (2023): 683
  - Density: 174/km^{2} (451/sq mi)
- Time zone: UTC+01:00 (CET)
  - Summer (DST): UTC+02:00 (CEST)
- INSEE/Postal code: 34313 /34230
- ^{1} French Land Register data, which excludes lakes, ponds, glaciers > 1 km^{2} (0.386 sq mi or 247 acres) and river estuaries.

Tressan (French pronunciation: [tʁɛsɑ̃]; Occitan: Treçan) is a commune in the Hérault department in the Occitanie region in southern France.

Subject to a Mediterranean climate, the area is drained by the Hérault and Dourbie rivers. The commune hosts remarkable natural heritage, featuring two natural areas of ecological, faunistic, and floristic interest (Zone naturelle d'intérêt écologique, faunistique et floristique, ZNIEFF). Tressan is a rural commune, part of the Montpellier attraction area. Its inhabitants are known as Tressanais (for men) and Tressanaises (for women).

== Geography ==
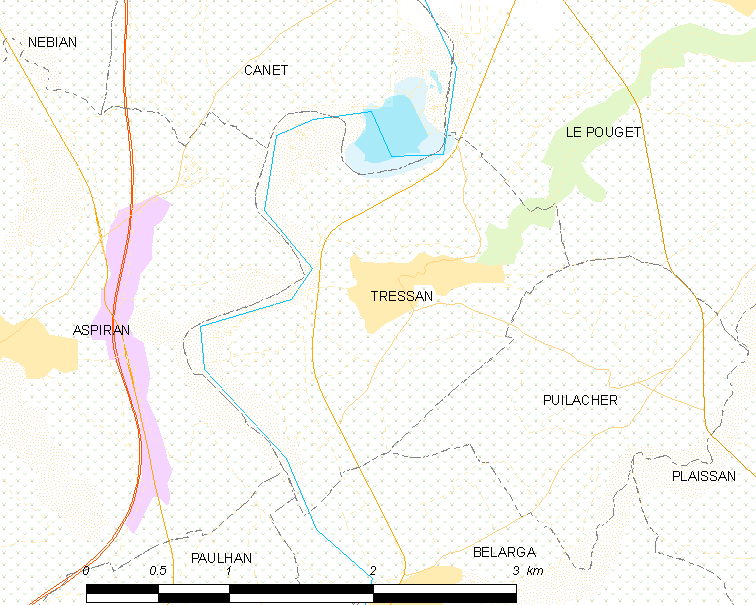
Map

Tressan is located on the road between Gignac and Pézenas, extending across a hill in the Hérault Valley.

The neighboring communes are Canet, Le Pouget, Puilacher, Bélarga, Paulhan and Aspiran.

=== Climate ===
In 2010, the climate of the commune is classified as a frank Mediterranean climate, according to a study based on a dataset covering the 1971-2000 period. In 2020, Météo-France published a typology of climates in mainland France in which the commune is exposed to a Mediterranean climate and is part of the Provence, Languedoc-Roussillon climatic region, characterized by low rainfall in summer, very good sunshine (2,600 h/year), a hot summer 21.5 °C (71 °F), very dry air in summer, dry conditions in all seasons, strong winds (with a frequency of 40 to 50% for winds > 5 m/s), and little fog.

For the 1971-2000 period, the average annual temperature was 14.7 °C (58 °F) with an annual atmospheric temperature of 16.4 °C (62 °F). The average annual total rainfall during this period was 669 mm, with 6.1 days of precipitation in January and 2.7 days in July. For the subsequent period of 1991 to 2020, the average annual temperature observed at the nearest weather station, located in the commune of Saint-André-de-Sangonis, 8 kilometres (5 mi) away as the crow flies, is 15.5 °C (60 °F), and the average annual total rainfall is 652.4 mm.

For the future, climate parameters for the commune projected for 2050, based on different greenhouse gas emission scenarios, can be consulted on a dedicated website published by Météo-France in November 2022.

== Urbanism ==
=== Typology ===
As of 1 January 2024, Tressan is classified as an ‘bourg rural’ (rural township) according to the new seven-level commune density grid established by Insee in 2022. The commune is located outside of any urban unit. Additionally, Tressan belongs to the Montpellier attraction area, where it is designated as a commuter town. (Note: The concept of a functional area replaced the former concept of an urban area in October 2020, enabling consistent comparisons with other European Union countries.) This area, encompassing 161 communes, falls under the category of areas with 700,000 inhabitants or more (excluding Paris).

=== Land Use ===
The land use in the commune, as recorded in the European biophysical land use database, Corine Land Cover (CLC), is characterized by agricultural areas (87.7% in 2018), an approximately equivalent proportion compared to that of 1990 (89.2%). The detailed distribution in 2018 was as follows: permanent crops (73.3%), heterogeneous agricultural areas (14.4%), urban areas (9%), shrub and/or herbaceous vegetation environments (2.8%), inland waters (Note: Inland waters refer to all surface waters, generally freshwater sourced from precipitation, that are located inland.) (0.5%). Changes in the commune’s land use and infrastructure can be observed on various cartographic representations of the area: the Cassini map (18th century), the military topographic map (1820–1866), and IGN maps or aerial photographs from 1950 to the present day.

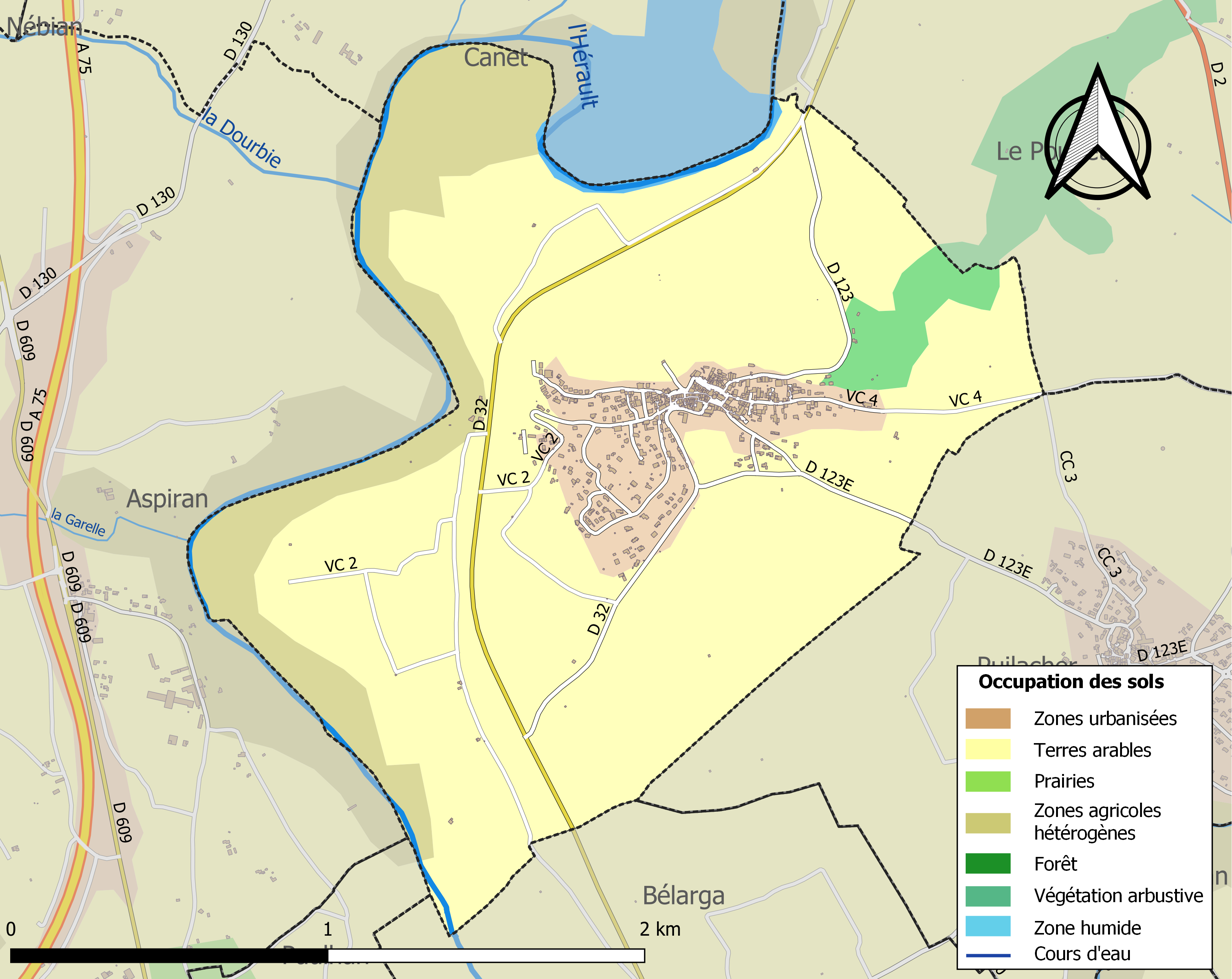
Map of Infrastructure and Land Use in the Commune in 2018 (CLC)

== Population ==
Historical population

Year	Pop.	±% p.a.
1793	437	—
1800	472	+1.11%
1806	516	+1.50%
1821	555	+0.49%
1831	535	−0.37%
1836	512	−0.87%
1841	504	−0.31%
1846	508	+0.16%
1851	525	+0.66%
1856	513	−0.46%
1861	503	−0.39%
1866	461	−1.73%
1872	456	−0.18%
1876	462	+0.33%
1881	458	−0.17%
1886	389	−3.21%
1891	506	+5.40%
1896	507	+0.04%
1901	531	+0.93%

Year	Pop.	±% p.a.
1906	512	−0.73%
1911	461	−2.08%
1921	516	+1.13%
1926	515	−0.04%
1931	585	+2.58%
1936	553	−1.12%
1946	503	−0.94%
1954	450	−1.38%
1962	465	+0.41%
1968	386	−3.06%
1975	318	−2.73%
1982	303	−0.69%
1990	299	−0.17%
1999	402	+3.34%
2007	489	+2.48%
2012	572	+3.19%
2017	659	+2.87%
2023	683	+0.60%

Source: Ldh/EHESS/Cassini until 1999, and INSEE since 2007.

== Notable people born in Tressan ==
- Louis de La Vergne-Montenard de Tressan

== See also ==
- Communes of the Hérault department
