= Lagamas =

- Commune
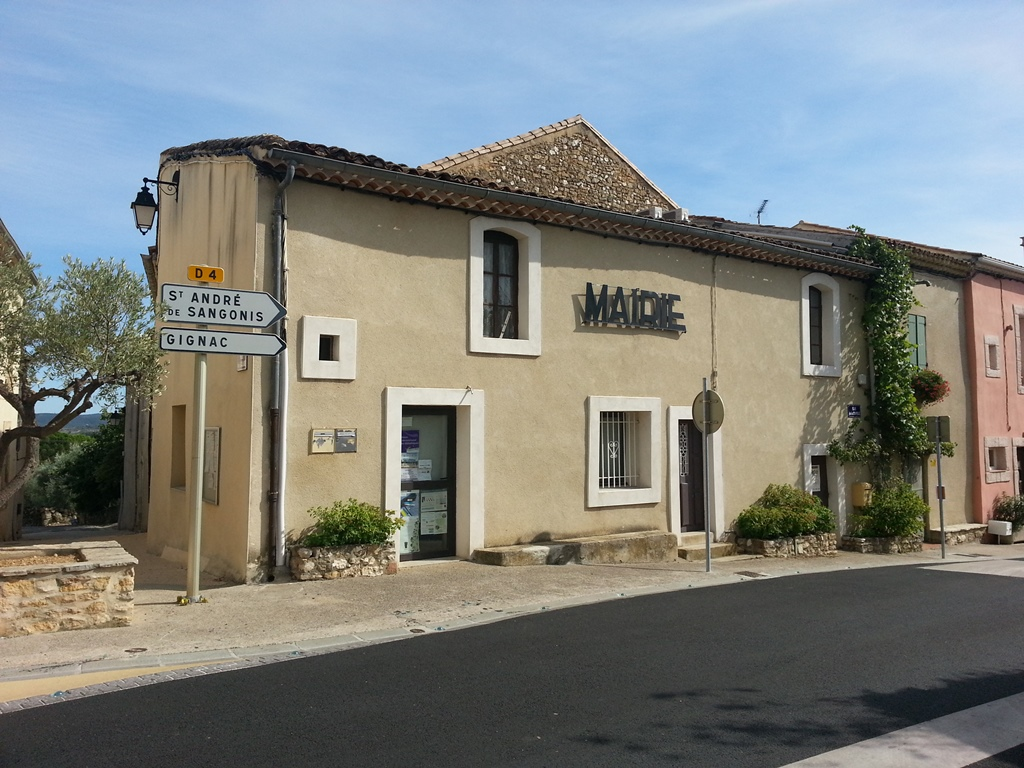
- The town hall

- Coat of arms
- Location of Lagamas
- Location within France Location within Occitanie
- Coordinates: 43°40′29″N 3°31′26″E
- Country: France
- Region: Occitania
- Department: Hérault
- Arrondissement: Lodève
- Canton: Gignac
- Intercommunality: Vallée de l'Hérault

Government
  - Mayor (2020–2026): Christian Viloing
- Area^{1}: 4.52 km^{2} (1.75 sq mi)
- Elevation: 40 m (130 ft)
- Highest elevation: 142 m (466 ft)
- Lowest elevation: 33 m (108 ft)
- Population (2023): 111
  - Density: 24.6/km^{2} (63.6/sq mi)
- Time zone: UTC+01:00 (CET)
  - Summer (DST): UTC+02:00 (CEST)
- INSEE/Postal code: 34125 /34150
- ^{1} French Land Register data, which excludes lakes, ponds, glaciers > 1 km^{2} (0.386 sq mi or 247 acres) and river estuaries.

Lagamas (Occitan: L'Agamàs) is a commune in the Hérault département in the Occitanie region in southern France.

== Geography ==
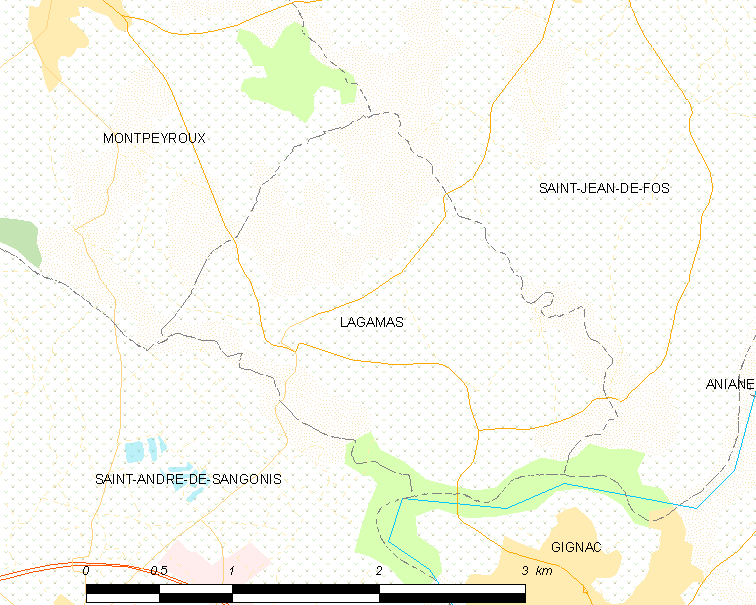
Map

This commune is located in the Languedoc-Roussillon region, in the Hérault département, in the canton of Gignac. The village is part of the Hérault's 4th constituency.

=== Climate ===
In 2010, the climate of the commune is classified as a frank Mediterranean climate, according to a study based on a dataset covering the 1971-2000 period. In 2020, Météo-France published a typology of climates in mainland France in which the commune is exposed to a Mediterranean climate and is part of the Provence, Languedoc-Roussillon climatic region, characterised by low rainfall in summer, very good sunshine (2,600 h/year), a hot summer 21.5 °C (71 °F), very dry air in summer, dry conditions in all seasons, strong winds (frequency of 40 to 50% of winds > 5 m/s), and little fog.

For the 1971-2000 period, the average annual temperature was 14.3 °C (58 °F) with an annual atmospheric temperature of 16.5 °C (62 °F). The average annual total rainfall during this period was 849 mm, with 6.8 days of precipitation in January and 3.1 days in July. For the subsequent period of 1991 to 2020, the average annual temperature observed at the nearest weather station, located in the commune of Saint-André-de-Sangonis, 3 kilometres (2 mi) away as the crow flies, is 15.5 °C (60 °F) and the average annual total rainfall is 652.4 mm.

For the future, climate parameters for the commune projected for 2050, based on different greenhouse gas emission scenarios, can be consulted on a dedicated website published by Météo-France in November 2022.

== Urbanism ==
=== Land use ===
The commune's land use, as revealed by the European biophysical land cover database Corine Land Cover (CLC), is characterised by the importance of agricultural land (96.9% in 2018), an increase compared to 1990 (77%). The detailed breakdown in 2018 is as follows: permanent crops (56.5%), heterogeneous agricultural areas (40.4%), forests (3%). Changes in land use in the municipality and its infrastructure can be seen on various maps of the area: the Cassini map (eighteenth century), the carte d'état-major (1820-1866) and IGN maps or aerial photos for the current period (1950 to the present).

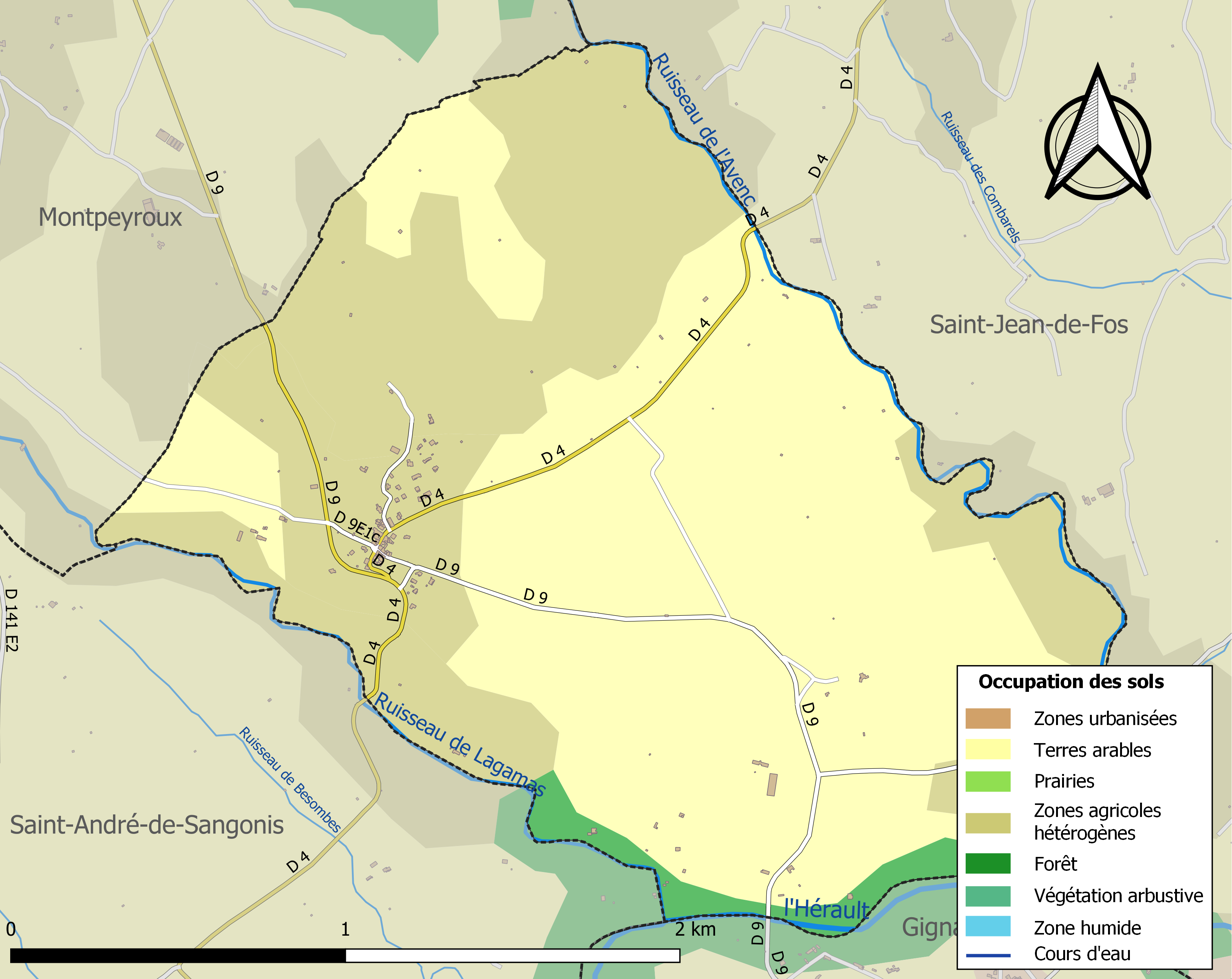
Map of infrastructure and land use in the commune in 2018 (CLC)

== Population ==
Historical population

Year	Pop.	±% p.a.
1793	60	—
1800	72	+2.64%
1806	67	−1.19%
1821	120	+3.96%
1831	63	−6.24%
1836	68	+1.54%
1841	78	+2.78%
1846	70	−2.14%
1851	71	+0.28%
1856	78	+1.90%
1861	70	−2.14%
1866	87	+4.44%
1872	66	−4.50%
1876	73	+2.55%
1881	71	−0.55%
1886	59	−3.64%
1891	60	+0.34%
1896	70	+3.13%
1901	71	+0.28%

Year	Pop.	±% p.a.
1906	65	−1.75%
1911	64	−0.31%
1921	74	+1.46%
1926	73	−0.27%
1931	78	+1.33%
1936	65	−3.58%
1946	41	−4.50%
1954	62	+5.31%
1962	61	−0.20%
1968	46	−4.59%
1975	43	−0.96%
1982	56	+3.85%
1990	71	+3.01%
1999	111	+5.09%
2007	123	+1.29%
2012	110	−2.21%
2017	111	+0.18%
2023	111	+0.00%

Source: Ldh/EHESS/Cassini until 1999, and INSEE since 2007.

== Architecture ==
The church, Notre-Dame de la Garrigue, was built by Élodie Martin, the widow of the textile magnate Jean-Pierre Balsan as a homage to her husband. The Balsan family is known to have inhabited Lagamas since at least 1576. The church, with its unusual gothic style, is a miniature inspired by the Châteauroux cathedral, a city where the Balsan family had acquired the Manufacture Royale de Drap de Châteauroux in 1856.

The church was completed in around 1874. An extensive renovation was finalised in 2007.

The same widow built the large mansion facing the church, known locally as the château. It hosts an annual multi-disciplinary artist residency organised by the Cornelius Arts Foundation.

== See also ==
- Communes of the Hérault department
