= Campagnan =

- Commune
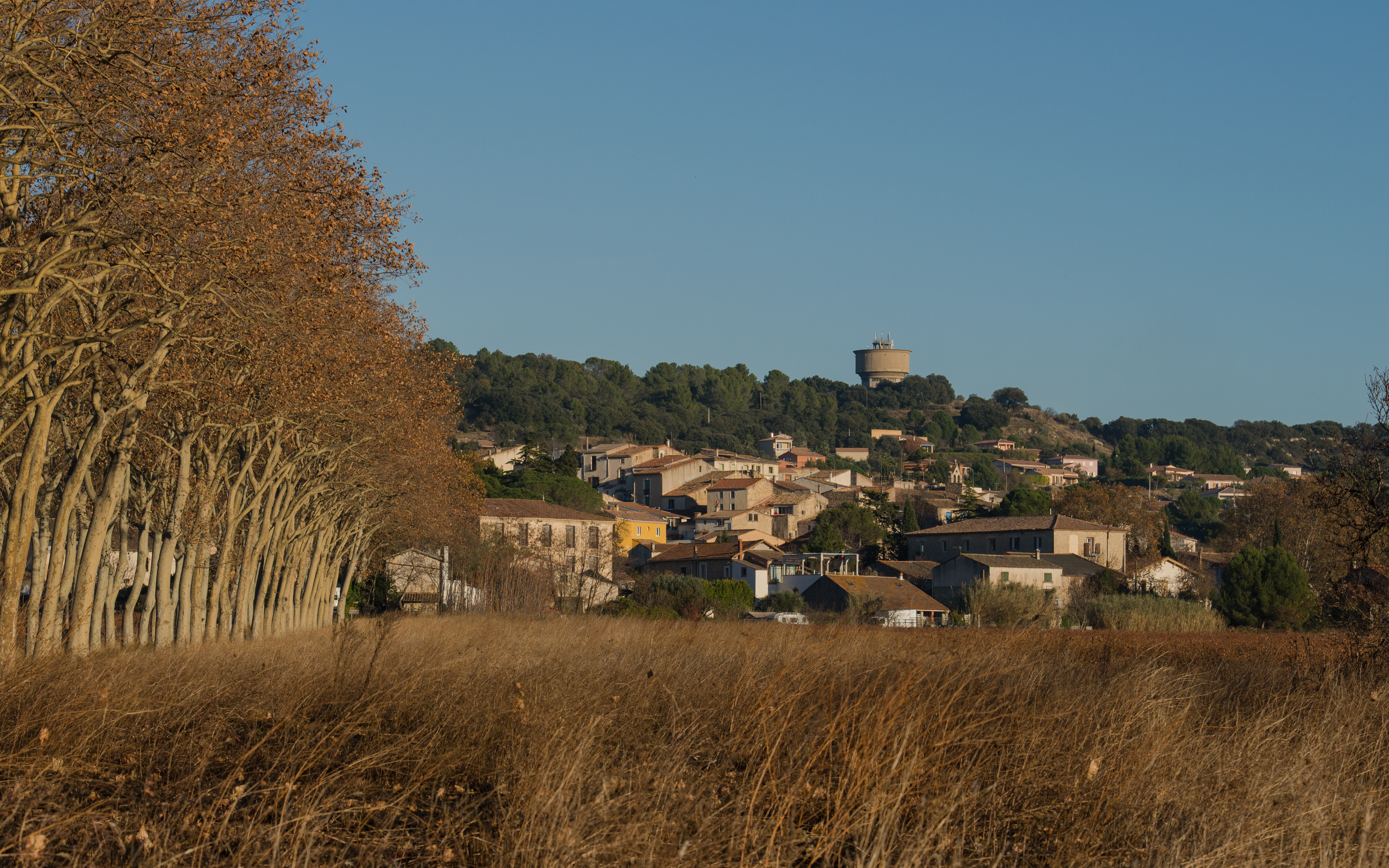
- A general view of Campagnan

- Coat of arms
- Location of Campagnan
- Location within France Location within Occitanie
- Coordinates: 43°32′18″N 3°29′55″E
- Country: France
- Region: Occitania
- Department: Hérault
- Arrondissement: Lodève
- Canton: Gignac
- Intercommunality: Vallée de l'Hérault

Government
  - Mayor (2020–2026): Jean-Marc Isure
- Area^{1}: 3.75 km^{2} (1.45 sq mi)
- Elevation: 32 m (105 ft)
- Highest elevation: 123 m (404 ft)
- Lowest elevation: 18 m (59 ft)
- Population (2023): 714
  - Density: 190/km^{2} (493/sq mi)
- Time zone: UTC+01:00 (CET)
  - Summer (DST): UTC+02:00 (CEST)
- INSEE/Postal code: 34047 /34230
- ^{1} French Land Register data, which excludes lakes, ponds, glaciers > 1 km^{2} (0.386 sq mi or 247 acres) and river estuaries.

Campagnan (French pronunciation: [kɑ̃paɲɑ̃]; Occitan: Campanhan) is a commune situated in the Hérault Department of Southern France.

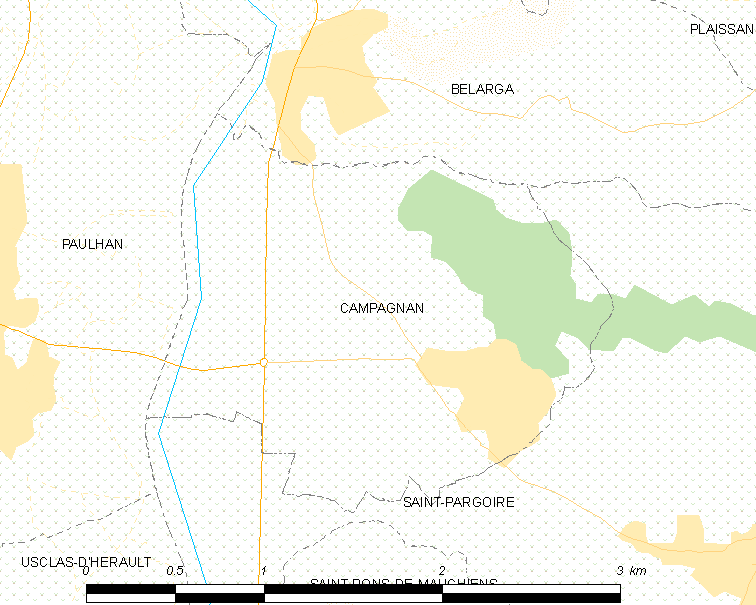
Map

== History ==
During the French Revolution, the citizens of the commune met within the revolutionary society, named "popular society of mountain sans-culottes" in Floréal year II. In addition, some inhabitants of Campagnan frequented the neighbouring society of Saint-Pargoire.

In the 14th century, the village formed a fortified square centered on the church. In the 17th century, a ball court was established outside the fortified walls. In the 18th and 19th centuries, houses were built using limestone rubble and plaster. The roofs were long and sloping, with lean-tos, and covered with hollow tiles.

In the 19th century, with the arrival of the railway and the station, a suburb was created to the south of the village.

Thanks to the vineyard and the train station, commercial activity in Campagnan is developing.

== Population ==
Historical population
Year	Pop.	±% p.a.
1968	310	—
1975	303	−0.33%
1982	319	+0.74%
1990	329	+0.39%
1999	391	+1.94%
2007	520	+3.63%
2012	609	+3.21%
2017	674	+2.05%
2023	714	+0.97%
Source: INSEE

== See also ==
- Communes of the Hérault department
