= Louis de La Vergne-Montenard de Tressan =

French cleric (1670–1733)

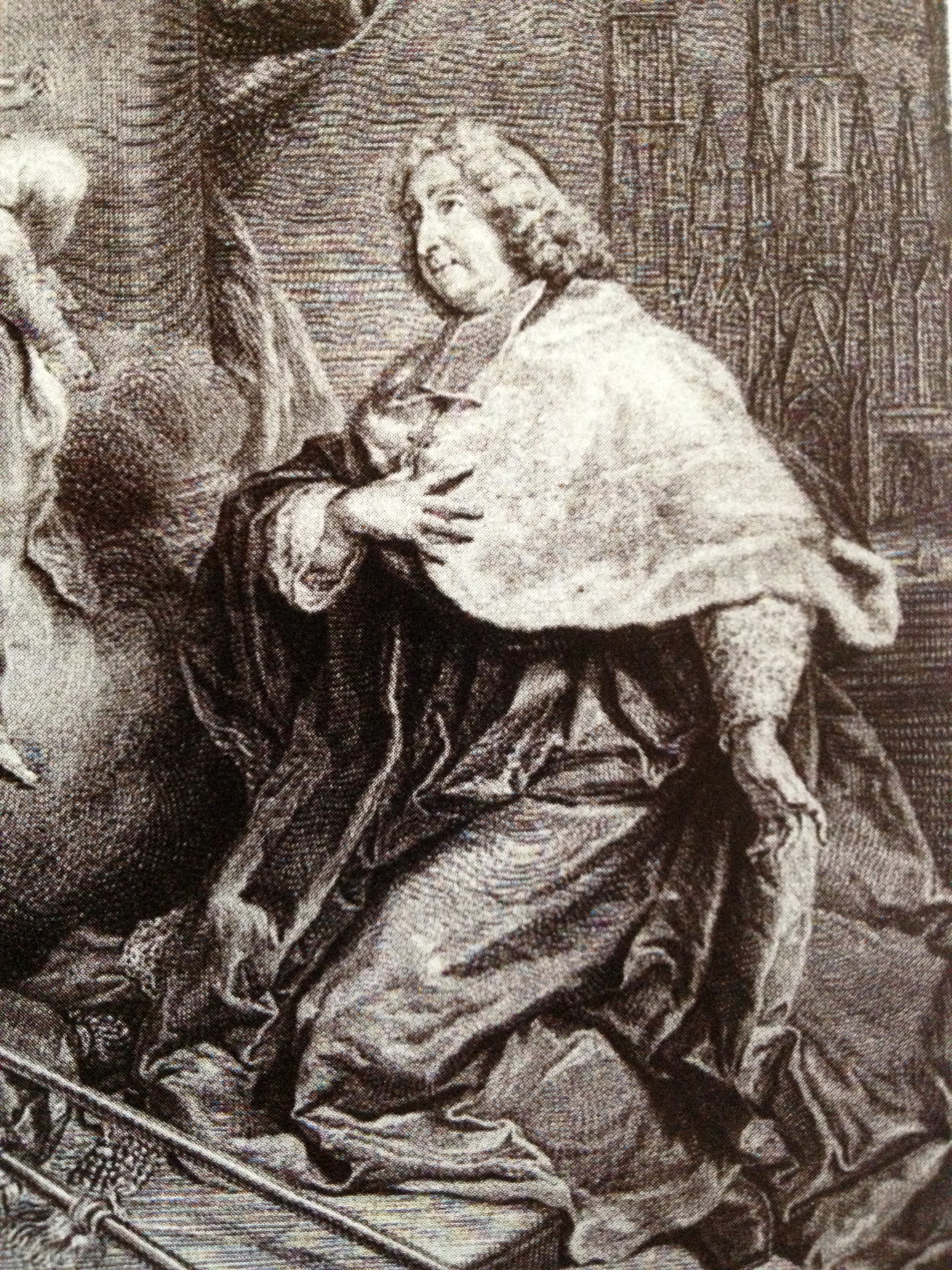
Louis de La Vergne-Montenard de Tressan

Louis de La Vergne-Montenard de Tressan, also known as Louis III de La Vergne de Tressan (1670 – 18 April 1733), was a French cleric of the Catholic Church and Archbishop of Rouen, France between 1723 and 1733.

== Biography ==
He was born in Tressan (France) in 1670. He was the second son of Jérémie de Tressan, and his paternal family was the historical Languedoc family. His father, a Maréchal de camp of Louis XIV, married Marguerite de Béon (House of Béon-Luxembourg) on 1 March 1667. His brother was François de La Vergne, Marquess of Tressan.

Louis de La Vergne de Tressan received a licence in theology from the University of Paris. He was Count of Lyon and Canon of the Saint John the Baptist Lyon Cathedral, then First Almoner of Philippe I, Duke of Orléans. In this capacity he advocated renewed persecution of Huguenots, which became law under Louis Henri, Duke of Bourbon.

He was selected Bishop of Nantes (France) on 2 October 1717, confirmed on 18 June 1718 and ordained on 10 July 1718. He stayed in Nantes from 2 October 1717 to 14 February 1724. He was selected Metropolitan Archbishop of Rouen on 17 October 1723 and confirmed on 14 February 1724. He died on 18 April 1733 in Rouen and was succeeded by Nicolas de Saulx de Tavannes, Bishop of Châlons-en-Champagne. His appointed surgeon in Rouen was Claude-Nicolas Le Cat.
