= Saint-Guiraud =

- Commune
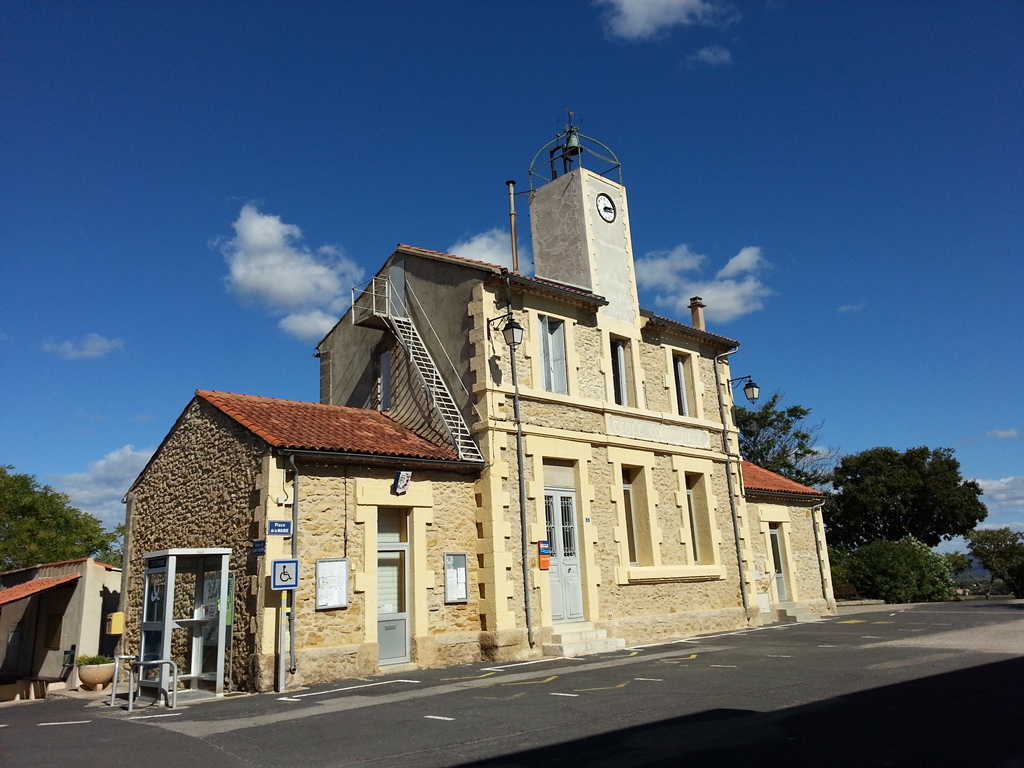
- Town hall
- Location of Saint-Guiraud
- Location within France Location within Occitanie
- Coordinates: 43°40′39″N 3°27′19″E
- Country: France
- Region: Occitania
- Department: Hérault
- Arrondissement: Lodève
- Canton: Gignac
- Intercommunality: Vallée de l'Hérault

Government
  - Mayor (2020–2026): Daniel Requirand
- Area^{1}: 6.07 km^{2} (2.34 sq mi)
- Elevation: 105 m (344 ft)
- Highest elevation: 289 m (948 ft)
- Lowest elevation: 69 m (226 ft)
- Population (2023): 267
  - Density: 44.0/km^{2} (114/sq mi)
- Time zone: UTC+01:00 (CET)
  - Summer (DST): UTC+02:00 (CEST)
- INSEE/Postal code: 34262 /34725
- ^{1} French Land Register data, which excludes lakes, ponds, glaciers > 1 km^{2} (0.386 sq mi or 247 acres) and river estuaries.

Saint-Guiraud (French pronunciation: [sɛ̃ ɡiʁo]; Languedocien: Sant Guiraud) is a commune in the Hérault department in the Occitanie region in southern France.

== Population ==
Historical population
Year	Pop.	±% p.a.
1968	126	—
1975	110	−1.92%
1982	128	+2.19%
1990	171	+3.69%
1999	184	+0.82%
2007	220	+2.26%
2012	210	−0.93%
2017	221	+1.03%
2023	267	+3.20%
Source: INSEE

== See also ==
- Communes of the Hérault department
