= Argelliers =

- Commune
- Coat of arms
- Location of Argelliers
- Location within France Location within Occitanie
- Coordinates: 43°41′55″N 3°40′29″E
- Country: France
- Region: Occitania
- Department: Hérault
- Arrondissement: Lodève
- Canton: Gignac
- Intercommunality: CC Vallée Hérault

Government
  - Mayor (2020–2026): Pierre Amalou
- Area^{1}: 50.29 km^{2} (19.42 sq mi)
- Elevation: 230 m (750 ft)
- Highest elevation: 531 m (1,742 ft)
- Lowest elevation: 80 m (260 ft)
- Population (2023): 1,002
  - Density: 19.92/km^{2} (51.60/sq mi)
- Time zone: UTC+01:00 (CET)
  - Summer (DST): UTC+02:00 (CEST)
- INSEE/Postal code: 34012 /34380
- ^{1} French Land Register data, which excludes lakes, ponds, glaciers > 1 km^{2} (0.386 sq mi or 247 acres) and river estuaries.

Argelliers (French pronunciation: [aʁʒɛlje]; Occitan: Argelièrs) is a commune in the Hérault department in southern France.

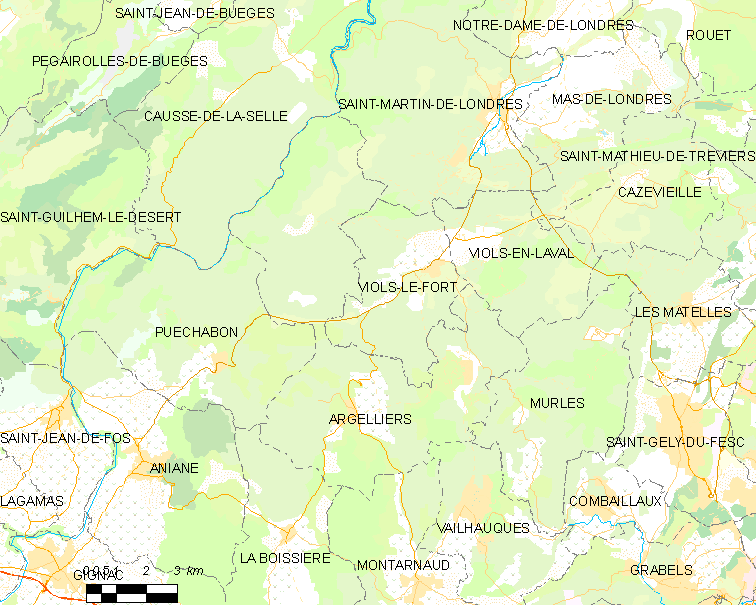
Map

== See also ==
- Communes of the Hérault department
