= Canton of Gignac =

Coordinates: 43°37′25″N 3°30′59″E

Gignac
- Canton
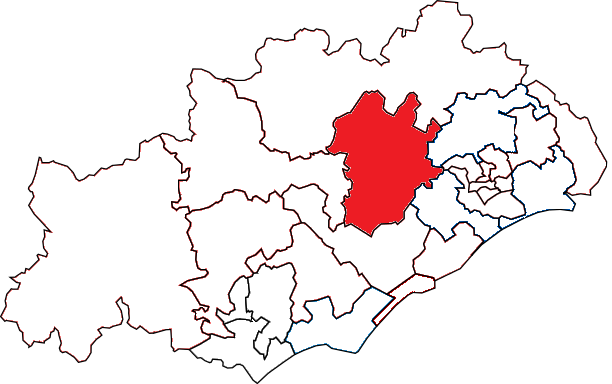
- Interactive map of Gignac
- Country: France
- Region: Occitania
- Department: Hérault
- No. of communes: {{{nbcomm}}}

Government
  - Representatives (2021–2028): Nicole Morere; Jean-François Soto
- Area: 481.04 km^{2} (185.73 sq mi)
- Population (2023): 42,163
  - Density: 87.650/km^{2} (227.01/sq mi)
- INSEE code: 34 09

The canton of Gignac is an administrative division of the Hérault department, southern France. Its borders were modified at the French canton reorganisation which came into effect in March 2015. Its seat is in Gignac.

== Composition ==
It consists of the following communes:

- Aniane
- Arboras
- Argelliers
- Aumelas
- Bélarga
- La Boissière
- Campagnan
- Gignac
- Jonquières
- Lagamas
- Montarnaud
- Montpeyroux
- Plaissan
- Popian
- Le Pouget
- Pouzols
- Puéchabon
- Puilacher
- Saint-André-de-Sangonis
- Saint-Bauzille-de-la-Sylve
- Saint-Guilhem-le-Désert
- Saint-Guiraud
- Saint-Jean-de-Fos
- Saint-Pargoire
- Saint-Paul-et-Valmalle
- Saint-Saturnin-de-Lucian
- Tressan
- Vendémian

== Councillors ==
Election	Councillors	Party	Occupation
2015	Nicole Morere	DVG	Councillor of Aniane
2015-2017	Louis Villaret	DVG	Mayor of Le Pouget
2017	Jean-François Soto	DVG	Mayor of Gignac

On January 29, 2017, Louis Villaret announces his resignation from his mandate as departmental councillors. He is replaced by his substitute, Jean-François Soto.

== Pictures of the canton ==
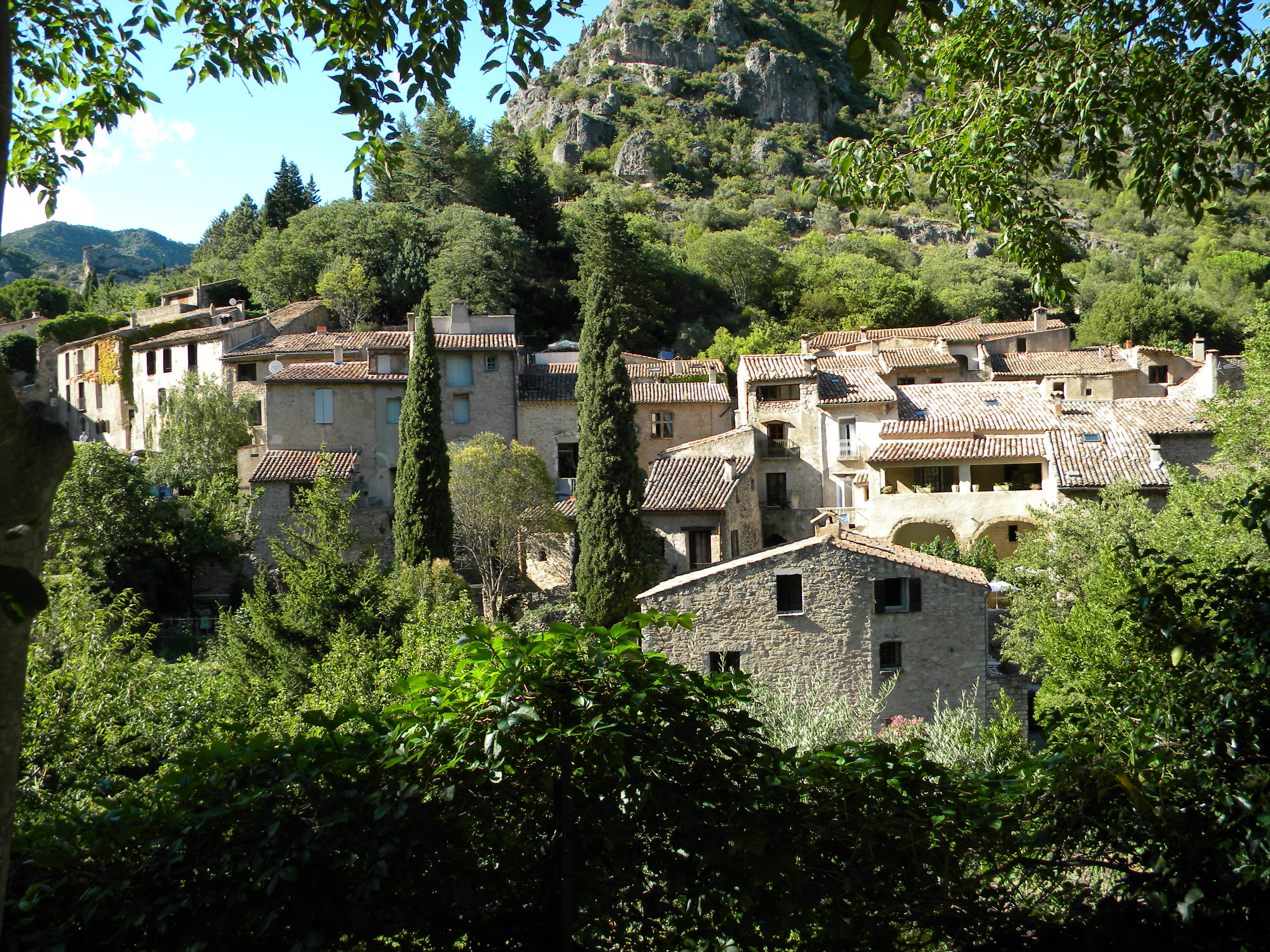
View of Saint-Guilhem-le-Désert

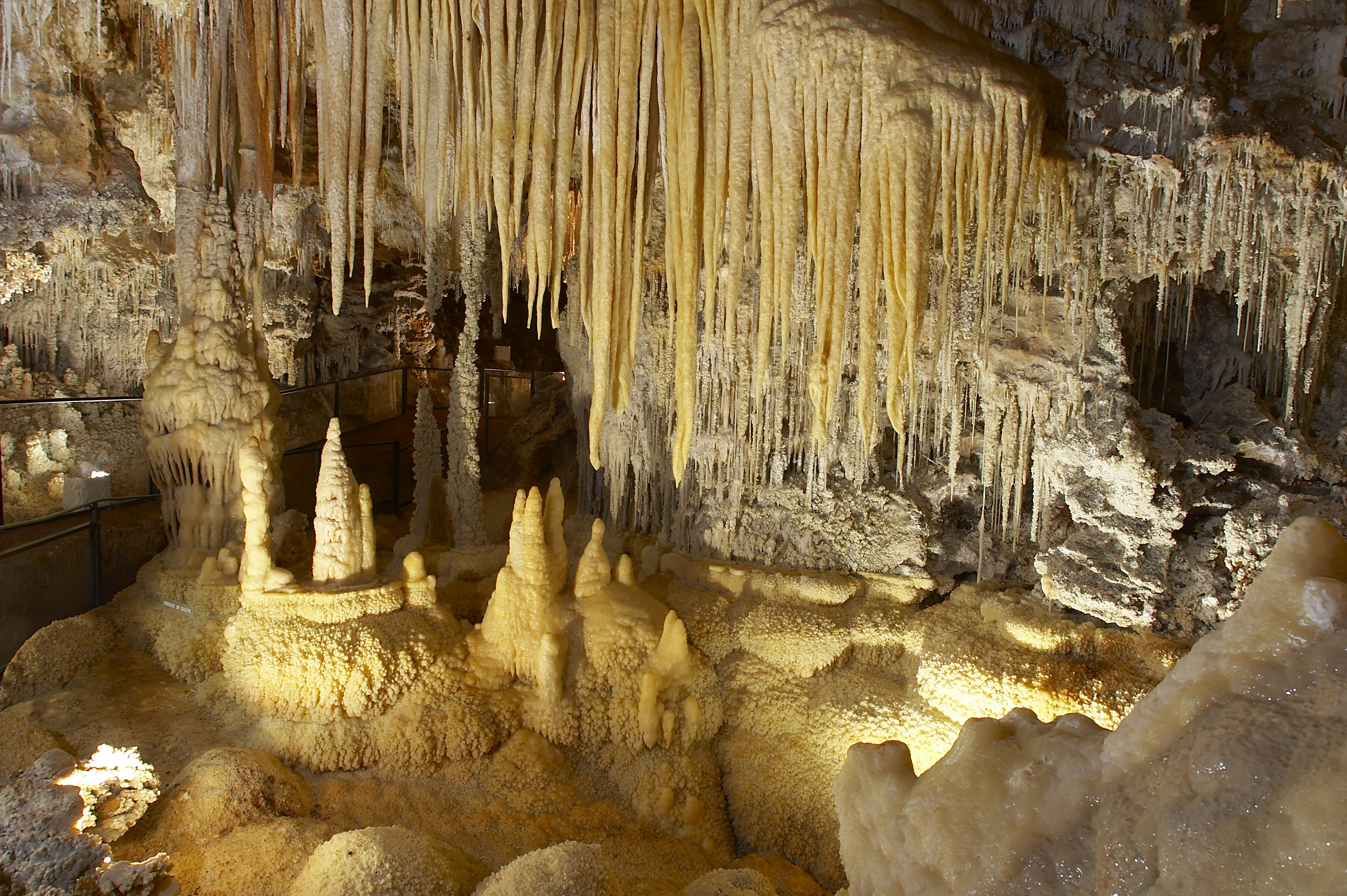
Grotte de Clamouse in Saint-Jean-de-Fos

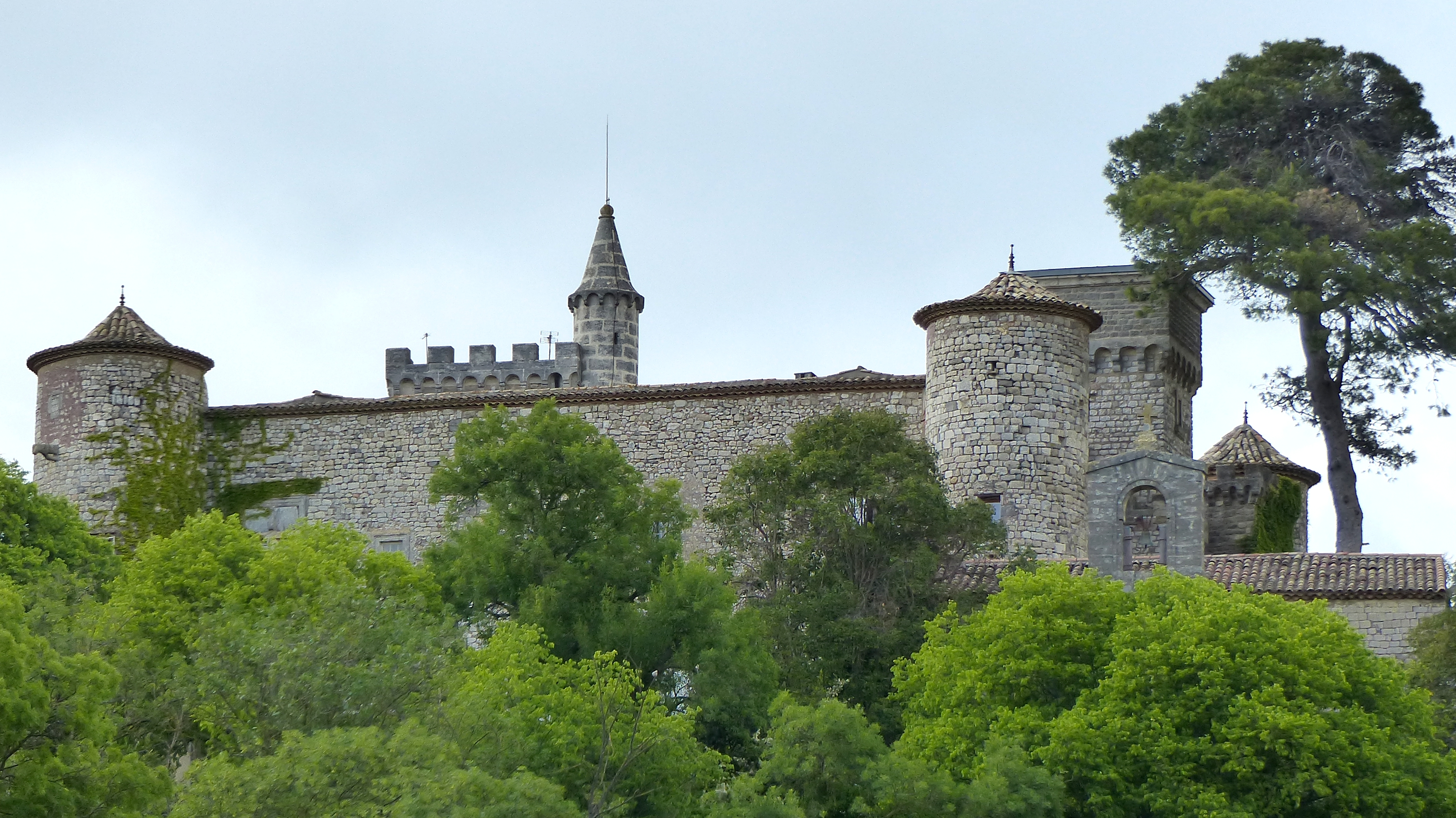
Montarnaud Castle
