= Arboras =

- Commune
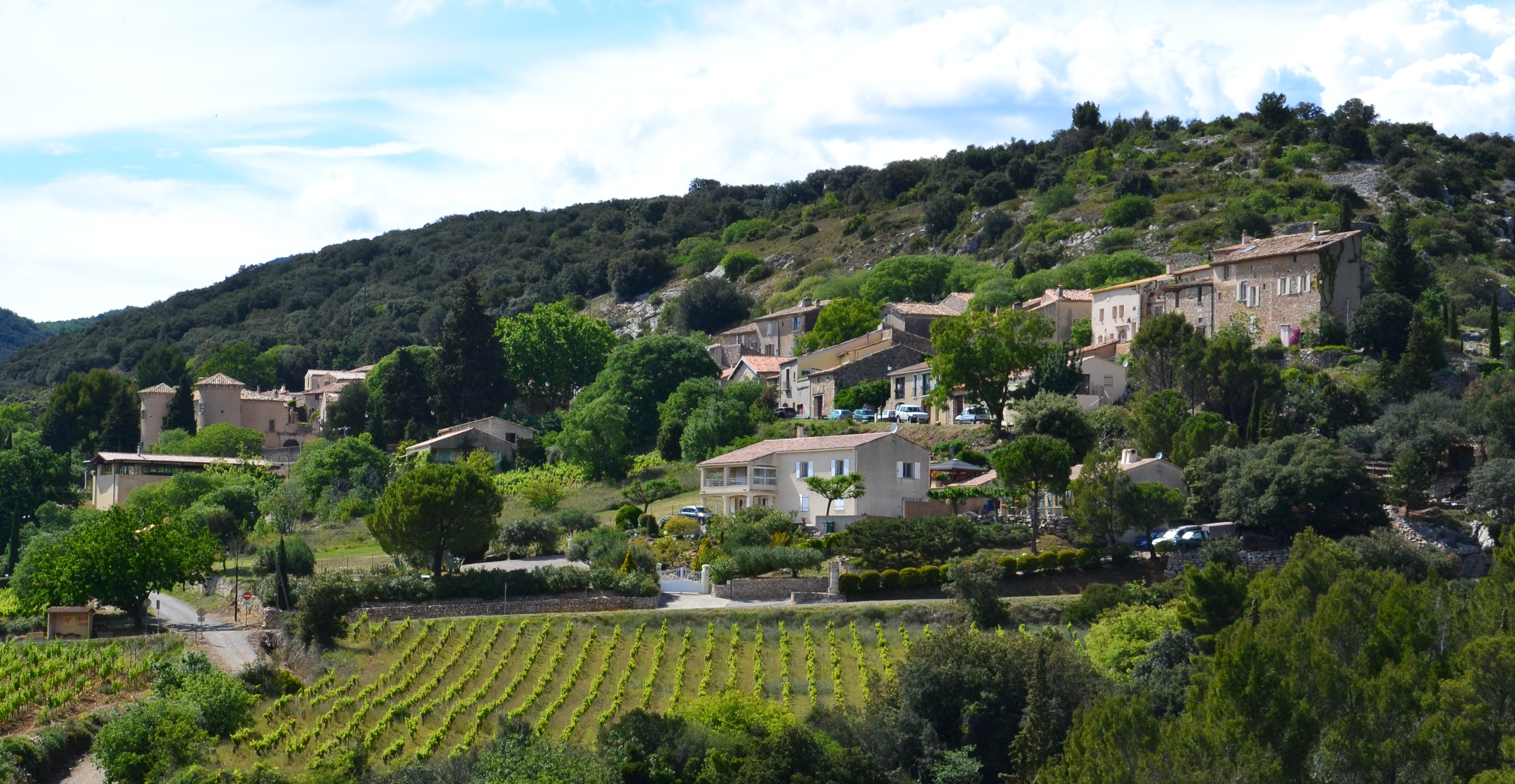
- A general view of Arboras

- Coat of arms
- Location of Arboras
- Location within France Location within Occitanie
- Coordinates: 43°42′42″N 3°29′08″E
- Country: France
- Region: Occitania
- Department: Hérault
- Arrondissement: Lodève
- Canton: Gignac
- Intercommunality: Vallée de l'Hérault

Government
  - Mayor (2020–2026): Marie-Françoise Nachez
- Area^{1}: 6.73 km^{2} (2.60 sq mi)
- Elevation: 204 m (669 ft)
- Highest elevation: 702 m (2,303 ft)
- Lowest elevation: 137 m (449 ft)
- Population (2023): 107
  - Density: 15.9/km^{2} (41.2/sq mi)
- Time zone: UTC+01:00 (CET)
  - Summer (DST): UTC+02:00 (CEST)
- INSEE/Postal code: 34011 /34150
- ^{1} French Land Register data, which excludes lakes, ponds, glaciers > 1 km^{2} (0.386 sq mi or 247 acres) and river estuaries.

Arboras (Arboràs in Occitan) is a commune in the Hérault department in southern France.

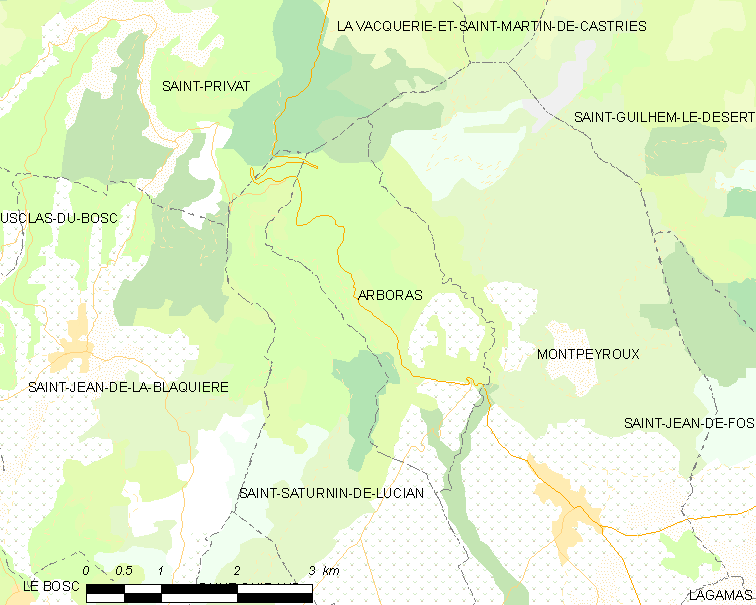
Map

== Population ==
Historical population
| Year | Pop. | ±% p.a. |
|---|---|---|
| 1968 | 69 | — |
| 1975 | 82 | +2.50% |
| 1982 | 62 | −3.92% |
| 1990 | 69 | +1.35% |
| 1999 | 74 | +0.78% |
| 2007 | 88 | +2.19% |
| 2012 | 107 | +3.99% |
| 2017 | 121 | +2.49% |
| 2023 | 107 | −2.03% |
Source: INSEE

== See also ==
- Communes of the Hérault department
