= Montarnaud =

- Commune
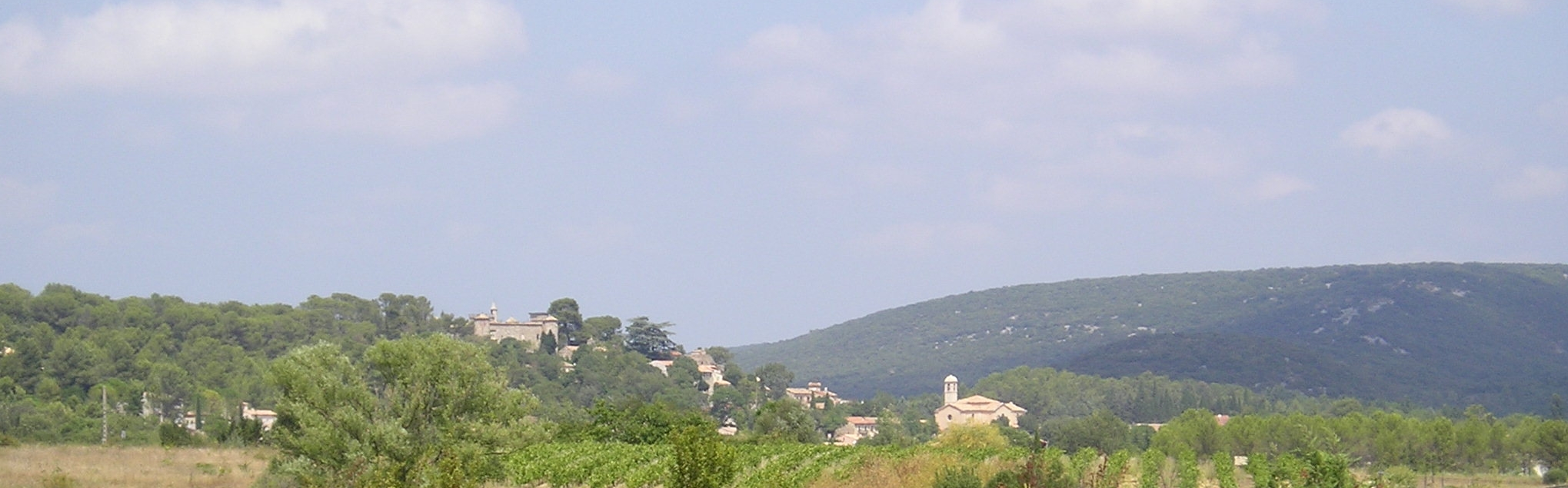
- Château and the nineteenth century church.

- Coat of arms
- Location of Montarnaud
- Location within France Location within Occitanie
- Coordinates: 43°39′00″N 3°41′59″E
- Country: France
- Region: Occitania
- Department: Hérault
- Arrondissement: Lodève
- Canton: Gignac
- Intercommunality: Vallée de l'Hérault

Government
  - Mayor (2020–2026): Jean-Pierre Pugens
- Area^{1}: 27.53 km^{2} (10.63 sq mi)
- Highest elevation: 315 m (1,033 ft)
- Lowest elevation: 95 m (312 ft)
- Population (2023): 4,208
  - Density: 152.9/km^{2} (395.9/sq mi)
- Time zone: UTC+01:00 (CET)
  - Summer (DST): UTC+02:00 (CEST)
- INSEE/Postal code: 34163 /34570
- ^{1} French Land Register data, which excludes lakes, ponds, glaciers > 1 km^{2} (0.386 sq mi or 247 acres) and river estuaries.

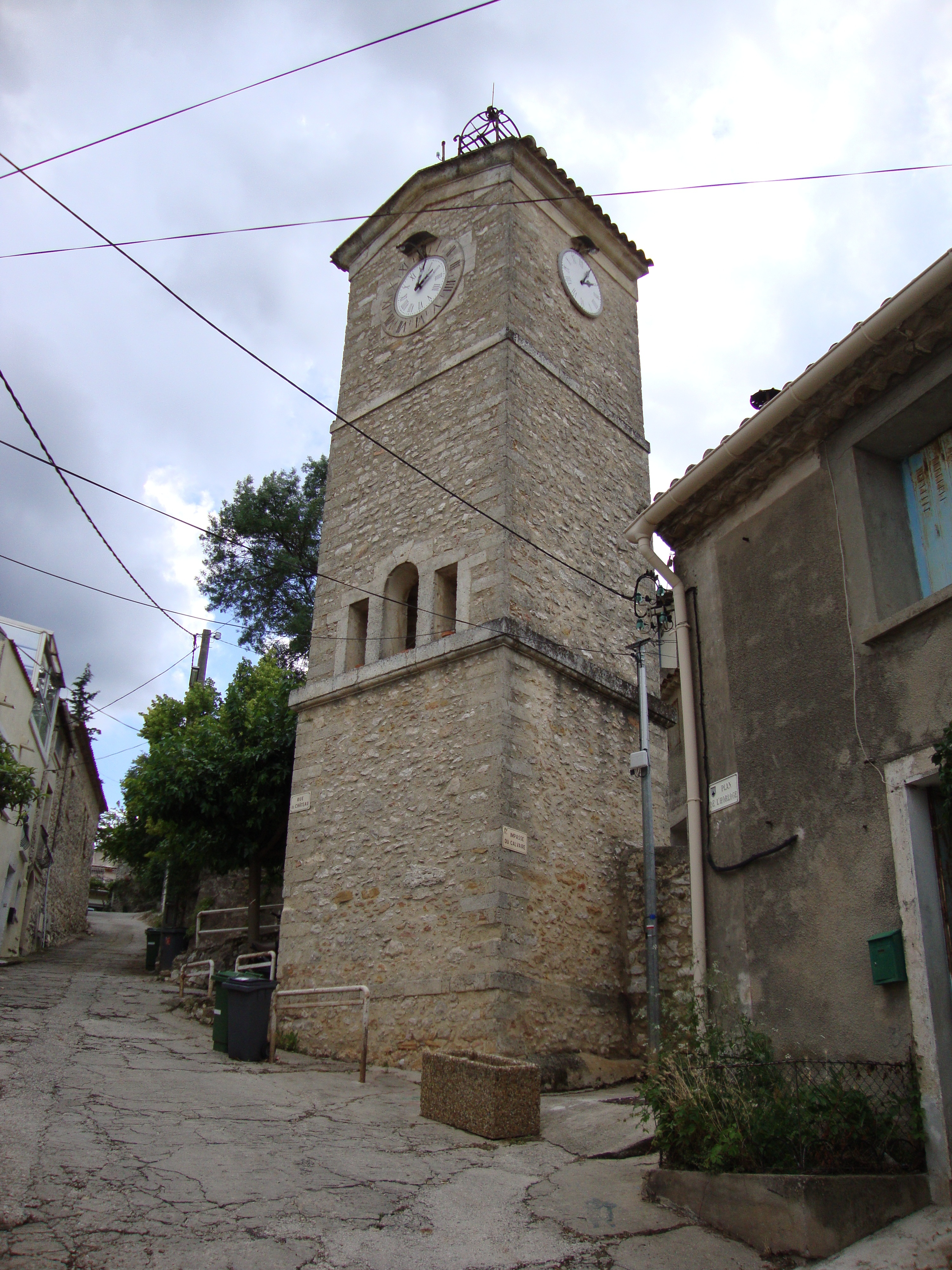
The location

Montarnaud (French pronunciation: [mɔ̃taʁno]) is a commune in the Hérault department in the Occitanie region in southern France.

== Geography ==
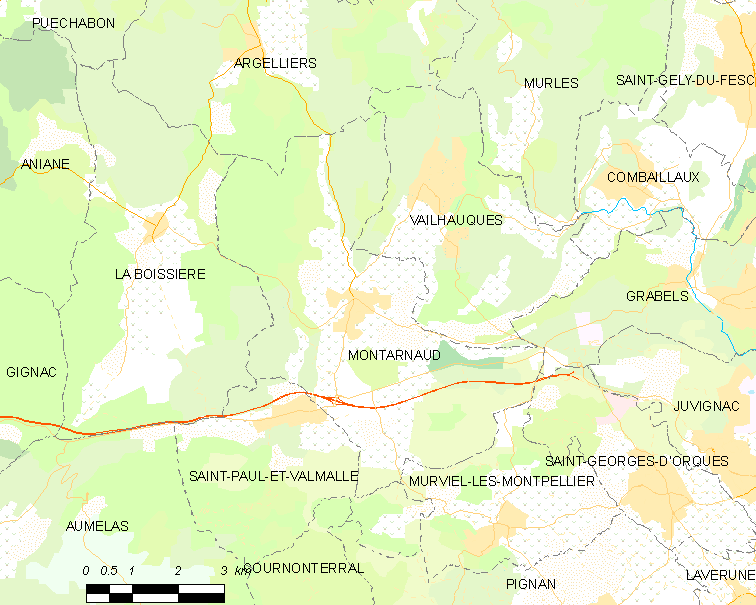
Map

=== Climate ===
Montarnaud has a mediterranean climate (Köppen climate classification Csa). The average annual temperature in Montarnaud is 14.1 °C (57.4 °F). The average annual rainfall is 869.9 mm (34.25 in) with October as the wettest month. The temperatures are highest on average in July, at around 23.2 °C (73.8 °F), and lowest in January, at around 6.4 °C (43.5 °F). The highest temperature ever recorded in Montarnaud was 44.1 °C (111.4 °F) on 28 June 2019; the coldest temperature ever recorded was −15.0 °C (5.0 °F) on 16 January 1985.

Climate data for Montarnaud (1981–2010 averages, extremes 1980−present)
Month	Jan	Feb	Mar	Apr	May	Jun	Jul	Aug	Sep	Oct	Nov	Dec	Year
Record high °C (°F)	21.0 (69.8)	24.3 (75.7)	29.5 (85.1)	29.1 (84.4)	34.0 (93.2)	44.1 (111.4)	40.5 (104.9)	41.5 (106.7)	34.8 (94.6)	33.0 (91.4)	23.8 (74.8)	21.2 (70.2)	44.1 (111.4)
Mean daily maximum °C (°F)	11.4 (52.5)	12.3 (54.1)	15.7 (60.3)	18.0 (64.4)	21.9 (71.4)	26.7 (80.1)	30.1 (86.2)	29.7 (85.5)	25.1 (77.2)	19.8 (67.6)	14.5 (58.1)	11.7 (53.1)	19.8 (67.6)
Daily mean °C (°F)	6.4 (43.5)	6.9 (44.4)	9.9 (49.8)	12.4 (54.3)	16.0 (60.8)	20.3 (68.5)	23.2 (73.8)	22.8 (73.0)	18.9 (66.0)	15.0 (59.0)	9.8 (49.6)	7.0 (44.6)	14.1 (57.4)
Mean daily minimum °C (°F)	1.4 (34.5)	1.5 (34.7)	4.1 (39.4)	6.7 (44.1)	10.2 (50.4)	13.8 (56.8)	16.3 (61.3)	15.9 (60.6)	12.6 (54.7)	10.1 (50.2)	5.1 (41.2)	2.2 (36.0)	8.4 (47.1)
Record low °C (°F)	−15.0 (5.0)	−11.2 (11.8)	−9.0 (15.8)	−4.0 (24.8)	0.5 (32.9)	3.0 (37.4)	5.5 (41.9)	5.5 (41.9)	2.5 (36.5)	−5.0 (23.0)	−8.5 (16.7)	−12.0 (10.4)	−15.0 (5.0)
Average precipitation mm (inches)	80.5 (3.17)	65.2 (2.57)	43.6 (1.72)	71.1 (2.80)	62.7 (2.47)	40.6 (1.60)	26.3 (1.04)	39.5 (1.56)	98.2 (3.87)	132.1 (5.20)	103.5 (4.07)	106.6 (4.20)	869.9 (34.25)
Average precipitation days (≥ 1.0 mm)	6.5	5.2	5.3	6.1	6.5	4.6	2.6	4.1	4.9	7.6	7.2	6.7	67.3
Source: Meteociel

== Population ==
Historical population
Year	Pop.	±% p.a.
1968	602	—
1975	675	+1.65%
1982	1,016	+6.02%
1990	1,689	+6.56%
1999	2,350	+3.74%
2007	2,466	+0.60%
2012	2,553	+0.70%
2017	3,754	+8.02%
2023	4,208	+1.92%
Source: INSEE

== See also ==
- Communes of the Hérault department
