= La Boissière, Hérault =

La Boissière
- Commune
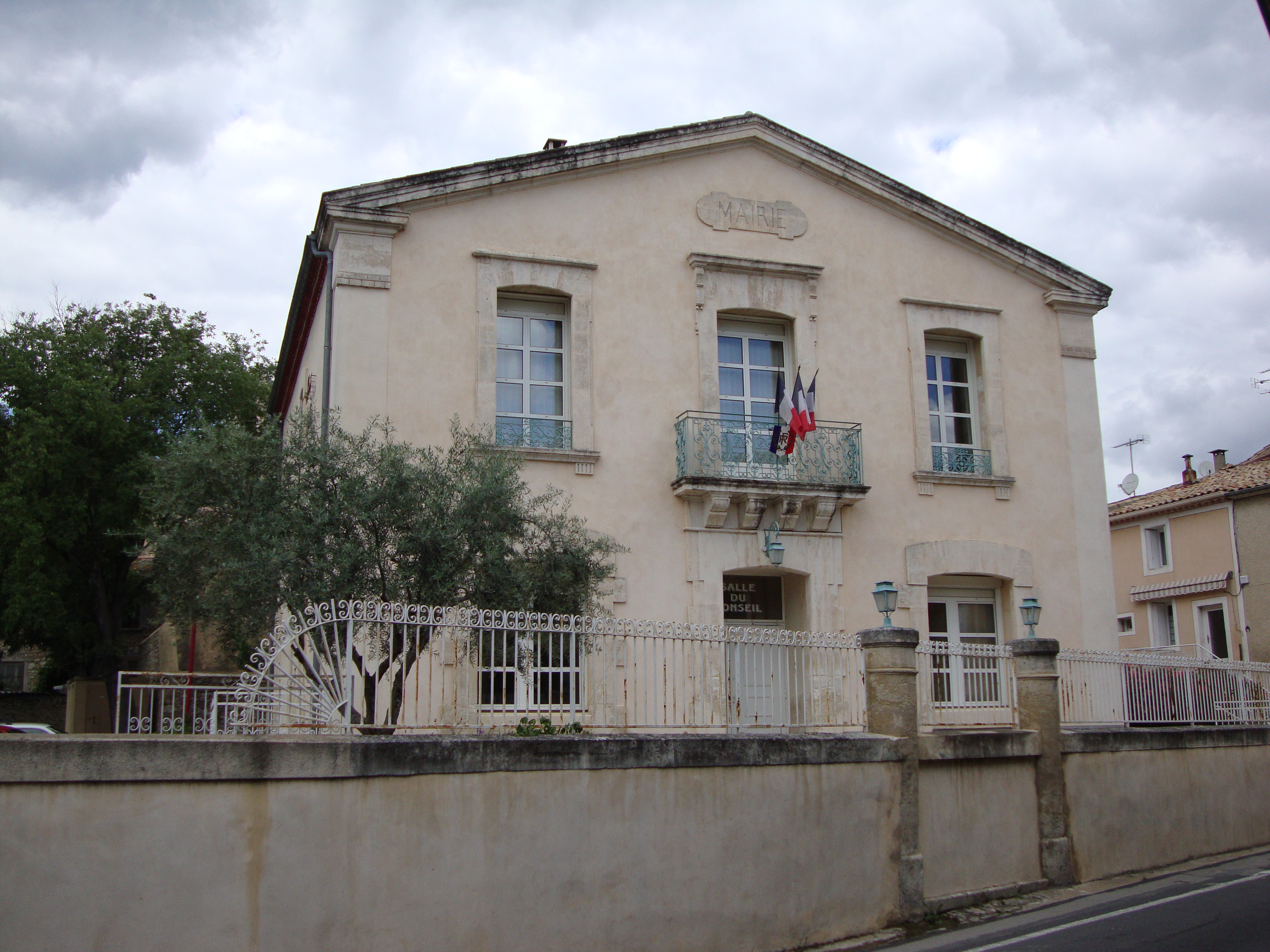
- Town hall

- Coat of arms
- Location of La Boissière
- Location within France Location within Occitanie
- Coordinates: 43°39′53″N 3°38′45″E
- Country: France
- Region: Occitania
- Department: Hérault
- Arrondissement: Lodève
- Canton: Gignac
- Intercommunality: Vallée de l'Hérault

Government
  - Mayor (2020–2026): Jean-Claude Cros
- Area^{1}: 24.45 km^{2} (9.44 sq mi)
- Elevation: 138 m (453 ft)
- Highest elevation: 367 m (1,204 ft)
- Lowest elevation: 136 m (446 ft)
- Population (2023): 1,072
  - Density: 43.84/km^{2} (113.6/sq mi)
- Time zone: UTC+01:00 (CET)
  - Summer (DST): UTC+02:00 (CEST)
- INSEE/Postal code: 34035 /34150
- ^{1} French Land Register data, which excludes lakes, ponds, glaciers > 1 km^{2} (0.386 sq mi or 247 acres) and river estuaries.

La Boissière (French pronunciation: [la bwasjɛʁ]; Occitan: La Boissièira) is a commune in the Hérault department in southern France.

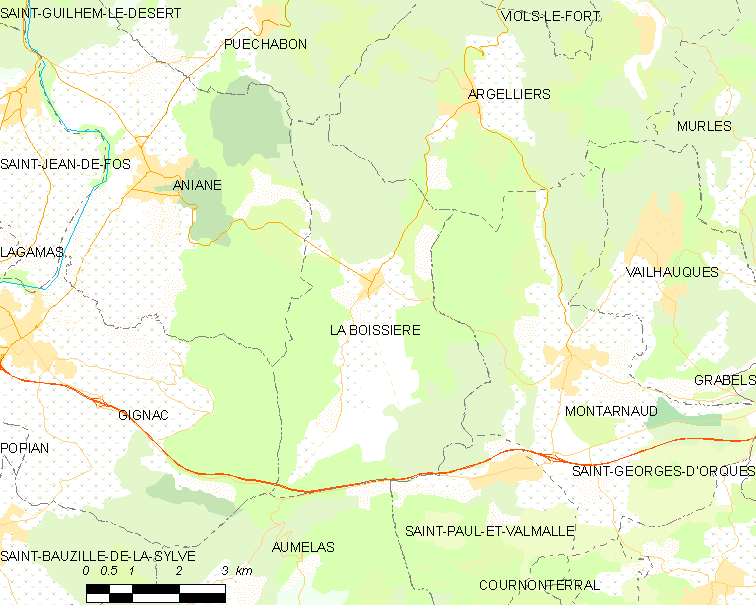
Map

== Population ==
Historical population
Year	Pop.	±% p.a.
1968	221	—
1975	253	+1.95%
1982	404	+6.91%
1990	594	+4.94%
1999	718	+2.13%
2007	864	+2.34%
2012	948	+1.87%
2017	1,021	+1.49%
2023	1,072	+0.82%
Source: INSEE

== See also ==
- Communes of the Hérault department
