= Saint-Paul-et-Valmalle =

- Commune
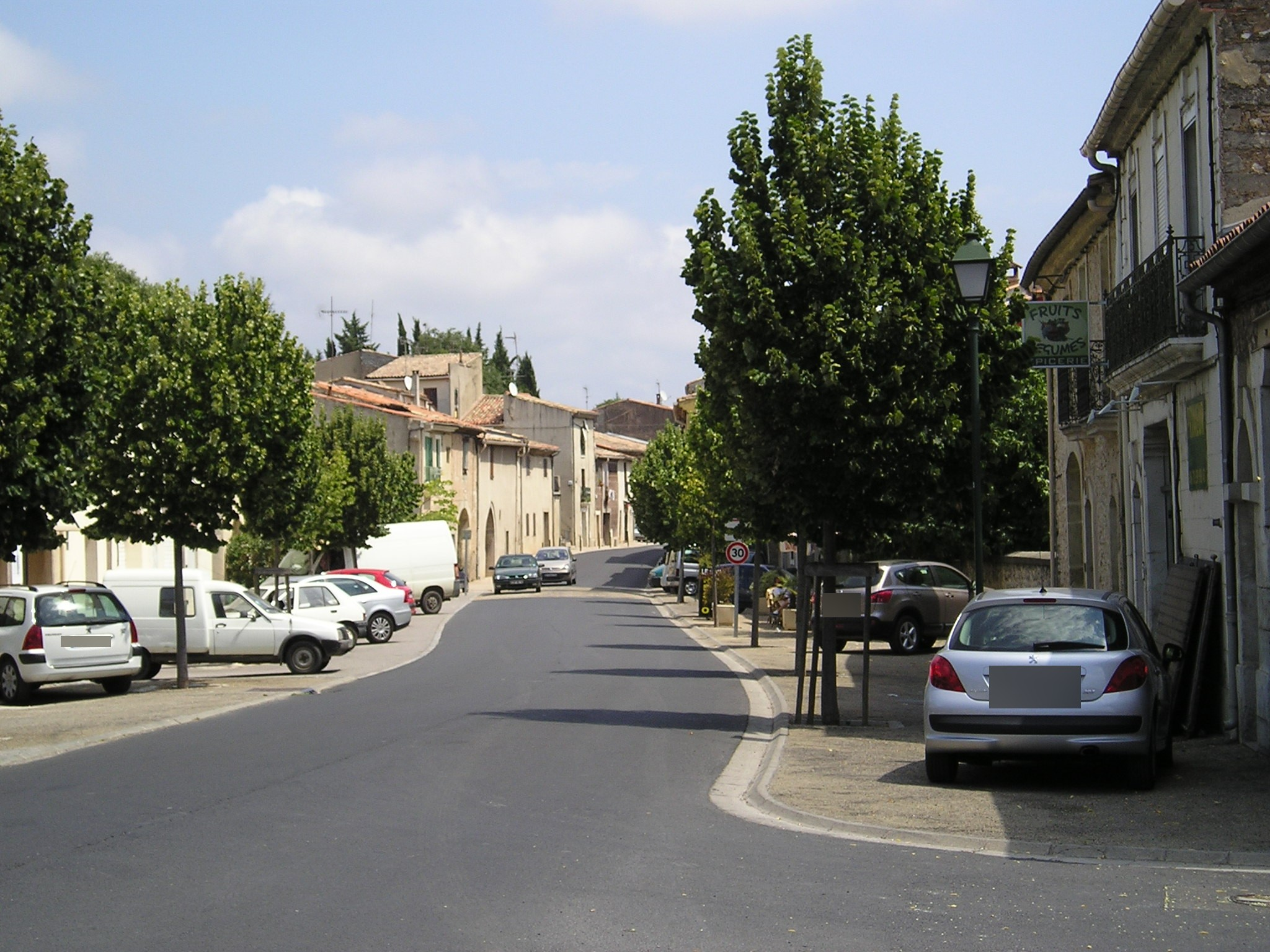
- The main road in Saint-Paul-et-Valmalle

- Coat of arms
- Location of Saint-Paul-et-Valmalle
- Location within France Location within Occitanie
- Coordinates: 43°37′38″N 3°40′32″E
- Country: France
- Region: Occitania
- Department: Hérault
- Arrondissement: Lodève
- Canton: Gignac
- Intercommunality: Vallée de l'Hérault

Government
  - Mayor (2020–2026): Jean-Pierre Bertolini
- Area^{1}: 12.72 km^{2} (4.91 sq mi)
- Elevation: 140 m (460 ft)
- Highest elevation: 341 m (1,119 ft)
- Lowest elevation: 110 m (360 ft)
- Population (2023): 1,394
  - Density: 109.6/km^{2} (283.8/sq mi)
- Time zone: UTC+01:00 (CET)
  - Summer (DST): UTC+02:00 (CEST)
- INSEE/Postal code: 34282 /34570
- ^{1} French Land Register data, which excludes lakes, ponds, glaciers > 1 km^{2} (0.386 sq mi or 247 acres) and river estuaries.

Saint-Paul-et-Valmalle (French pronunciation: [sɛ̃ pɔl e valmal]; Languedocien: Sant Pau e Valmala) is a commune in the Hérault department in the Occitanie region in southern France.

== Population ==
Historical population
Year	Pop.	±% p.a.
1968	272	—
1975	315	+2.12%
1982	385	+2.91%
1990	593	+5.55%
1999	754	+2.70%
2007	846	+1.45%
2012	1,040	+4.22%
2017	1,124	+1.57%
2023	1,394	+3.65%
Source: INSEE

== See also ==
- Communes of the Hérault department
