= Plaissan =

- Commune
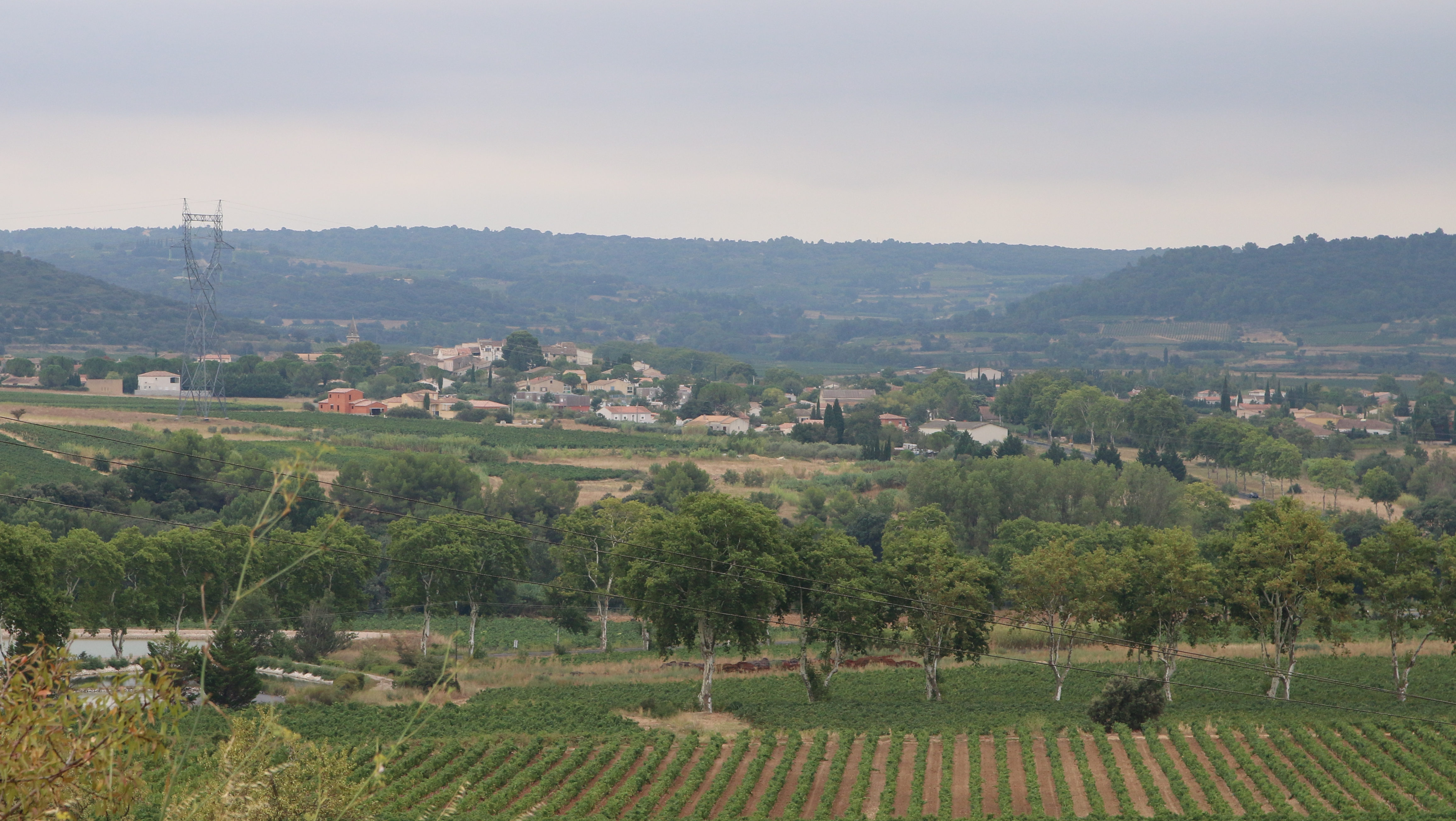

- Coat of arms
- Location of Plaissan
- Location within France Location within Occitanie
- Coordinates: 43°33′32″N 3°31′36″E
- Country: France
- Region: Occitania
- Department: Hérault
- Arrondissement: Lodève
- Canton: Gignac
- Intercommunality: Vallée de l'Hérault

Government
  - Mayor (2020–2026): Béatrice Fernando
- Area^{1}: 5.79 km^{2} (2.24 sq mi)
- Elevation: 65 m (213 ft)
- Highest elevation: 165 m (541 ft)
- Lowest elevation: 35 m (115 ft)
- Population (2023): 1,718
  - Density: 297/km^{2} (768/sq mi)
- Time zone: UTC+01:00 (CET)
  - Summer (DST): UTC+02:00 (CEST)
- INSEE/Postal code: 34204 /34230
- ^{1} French Land Register data, which excludes lakes, ponds, glaciers > 1 km^{2} (0.386 sq mi or 247 acres) and river estuaries.

Plaissan (French pronunciation: [plesɑ̃]) is a commune in the Hérault department in the Occitanie region in southern France.

Exposed to a Mediterranean climate, Plaissan is drained by the Dardaillon, the Rouvièges stream, and two other rivers. The municipality's natural heritage includes an area of ecological, fauna, and floristic interest.

== Geography ==
Between the sea and the Cévennes, the village is surrounded by vineyards and scrubland.

Montpellier is 35 km to the east, while Béziers is 40 km to the west. The sea is 30 km to the south.

=== Climate ===
In 2010, the municipality’s climate was classified as Mediterranean, based on a study using data from 1971 to 2001. According to Météo-France's 2020 climate typology for metropolitan France, the municipality falls within the Provence-Alpes-Côte d'Azur and Languedoc-Roussillon climate region. The region is characterized by low summer rainfall, abundant sunshine (2,600 hours per year), hot summers (average temperature of 21.5 °C), very dry air in summer, dry conditions throughout the year, frequent strong winds (40 to 50% of days with winds > 5 m/s), and little fog.

From 1971 to 2000, the average annual temperature in the municipality was 14.5 °C, with a yearly thermal range of 16.3 °C. Annual precipitation averaged 721 mm, with 6.1 days of rainfall in January and 2.6 days in July. Between 1991 and 2020, the nearest weather station in Saint-André-de-Sangonis recorded an average annual temperature of 15.5 °C and an average annual precipitation of 652.4 mm. Climate projections for 2050, based on various greenhouse gas emission scenarios, are available on a dedicated website published by Météo-France in November 2022.

=== Natural environments and biodiversity ===
The Inventory of Natural Areas of Ecological, Fauna, and Floristic Interest (ZNIEFF) aims to encompass the most ecologically significant areas, primarily to enhance understanding of the national natural heritage and to provide regional planners with a tool to integrate environmental considerations into their decision-making processes.

In the municipality, a ZNIEFF type 2, noted as "Causse of Aumelas and Moure Mountain" (16,237 ha), is designated, spanning across 16 municipalities within the department.

== Population ==
Plaissan is part of the Montpellier attraction area. The inhabitants of Plaissan are called Plaissanais (male) or Plaissanaises (female) in French.

Historical population
Year	Pop.	±% p.a.
1968	641	—
1975	543	−2.34%
1982	597	+1.36%
1990	616	+0.39%
1999	642	+0.46%
2007	883	+4.06%
2012	961	+1.71%
2017	1,196	+4.47%
2023	1,718	+6.22%
Source: INSEE

== See also ==
- Communes of the Hérault department
