= Vendémian =

- Commune
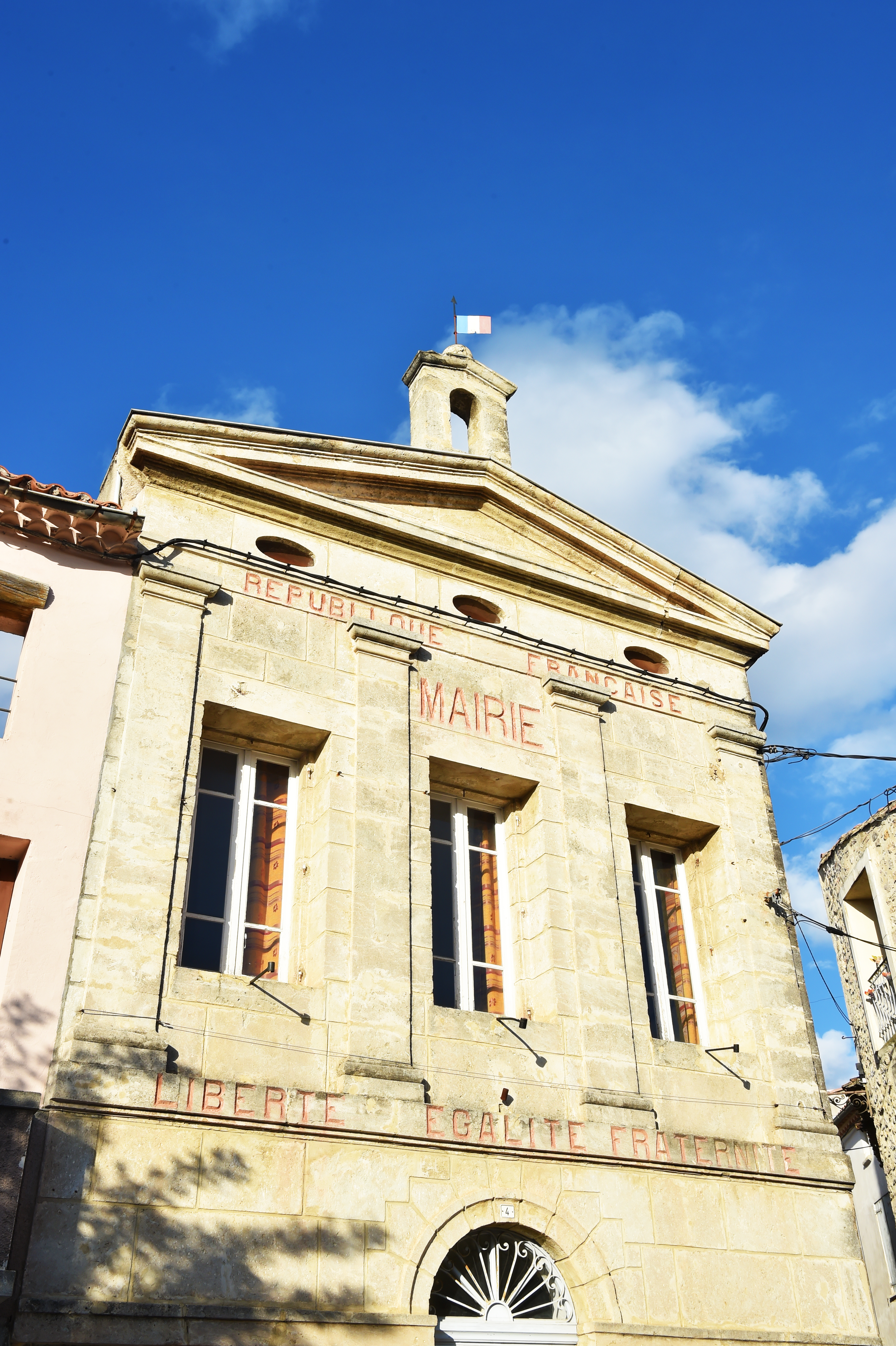
- Town hall

- Coat of arms
- Location of Vendémian
- Location within France Location within Occitanie
- Coordinates: 43°34′57″N 3°33′43″E
- Country: France
- Region: Occitania
- Department: Hérault
- Arrondissement: Lodève
- Canton: Gignac
- Intercommunality: Vallée de l'Hérault

Government
  - Mayor (2020–2026): David Cablat
- Area^{1}: 16.89 km^{2} (6.52 sq mi)
- Elevation: 93 m (305 ft)
- Highest elevation: 282 m (925 ft)
- Lowest elevation: 57 m (187 ft)
- Population (2023): 1,149
  - Density: 68.03/km^{2} (176.2/sq mi)
- Time zone: UTC+01:00 (CET)
  - Summer (DST): UTC+02:00 (CEST)
- INSEE/Postal code: 34328 /34230
- ^{1} French Land Register data, which excludes lakes, ponds, glaciers > 1 km^{2} (0.386 sq mi or 247 acres) and river estuaries.

Vendémian (French pronunciation: [vɑ̃demjɑ̃]; Occitan: Vendemian) is a commune in the Hérault department in the Occitanie region in southern France.

It is located on the D131 route, between Montpellier and Beziers.

== Population ==
Historical population
Year	Pop.	±% p.a.
1968	533	—
1975	528	−0.13%
1982	536	+0.22%
1990	589	+1.19%
1999	792	+3.35%
2007	963	+2.47%
2012	1,076	+2.24%
2017	1,056	−0.37%
2023	1,149	+1.42%
Source: INSEE

== See also ==
- Communes of the Hérault department
