= Saint-Pargoire =

- Commune
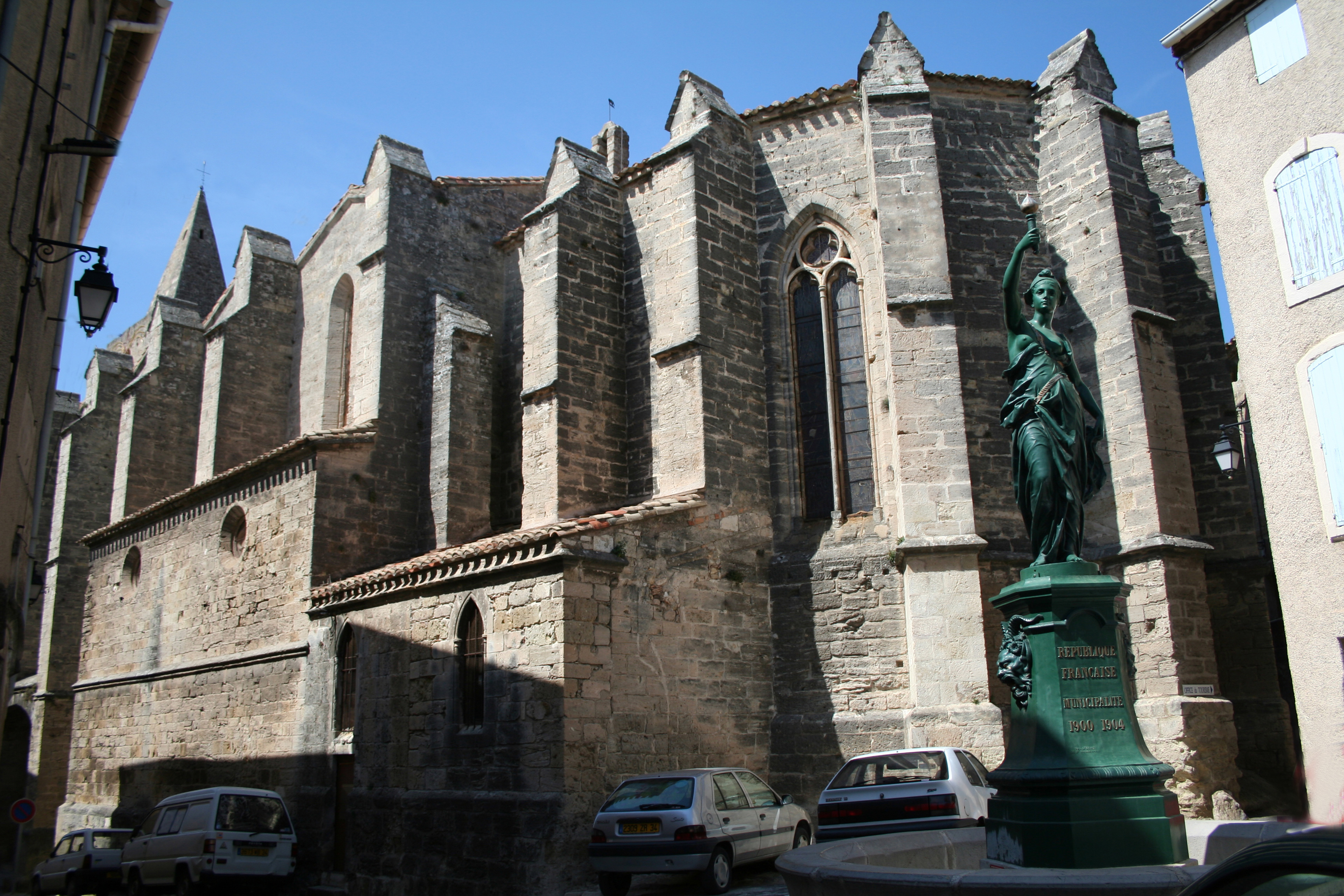
- The church of Saint-Pargoire

- Coat of arms
- Location of Saint-Pargoire
- Location within France Location within Occitanie
- Coordinates: 43°31′43″N 3°31′11″E
- Country: France
- Region: Occitania
- Department: Hérault
- Arrondissement: Lodève
- Canton: Gignac
- Intercommunality: Vallée de l'Hérault

Government
  - Mayor (2020–2026): Jean-Luc Darmanin
- Area^{1}: 23.77 km^{2} (9.18 sq mi)
- Elevation: 74 m (243 ft)
- Highest elevation: 221 m (725 ft)
- Lowest elevation: 18 m (59 ft)
- Population (2023): 2,501
  - Density: 105.2/km^{2} (272.5/sq mi)
- Time zone: UTC+01:00 (CET)
  - Summer (DST): UTC+02:00 (CEST)
- INSEE/Postal code: 34281 /34230
- ^{1} French Land Register data, which excludes lakes, ponds, glaciers > 1 km^{2} (0.386 sq mi or 247 acres) and river estuaries.

Saint-Pargoire (French pronunciation: [sɛ̃ paʁɡwaʁ]; Occitan: Sant Pargòri) is a commune in the Hérault department in the Occitanie region in southern France.

== Population ==
Historical population

Year	Pop.	±% p.a.
1793	1,181	—
1800	1,197	+0.19%
1806	1,391	+2.54%
1821	1,452	+0.29%
1831	1,496	+0.30%
1836	1,768	+3.40%
1841	1,806	+0.43%
1846	1,631	−2.02%
1851	1,686	+0.67%
1856	1,751	+0.76%
1861	1,776	+0.28%
1866	1,986	+2.26%
1872	2,004	+0.15%
1876	1,910	−1.19%
1881	1,498	−4.74%
1886	1,514	+0.21%
1891	1,557	+0.56%
1896	1,524	−0.43%
1901	1,640	+1.48%

Year	Pop.	±% p.a.
1906	1,638	−0.02%
1911	1,696	+0.70%
1921	1,775	+0.46%
1926	1,750	−0.28%
1931	1,740	−0.11%
1936	1,706	−0.39%
1946	1,417	−1.84%
1954	1,422	+0.04%
1962	1,437	+0.13%
1968	1,482	+0.52%
1975	1,243	−2.48%
1982	1,209	−0.40%
1990	1,252	+0.44%
1999	1,357	+0.90%
2007	1,793	+3.54%
2012	2,147	+3.67%
2017	2,276	+1.17%
2023	2,501	+1.58%

Source: EHESS and INSEE (1968-2023)

== See also ==
- Communes of the Hérault department
