= Climatological normal =

30-year average of a weather variable for a given time of year

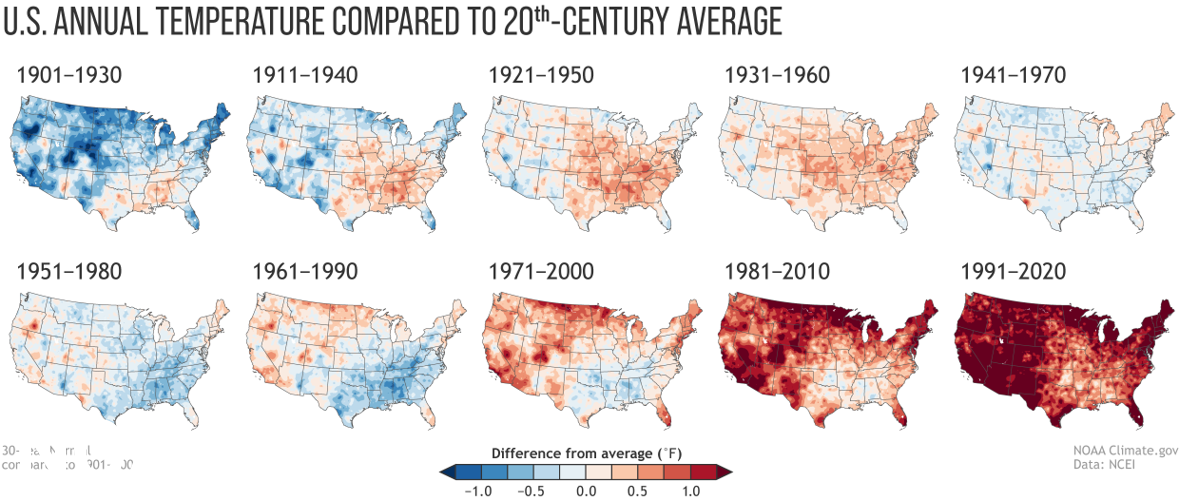
Annual U.S. temperature compared to the 20th-century average for each U.S. Climate Normals period from 1901–1930 to 1991–2020.

Climatological normal or climate normal (CN) is a 30-year average of a weather variable for a given time of year. Most commonly, a CN refers to a particular month of year, but it may also refer to a broader scale, such as a specific meteorological season. More recently, CN have been reported for narrower scales, such as day of year and even hourly scale.

Climatological normals are used as an average or baseline to evaluate climate events and provide context for year-to-year variability. Normals can be calculated for a variety of weather variables including temperature and precipitation and rely on data from weather stations. Variability from the 30-year averages is typical and climate variability looks at the magnitude of extremes. Climatological standard normals are overlapping periods updated every decade: 1971–2000, 1981–2010, 1991–2020, etc.

The term "normal" first appeared in the literature by Heinrich Wilhelm Dove in 1840 and the concept was formalized by the International Meteorological Committee in 1872. The use of the 30-year period of normals began in 1935 with the 1901-30 period. The continued use of 30 year normals has increasingly been called into question due to substantial evidence that the stationarity of climate statistics can no longer be taken for granted due to climate change. This has led to alternative definitions such as "Optimal Climate Normal" and the "Hinge Fit" approach to supplement the standard 30 year normals which are still commonly used. More recently, modern smoothing techniques such as spline-based methods have also been proposed and used operationally to estimate the expected (mean) state of climate variables for the coming year or years .

== See also ==
- Climate anomaly
- Climatology
- Seasonality
