= Canet, Hérault =

Canet
- Commune
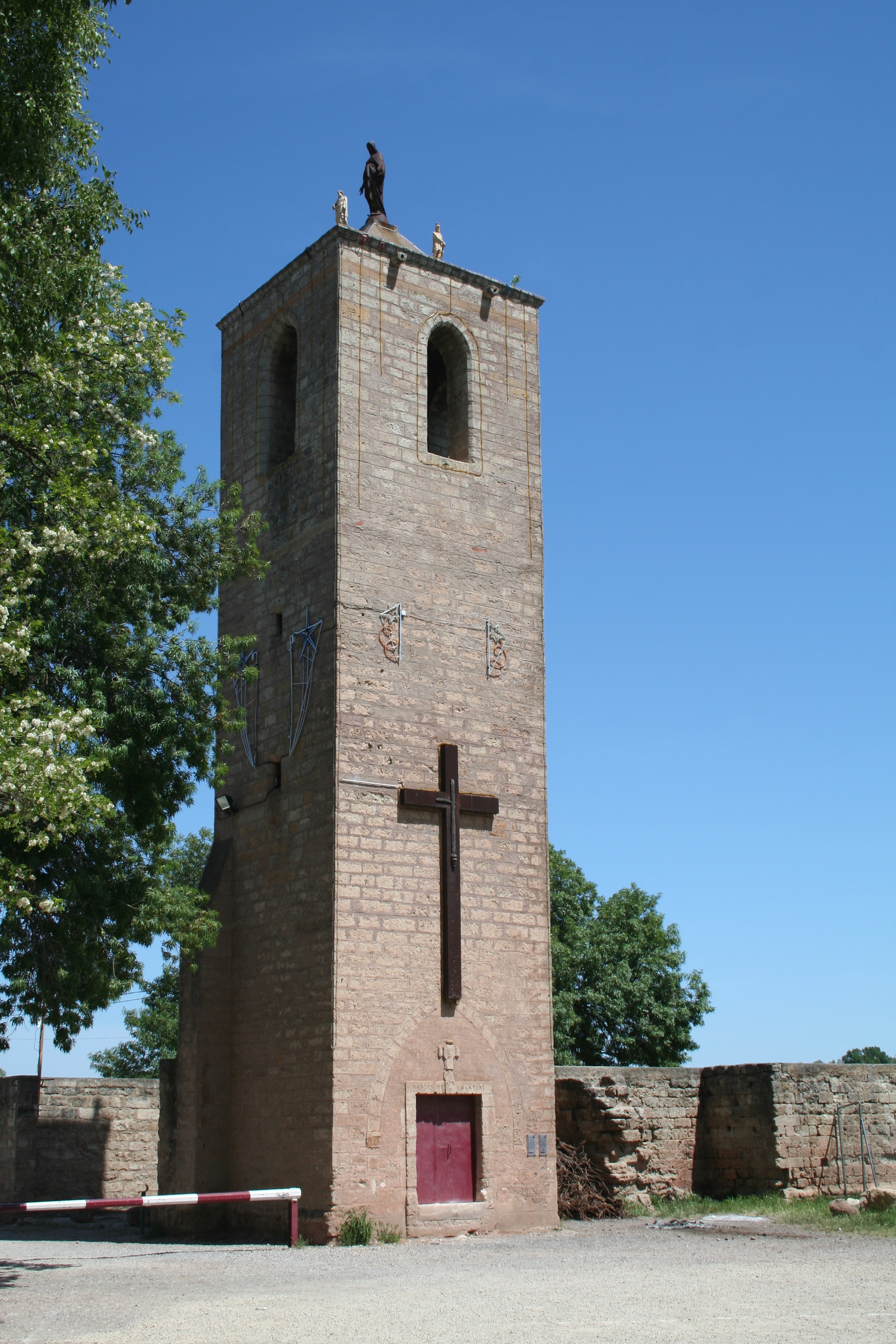
- Church tower of St-Martin

- Coat of arms
- Location of Canet
- Location within France Location within Occitanie
- Coordinates: 43°36′06″N 3°29′26″E
- Country: France
- Region: Occitania
- Department: Hérault
- Arrondissement: Lodève
- Canton: Clermont-l'Hérault
- Intercommunality: Clermontais

Government
  - Mayor (2020–2026): Claude Revel
- Area^{1}: 7.32 km^{2} (2.83 sq mi)
- Elevation: 32 m (105 ft)
- Highest elevation: 57 m (187 ft)
- Lowest elevation: 23 m (75 ft)
- Population (2023): 3,619
  - Density: 494/km^{2} (1,280/sq mi)
- Time zone: UTC+01:00 (CET)
  - Summer (DST): UTC+02:00 (CEST)
- INSEE/Postal code: 34051 /34800
- ^{1} French Land Register data, which excludes lakes, ponds, glaciers > 1 km^{2} (0.386 sq mi or 247 acres) and river estuaries.

Canet (French pronunciation: [kanɛ]) is a commune in the Hérault department in southern France.

== Geography ==
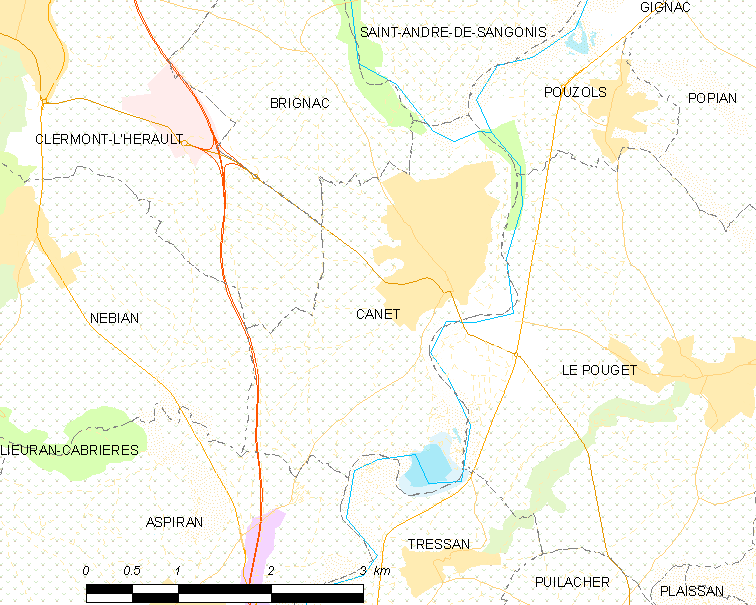
Map

The neighboring communes are Aspiran, Brignac, Clermont-l'Hérault, Nébian, Le Pouget, Pouzols, Saint-André-de-Sangonis, and Tressan.

Situated along the Hérault River, it is located approximately 6 km from Clermont-l'Hérault.

=== Climate ===
In 2010, the climate of the commune is classified as a frank Mediterranean climate, according to a study based on a dataset covering the 1971-2000 period. In 2020, Météo-France published a typology of climates in mainland France in which the commune is exposed to a Mediterranean climate and is part of the Provence, Languedoc-Roussillon climatic region, characterized by low rainfall in summer, very good sunshine (2,600 h/year), a hot summer 21.5 °C (71 °F), very dry air in summer, dry conditions in all seasons, strong winds (with a frequency of 40 to 50% for winds > 5 m/s), and little fog.

For the 1971-2000 period, the average annual temperature was 14.7 °C (58 °F) with an annual atmospheric temperature of 16.4 °C (62 °F). The average annual total rainfall during this period was 679 mm, with 6.1 days of precipitation in January and 2.7 days in July. For the subsequent period of 1991 to 2020, the average annual temperature observed at the nearest weather station, located in the commune of Saint-André-de-Sangonis, 5.44 kilometres (3 mi) away as the crow flies, is 15.5 °C (60 °F), and the average annual total rainfall is 652.4 mm.

For the future, climate parameters for the commune projected for 2050, based on different greenhouse gas emission scenarios, can be consulted on a dedicated website published by Météo-France in November 2022.

== Population ==
Historical population
Year	Pop.	±% p.a.
1968	1,022	—
1975	1,061	+0.54%
1982	1,206	+1.85%
1990	1,402	+1.90%
1999	1,598	+1.46%
2007	3,039	+8.37%
2012	3,413	+2.35%
2017	3,503	+0.52%
2023	3,619	+0.54%
Source: INSEE

== See also ==
- Communes of the Hérault department
