= Pouzols =

- Commune
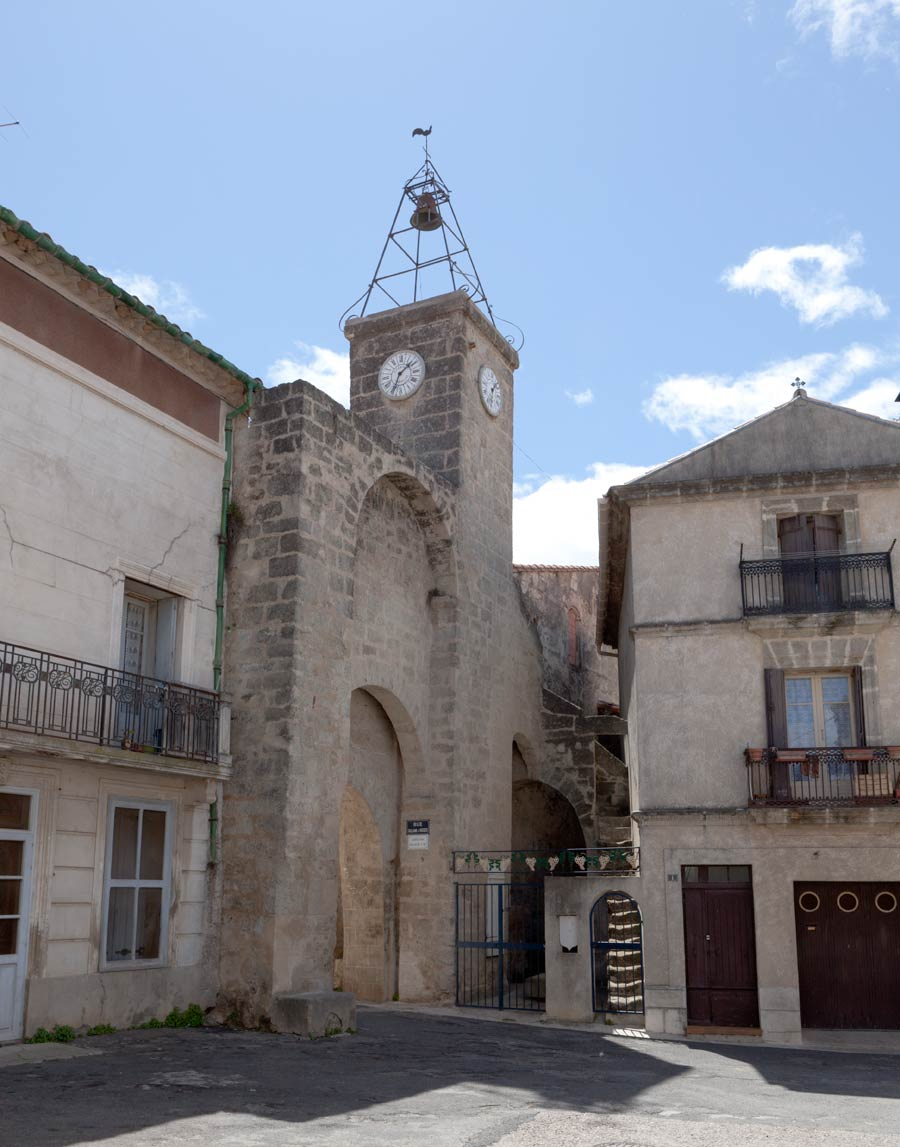
- The bell tower in Pouzols

- Coat of arms
- Location of Pouzols
- Location within France Location within Occitanie
- Coordinates: 43°37′09″N 3°30′48″E
- Country: France
- Region: Occitania
- Department: Hérault
- Arrondissement: Lodève
- Canton: Gignac
- Intercommunality: Vallée de l'Hérault

Government
  - Mayor (2020–2026): Véronique Marié-Neil
- Area^{1}: 2.96 km^{2} (1.14 sq mi)
- Elevation: 48 m (157 ft)
- Highest elevation: 100 m (330 ft)
- Lowest elevation: 27 m (89 ft)
- Population (2023): 953
  - Density: 322/km^{2} (834/sq mi)
- Time zone: UTC+01:00 (CET)
  - Summer (DST): UTC+02:00 (CEST)
- INSEE/Postal code: 34215 /34230
- ^{1} French Land Register data, which excludes lakes, ponds, glaciers > 1 km^{2} (0.386 sq mi or 247 acres) and river estuaries.

Pouzols (French pronunciation: [puzɔl]; Occitan: Posòls) is a commune in the Hérault department in the Occitanie region in southern France.

== Geography ==
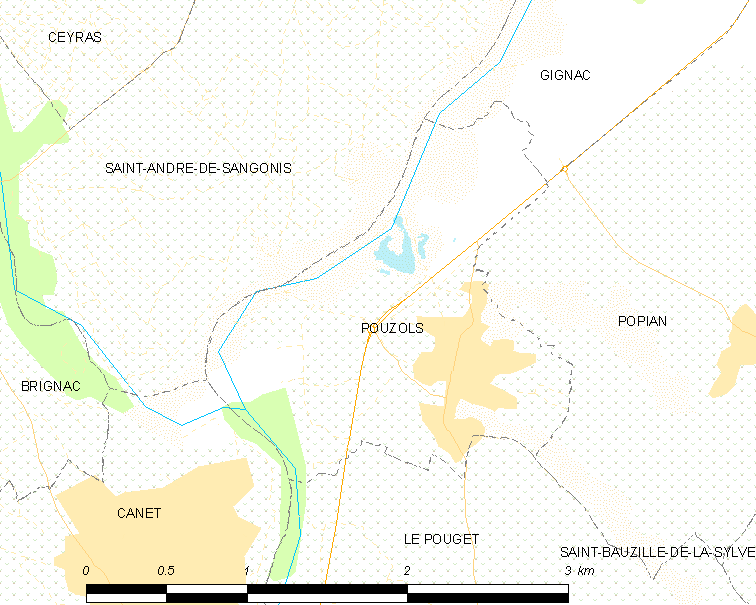
Map

The neighboring communes are Canet, Gignac, Popian, Le Pouget and Saint-André-de-Sangonis.

=== Climate ===
In 2010, the climate of the commune is classified as a frank Mediterranean climate, according to a study based on a dataset covering the 1971-2000 period. In 2020, Météo-France published a typology of climates in mainland France in which the commune is exposed to a Mediterranean climate and is part of the Provence, Languedoc-Roussillon climatic region, characterized by low rainfall in summer, very good sunshine (2,600 h/year), a hot summer 21.5 °C (71 °F), very dry air in summer, dry conditions in all seasons, strong winds (with a frequency of 40 to 50% for winds > 5 m/s), and little fog.

For the 1971-2000 period, the average annual temperature was 14.4 °C (58 °F) with an annual atmospheric temperature of 16.3 °C (61 °F). The average annual total rainfall during this period was 732 mm, with 6.5 days of precipitation in January and 2.8 days in July. For the subsequent period of 1991 to 2020, the average annual temperature observed at the nearest weather station, located in the commune of Saint-André-de-Sangonis, 4 kilometres (2 mi) away as the crow flies, is 15.5 °C (60 °F), and the average annual total rainfall is 652.4 mm.

For the future, climate parameters for the commune projected for 2050, based on different greenhouse gas emission scenarios, can be consulted on a dedicated website published by Météo-France in November 2022.

== Population ==
Historical population

Year	Pop.	±% p.a.
1793	269	—
1800	272	+0.16%
1806	302	+1.76%
1821	262	−0.94%
1831	340	+2.64%
1836	338	−0.12%
1841	319	−1.15%
1846	324	+0.31%
1851	346	+1.32%
1856	359	+0.74%
1861	352	−0.39%
1866	373	+1.17%
1872	361	−0.54%
1876	407	+3.04%
1881	324	−4.46%
1886	332	+0.49%
1891	424	+5.01%
1896	420	−0.19%
1901	458	+1.75%

Year	Pop.	±% p.a.
1906	465	+0.30%
1911	471	+0.26%
1921	512	+0.84%
1926	539	+1.03%
1931	569	+1.09%
1936	475	−3.55%
1946	511	+0.73%
1954	428	−2.19%
1962	441	+0.37%
1968	413	−1.09%
1975	335	−2.95%
1982	368	+1.35%
1990	436	+2.14%
1999	629	+4.16%
2007	812	+3.24%
2012	867	+1.32%
2017	967	+2.21%
2023	953	−0.24%

Source: Ldh/EHESS/Cassini until 1999, and INSEE since 2007.

== See also ==
- Communes of the Hérault department
