= Courties =

- Commune
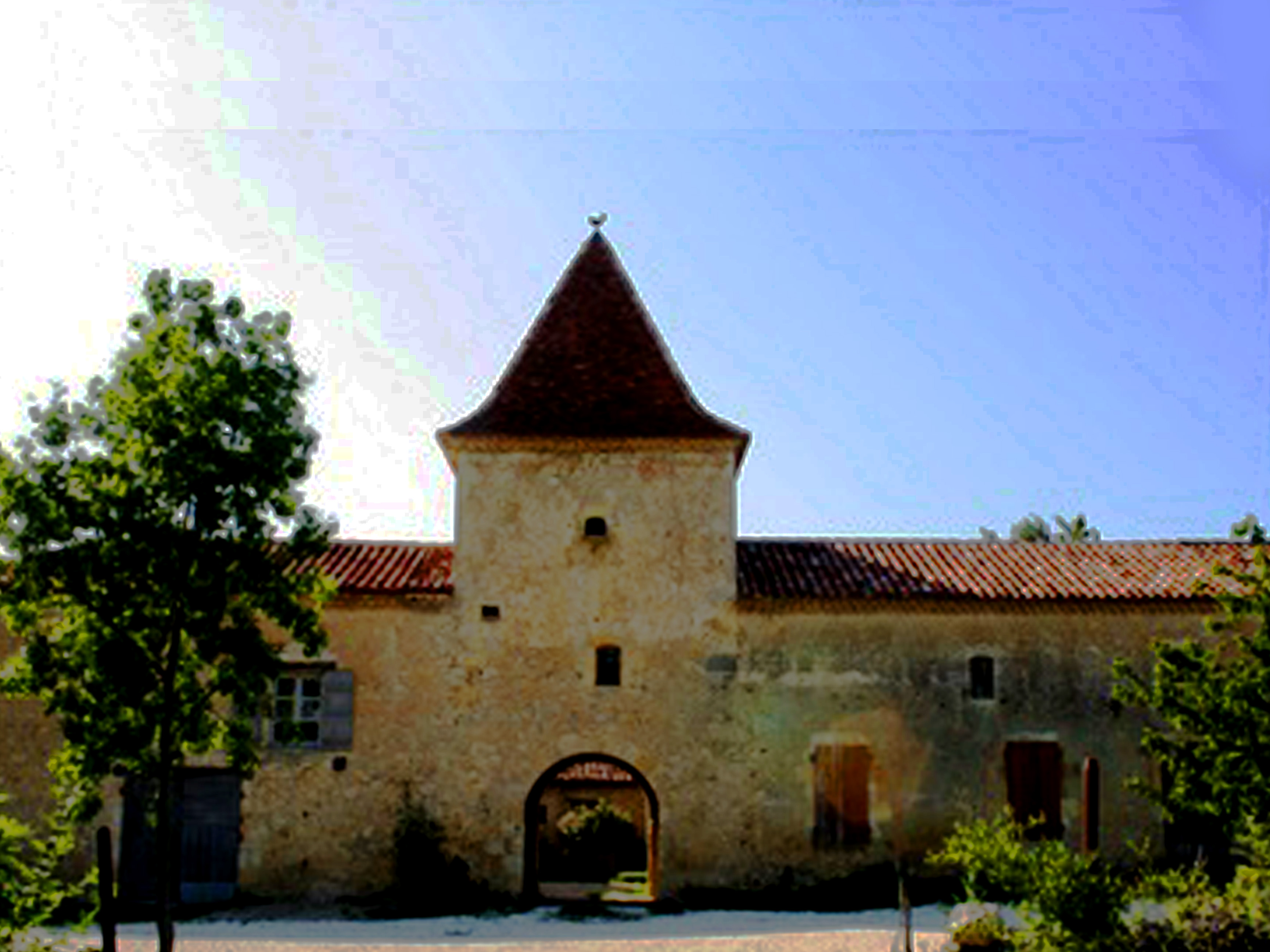
- The fortified gateway in Courties
- Location of Courties
- Location within France Location within Occitanie
- Coordinates: 43°34′33″N 0°09′27″E
- Country: France
- Region: Occitania
- Department: Gers
- Arrondissement: Mirande
- Canton: Pardiac-Rivière-Bass

Government
  - Mayor (2020–2026): Olivier Bonnafont
- Area^{1}: 6.02 km^{2} (2.32 sq mi)
- Elevation: 260 m (850 ft)
- Highest elevation: 260 m (850 ft)
- Lowest elevation: 145 m (476 ft)
- Population (2023): 46
  - Density: 7.6/km^{2} (20/sq mi)
- Time zone: UTC+01:00 (CET)
  - Summer (DST): UTC+02:00 (CEST)
- INSEE/Postal code: 32111 /32230
- ^{1} French Land Register data, which excludes lakes, ponds, glaciers > 1 km^{2} (0.386 sq mi or 247 acres) and river estuaries.

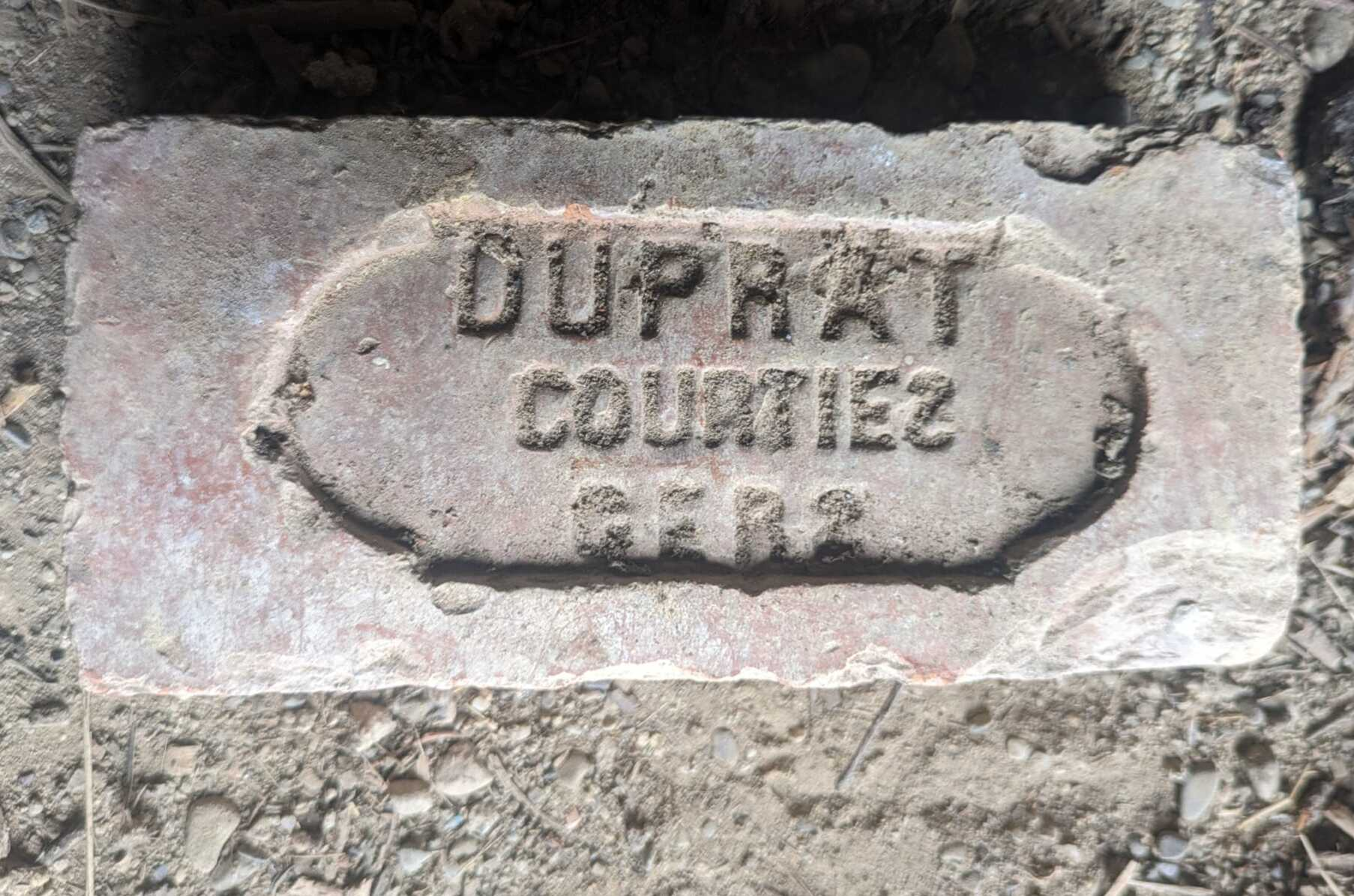
Brick from the Courties Brickwork

Courties (French pronunciation: [kuʁti]; Occitan: Cortias) is a commune in the Gers department in southwestern France. Historically and culturally, the commune is in the Pays d'Astarac, a very hilly territory in the south of Gers, with clay soil, which runs along the Lannemezan plateau.Exposed to an altered oceanic climate, it is drained by the Lys and various other small streams. Courties is a rural commune with 46 inhabitants in 2023, after experiencing a peak in population of 296 inhabitants in 1846. Its inhabitants are called Courtiers or Courtisanes.

== Geography ==
Localization:

Commune of Gascony located about ten kilometres north of Marciac.

Neighbouring municipalities:

The neighbouring communes are Armous-et-Cau, Beaumarchés, Louslitges and Tourdun.

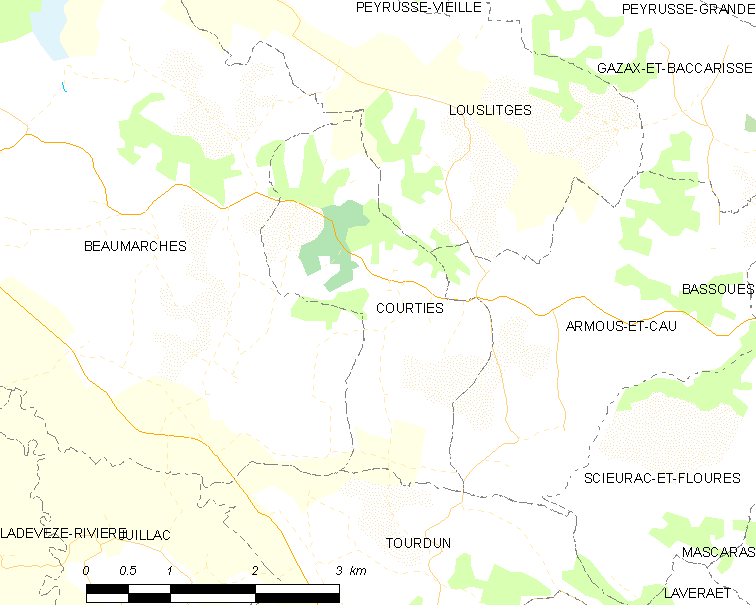
Courties and its surrounding communes

=== Geology and landforms ===
Courties is located in seismicity zone 2 (low seismicity)

=== Hydrography ===
The commune is located in the Adour Bassin, within the Adour-Garonne river basin. It is drained by the Lys and the Mauran stream and by two small rivers, which form a hydrographic network of 3 km in total length.

=== Climate ===
In 2010, the climate of the commune was of the altered oceanic climate, according to a study based on a series of data covering the period 1971-2000. In 2020, Météo-France publishes a typology of climates of metropolitan France in which the commune is still exposed to an altered oceanic climate and is in the climatic region Aquitaine, Gascony, characterized by abundant rainfall in spring, moderate in autumn, low sunshine in spring, hot summer (19,.5 °C), light winds, frequent fog in fall and winter, and frequent thunderstorms in summer (15 to 20 days).

For the period 1971-2000, the average annual temperature is 13.2 °C, with an annual temperature range of 14.4 °C. The average annual precipitation is 927 mm, with 11.2 days of precipitation in January and 7.1 days in July.5 For the period 1991-2020 the average annual temperature observed at the nearest weather station, located on the commune of Peyrusse-Grande, 8 km as the crow flies, is 13.7 °C and the average annual precipitation is 835.1 mm. For the future, the climate parameters of the municipality estimated for 2050 according to different greenhouse gas emission scenarios can be consulted on a dedicated site published by Météo-France in November 2022.

=== Natural environments and biodiversity ===
No natural area of heritage interest is listed in the commune in the national inventory of natural heritage.

== Town planning ==
=== Typology ===
Courties is a rural municipality, as it is one of the municipalities with low or very low density, according to the INSEE municipal density grid. The municipality is also out of the city's attractions.

=== Land use ===
The land cover of the municipality, as it emerges from the European database of biophysical land cover Corine Land Cover (CLC), is marked by the importance of agricultural land (79.2% in 2018), a proportion identical to that of 1990 (79.3%). The detailed breakdown in 2018 is as follows: grassland (50%), forest (20.7%), heterogeneous agricultural areas (18.1%), arable land (11.1%). The evolution of the land use of the municipality and its infrastructures can be observed on the various cartographic representations of the territory: Cassini's map (eighteenth century), the staff map (1820-1866) and the IGN's maps or aerial photos for the current period (1950 to today).

=== Major risks ===
The territory of the municipality of Courties is vulnerable to various natural hazards: meteorological (storms, thunderstorms, snow, extreme cold, heat waves or drought) and earthquakes (low seismicity). A website published by BRGM makes it possible to quickly and easily assess the risks of a property located either by its address or by the number of its plot.

Map of shrinkage-swelling hazard zones of clay soils in Courties.

The shrinkage and swelling of clay soils is likely to lead to Significant damage to buildings in the event of alternating periods of drought and rain. The entire municipality is at medium or high risk (94.5% at the departmental level and 48.5% at the national level). Of the 38 buildings counted in the commune in 2019, 38 are at medium or high risk, i.e. 100%, compared to 93% at the departmental level and 54% at the national level. A map of the exposure of the national territory to the shrinkage and swelling of clay soils is available on the website of BRGM,.

In addition, in order to better understand the risk of land subsidence, the national inventory of underground cavities makes it possible to locate those located in the municipality.

The municipality has been declared a state of natural disaster due to the damage caused by the floods and mudslides that occurred in 1999 and 2009. With regard to land movements, the municipality has been recognized as being in a state of natural disaster for damage caused by landslides in 1999.

== Population ==
Historical population
Year	Pop.	±% p.a.
1968	80	—
1975	57	−4.73%
1982	49	−2.14%
1990	61	+2.78%
1999	49	−2.40%
2007	42	−1.91%
2012	47	+2.28%
2017	56	+3.57%
2023	46	−3.23%
Source: INSEE

== Economy ==
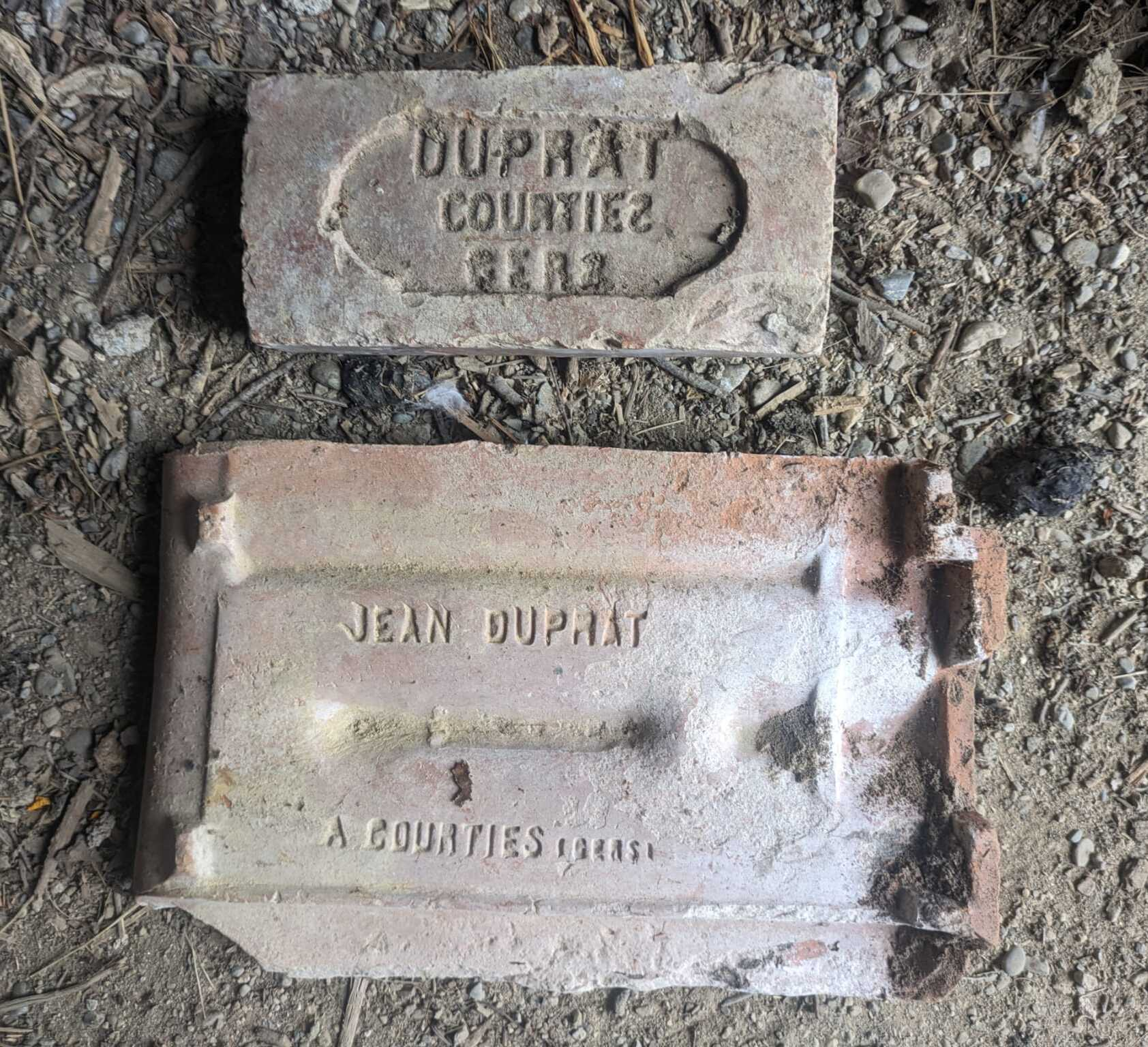
Photo of Brick and Tile from the Courties Brickwork

=== Brickwork ===
Due to bricks and tiles with writing indicating a Courties Brickwork found in a barn in Courties, it is believed that there was once a Brickwork in Courties; there is no source link for this because the person who typed this paragraph knows the people who found the bricks and tiles.

=== Employment ===
In 2018, the population aged 15 to 64 was numbered at 32, of which 86.7% were economically active (60% employed and 26.7% unemployed) and 13.3% were inactive. In 2018, the communal unemployment rate (as defined by the census) of 15-64 year olds is higher than that of the department and France, whereas in 2008 the situation was reversed.

The commune is out of attraction of the towns. It had 9 jobs in 2018, compared to 7 in 2013 and 9 in 2008. The number of economically employed persons resident in the municipality is 19, i.e. an employment concentration indicator of 44% and an activity rate among those aged 15 or over of 61.9%.

Of these 19 employed people aged 15 or over, 8 work in the municipality, i.e. 39% of the population. To get to work, 77.8% of the inhabitants use a four-wheeled personal or company vehicle, 5.6% use public transport and 16.7% do not need transport (work from home).

=== Non-agricultural activities ===
8 establishments are located in Courties as of 31 December 2019. The manufacturing, mining and other industries sector is predominant in the commune since it represents 37.5% of the total number of establishments in the commune (3 out of the 8 companies located in Courties), compared to 12.3% at the departmental level.

=== Agriculture ===
The commune is in the Rivière Basse, a small agricultural region occupying a western part of the Gers department. In 2020, the technical and economic orientation of agriculture in the commune is mixed farming and/or mixed livestock. In the 2020 agricultural census, there were five farms based in the municipality (12 in 1988). The utilised agricultural area is 457 ha.

== Local Culture & Heritage ==
=== Places & Monuments ===
Church of Saint-Pierre-aux-Liens in Courties. Half-timbered house.

== See also ==
- Communes of the Gers department
