= Popian =

- Commune
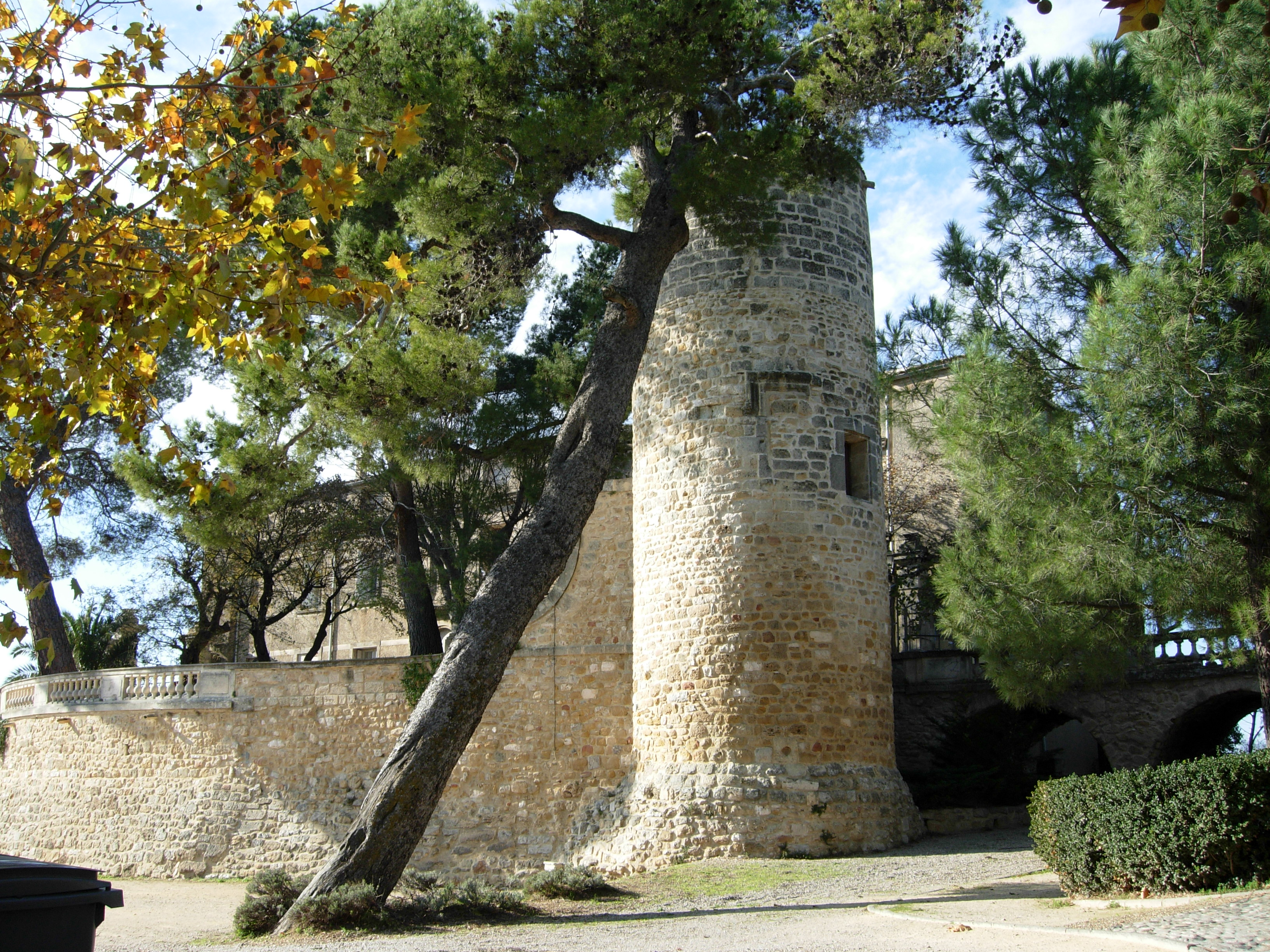
- Town hall in the chateau

- Coat of arms
- Location of Popian
- Location within France Location within Occitanie
- Coordinates: 43°37′15″N 3°32′09″E
- Country: France
- Region: Occitania
- Department: Hérault
- Arrondissement: Lodève
- Canton: Gignac
- Intercommunality: Vallée de l'Hérault

Government
  - Mayor (2020–2026): Marie-Agnès Sibertin-Blanc
- Area^{1}: 5.86 km^{2} (2.26 sq mi)
- Elevation: 50 m (160 ft)
- Highest elevation: 130 m (430 ft)
- Lowest elevation: 47 m (154 ft)
- Population (2023): 380
  - Density: 65/km^{2} (170/sq mi)
- Time zone: UTC+01:00 (CET)
  - Summer (DST): UTC+02:00 (CEST)
- INSEE/Postal code: 34208 /34230
- ^{1} French Land Register data, which excludes lakes, ponds, glaciers > 1 km^{2} (0.386 sq mi or 247 acres) and river estuaries.

Popian (French pronunciation: [pɔpjɑ̃]) is a commune in the Hérault department in the Occitanie region in southern France.

== Geography ==
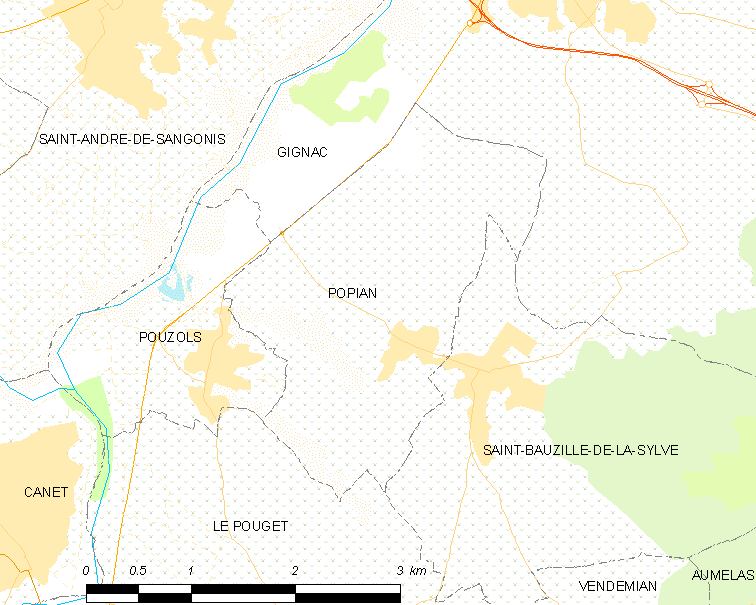
Map

The neighboring communes are Gignac, Saint-Bauzille-de-la-Sylve, Le Pouget and Pouzols.

=== Climate ===
In 2010, the climate of the commune is classified as a frank Mediterranean climate, according to a study based on a dataset covering the 1971-2000 period. In 2020, Météo-France published a typology of climates in mainland France in which the commune is exposed to a Mediterranean climate and is part of the Provence, Languedoc-Roussillon climatic region, characterized by low rainfall in summer, very good sunshine (2,600 h/year), a hot summer 21.5 °C (71 °F), very dry air in summer, dry conditions in all seasons, strong winds (with a frequency of 40 to 50% for winds > 5 m/s), and little fog.

For the 1971-2000 period, the average annual temperature was 14.4 °C (58 °F) with an annual atmospheric temperature of 16.5 °C (62 °F). The average annual total rainfall during this period was 774 mm, with 6.4 days of precipitation in January and 2.7 days in July. For the subsequent period of 1991 to 2020, the average annual temperature observed at the nearest weather station, located in the commune of Saint-André-de-Sangonis, 4 kilometres (2 mi) away as the crow flies, is 15.5 °C (60 °F), and the average annual total rainfall is 652.4 mm.

For the future, climate parameters for the commune projected for 2050, based on different greenhouse gas emission scenarios, can be consulted on a dedicated website published by Météo-France in November 2022.

== Population ==
Historical population

Year	Pop.	±% p.a.
1793	183	—
1800	153	−2.53%
1806	198	+4.39%
1821	199	+0.03%
1831	174	−1.33%
1836	180	+0.68%
1841	168	−1.37%
1846	154	−1.73%
1851	170	+2.00%
1856	153	−2.09%
1861	128	−3.51%
1866	149	+3.08%
1872	159	+1.09%
1876	157	−0.32%
1881	123	−4.76%
1886	118	−0.83%
1891	141	+3.63%
1896	140	−0.14%
1901	171	+4.08%

Year	Pop.	±% p.a.
1906	182	+1.25%
1911	156	−3.04%
1921	187	+1.83%
1926	225	+3.77%
1931	251	+2.21%
1936	239	−0.98%
1946	169	−3.41%
1954	217	+3.17%
1962	233	+0.89%
1968	214	−1.41%
1975	198	−1.10%
1982	168	−2.32%
1990	195	+1.88%
1999	248	+2.71%
2007	332	+3.71%
2012	351	+1.12%
2017	350	−0.06%
2023	380	+1.38%

Source: Ldh/EHESS/Cassini until 1999, and INSEE since 2007.

== See also ==
- Communes of the Hérault department
