= 1708 =

1708 in various calendars
- Gregorian calendar: 1708; MDCCVIII
- Ab urbe condita: 2461
- Armenian calendar: 1157; ԹՎ ՌՃԾԷ
- Assyrian calendar: 6458
- Balinese saka calendar: 1629–1630
- Bengali calendar: 1114–1115
- Berber calendar: 2658
- British Regnal year: 6 Ann. 1 – 7 Ann. 1
- Buddhist calendar: 2252
- Burmese calendar: 1070
- Byzantine calendar: 7216–7217
- Chinese calendar: 丁亥年 (Fire Pig); 4405 or 4198 — to — 戊子年 (Earth Rat); 4406 or 4199
- Coptic calendar: 1424–1425
- Discordian calendar: 2874
- Ethiopian calendar: 1700–1701
- Hebrew calendar: 5468–5469
- Hindu calendars
- Vikram Samvat: 1764–1765
- Shaka Samvat: 1629–1630
- Kali Yuga: 4808–4809
- Holocene calendar: 11708
- Igbo calendar: 708–709
- Iranian calendar: 1086–1087
- Islamic calendar: 1119–1120
- Japanese calendar: Hōei 5 (宝永５年)
- Javanese calendar: 1631–1632
- Julian calendar: Gregorian minus 11 days
- Korean calendar: 4041
- Minguo calendar: 204 before ROC 民前204年
- Nanakshahi calendar: 240
- Thai solar calendar: 2250–2251
- Tibetan calendar: མེ་མོ་ཕག་ལོ་ (female Fire-Boar); 1834 or 1453 or 681 — to — ས་ཕོ་བྱི་བ་ལོ་ (male Earth-Rat); 1835 or 1454 or 682

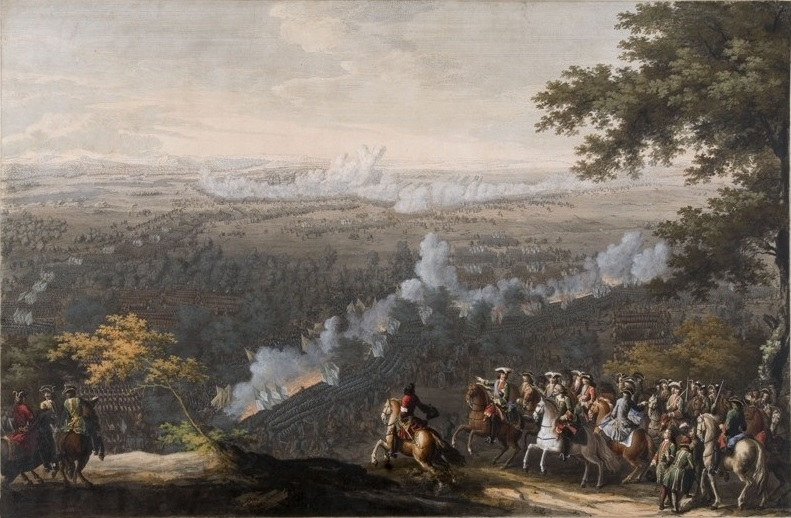
September 28: Peter the Great leads Russia to victory over Sweden in Battle of Lesnaya.

1708 (MDCCVIII) was a leap year starting on Sunday of the Gregorian calendar and a leap year starting on Thursday of the Julian calendar, the 1708th year of the Common Era (CE) and Anno Domini (AD) designations, the 708th year of the 2nd millennium, the 8th year of the 18th century, and the 9th year of the 1700s decade. As of the start of 1708, the Gregorian calendar was 11 days ahead of the Julian calendar, which remained in localized use until 1923.

In the Swedish calendar it was a leap year starting on Wednesday, one day ahead of the Julian and ten days behind the Gregorian calendar.

== Events ==
=== January–June ===
- January 1 – Charles XII of Sweden invades Russia, by crossing the frozen Vistula River with 40,000 men.
- January 7 – Bashkir rebels besiege Yelabuga.
- January 12 – Shahu I becomes the fifth Chhatrapati of the Maratha Empire in the Indian subcontinent.
- February 26 – HMS Falmouth, a 50-gun fourth-rate ship of the line built at Woolwich Dockyard for the British Royal Navy, is launched.
- March 11 – Anne, Queen of Great Britain, withholds Royal Assent from the Scottish Militia Bill, the last time a British monarch vetoes legislation.
- March 23 – James Francis Edward Stuart, Jacobite pretender to the throne of Great Britain, unsuccessfully tries to land from a French fleet in the Firth of Forth in Scotland.
- April 8 – Easter Sunday: The first performance of George Frideric Handel's oratorio La resurrezione takes place in Rome.
- April 9 – Ottoman princess Emine Sultan, daughter of Sultan Mustafa II, marries Grand Vizier Çorlulu Ali Pasha.
- April 28 – The Great Hoei fire breaks out in Kyoto, Japan, destroying the Imperial Palace and a large portion of the old capital.
- June 8 – War of the Spanish Succession: Wager's Action, a naval confrontation, takes place between a British squadron under Charles Wager and the Spanish treasure fleet off Cartagena in the Caribbean Sea. Spanish galleon San José explodes and sinks with the loss of almost all her 600 crew and an estimated 8.8 million ounces troy weight in gold; her wreck is located in 2015.

=== July–December ===
- July 1 – Tewoflos becomes Emperor of Ethiopia.
- July 11 – War of the Spanish Succession: Battle of Oudenarde – Allied forces under the command of John Churchill, 1st Duke of Marlborough, defeat the French in the Spanish Netherlands.
- August – The future Charles VI, Holy Roman Emperor weds Elisabeth Christine of Brunswick-Wolfenbüttel.
- August 3 – In the Battle of Trenčín, 8,000 soldiers of the Imperial Army of the Habsburgs are victorious over the 15,000 Hungarian Kuruc forces of Francis II Rákóczi.
- August 18 – War of the Spanish Succession: Menorca is captured by British forces.
- August 23 – Meidingu Pamheiba is crowned King of Manipur.
- August 29 – A French-Native American attack in Haverhill, Massachusetts kills 16 settlers.
- September 28 (O.S.); September 29 (Swedish calendar); October 9 (N.S.) – Great Northern War: Battle of Lesnaya – Peter the Great of Russia defeats the forces of the Swedish Empire.
- October 12 – War of the Spanish Succession: Dutch, British and Austrian forces capture Lille after a two-month siege, although the citadel continues to hold out for another six weeks.
- October 26 – Topping out of new St Paul's Cathedral in London.
- December 14 – The première of Electre by Prosper Jolyot de Crébillon takes place in Paris.
- December 17 – Deborah Churchill, British pickpocket and prostitute, is executed before a large crowd for being an accomplice to murder.

=== Date unknown ===
- Fearful of a Swedish attack, the Russians blow up the city of Tartu, Estonia.
- The Russians burn the city of Porvoo, Finland (at the time part of Sweden).
- One third of the population of Masuria dies of the plague.
- Johann Sebastian Bach is appointed as chamber musician and organist, at the court in Weimar.
- Italian philosopher Giambattista Vico delivers his inaugural lecture to the University of Naples, which will be published in 1709 as his first book, De Nostri Temporis Studiorum Ratione (On the Order of the Scholarly Disciplines of Our Times).
- Calcareous hard-paste porcelain is produced for the first time in Europe, at Dresden, Saxony, by Ehrenfried Walther von Tschirnhaus, and developed after his death (October) by Johann Friedrich Böttger.
- The Company of Merchants of London Trading (with consent of the Parliament of Great Britain) merges with the East Indies, and the more recently established English Company Trading to the East Indies, to form the United Company of Merchants of England Trading to the East Indies, known as the Honourable East India Company.

== Births ==
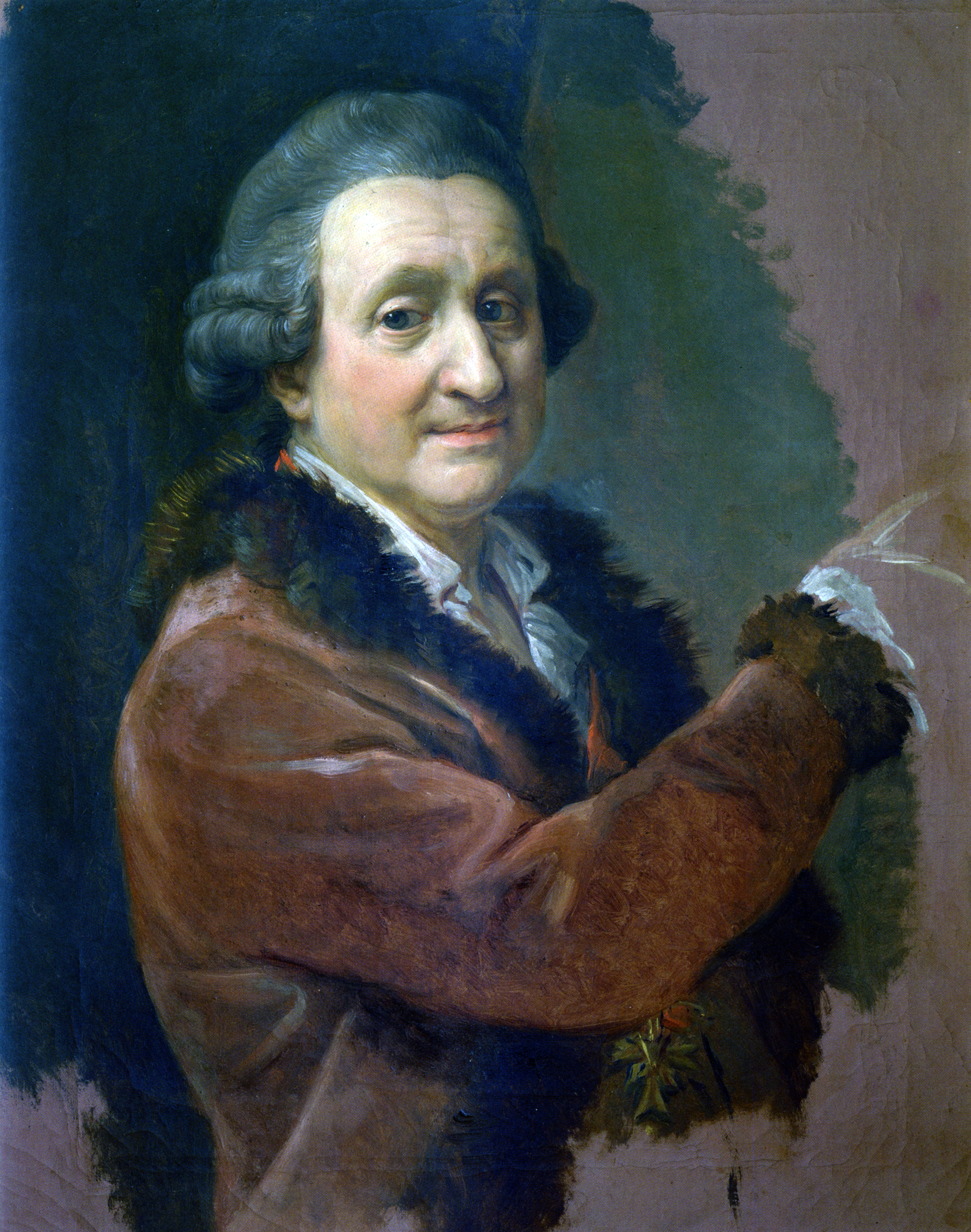
Pompeo Batoni born 25 January

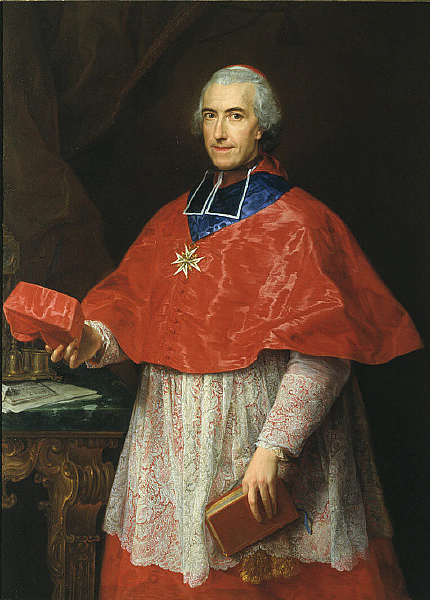
Jean-François-Joseph de Rochechouart born 27 January

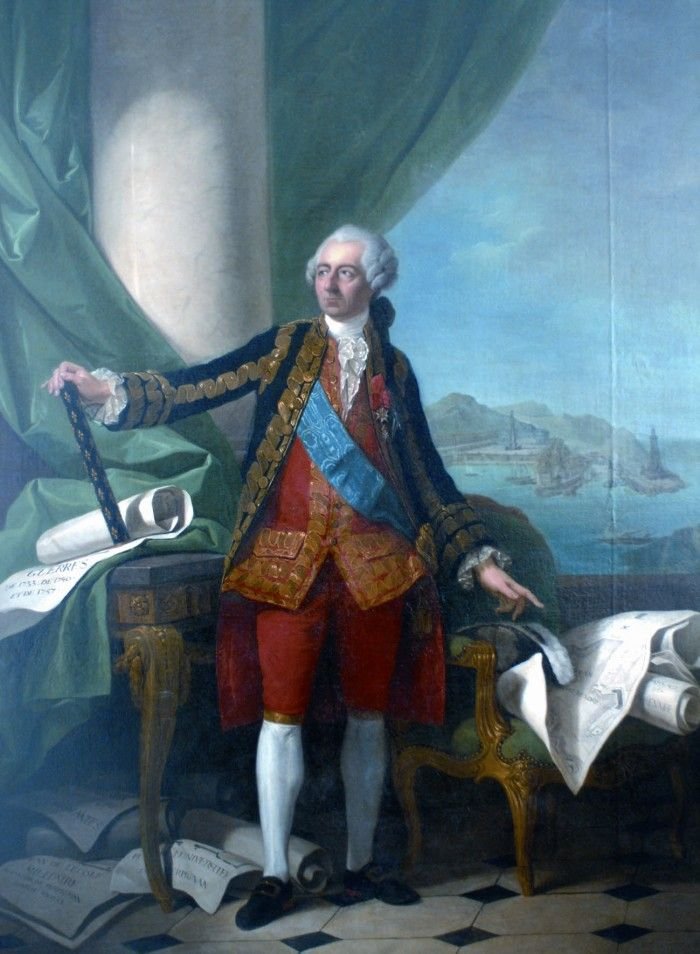
Augustin-Joseph de Mailly born 5 April

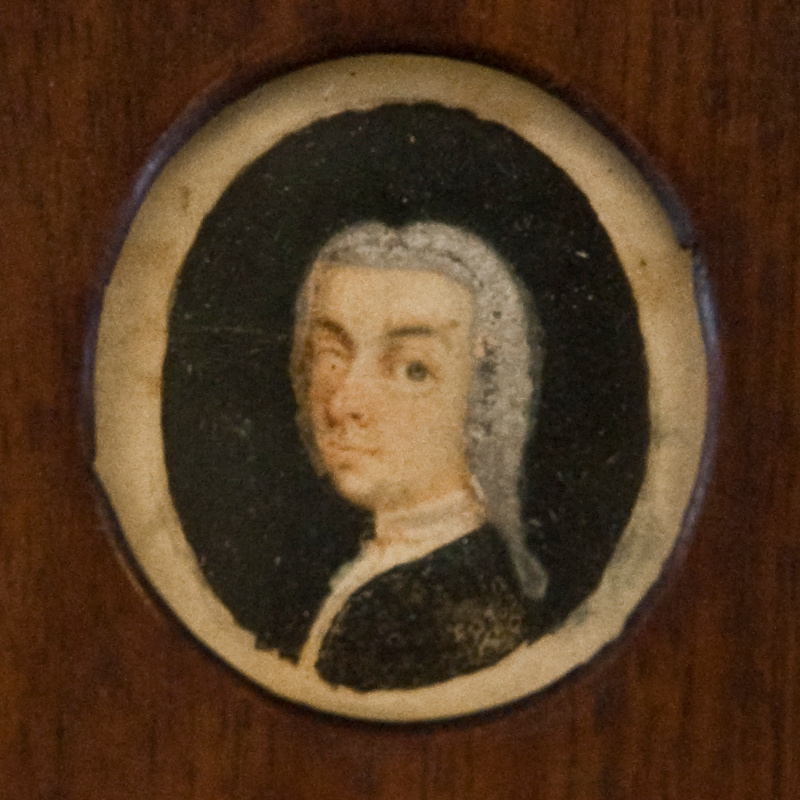
Johann Adolf Scheibe born 5 May

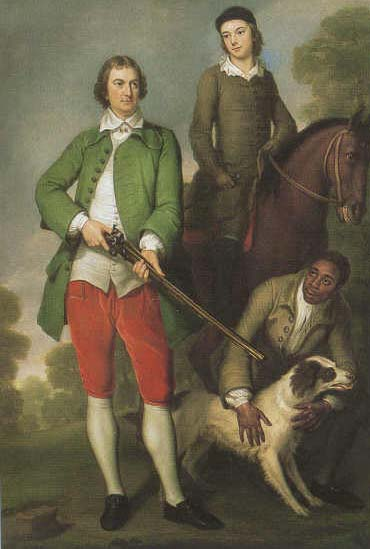
John Spencer born 13 May

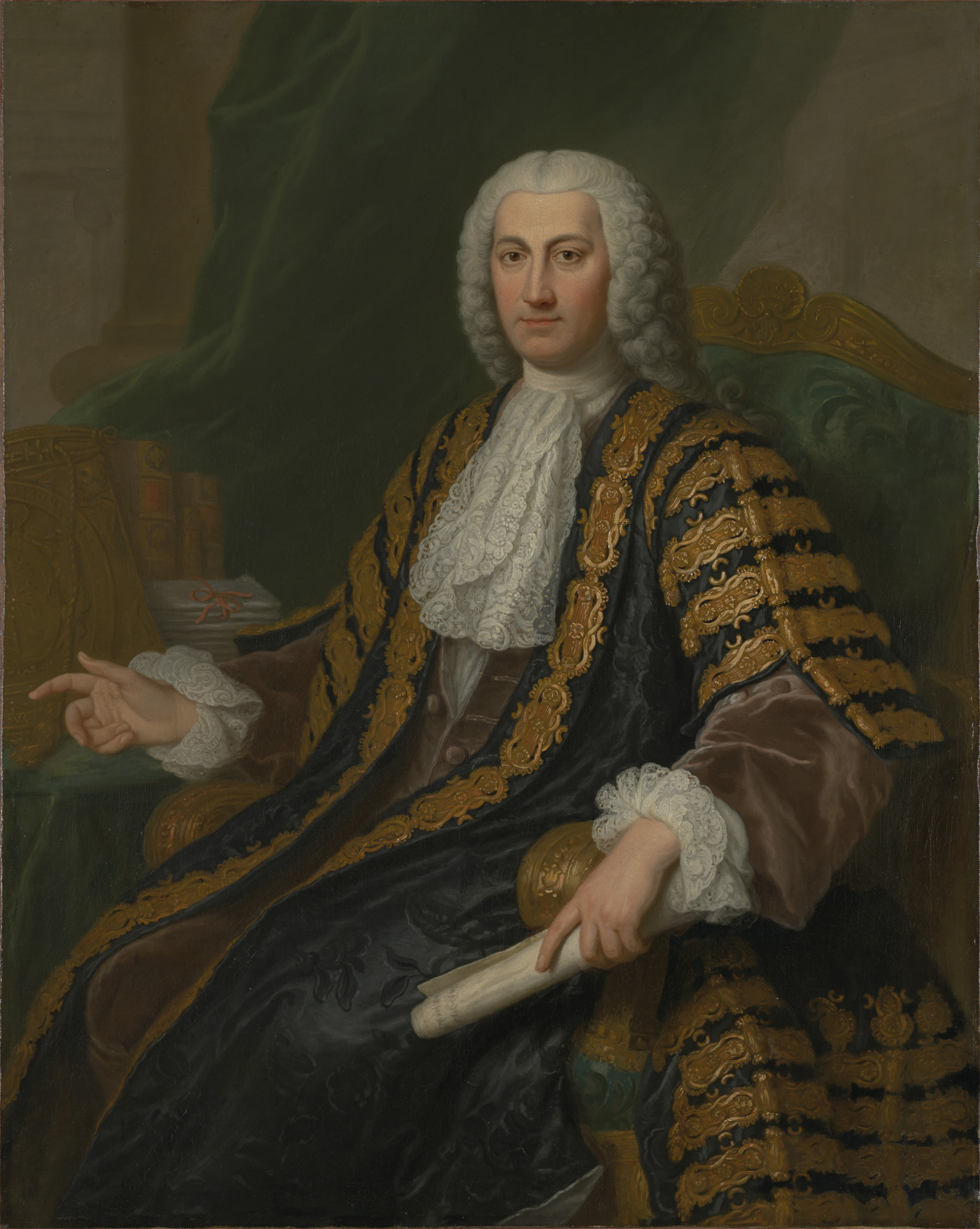
Henry Bilson-Legge born 29 May

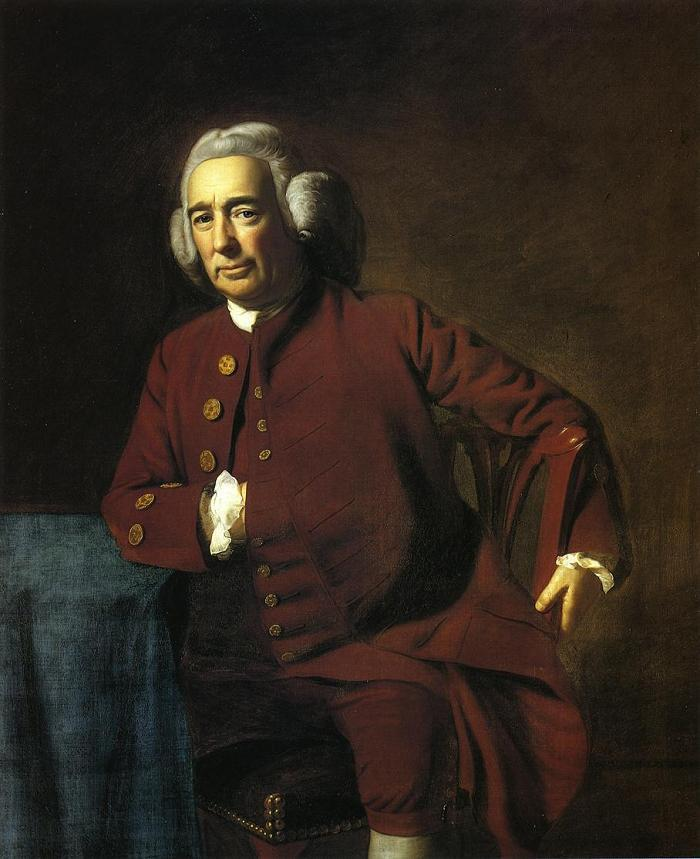
Silvester Gardiner born 29 June

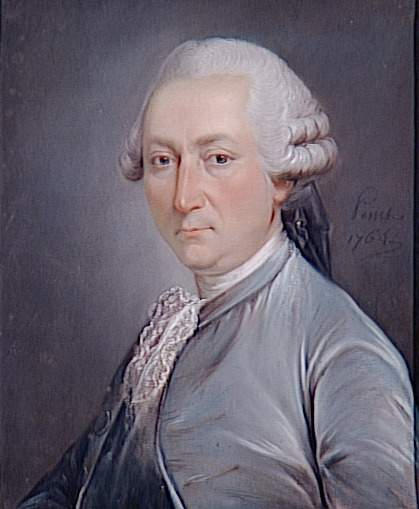
Jean-Rodolphe Perronet born 27 October

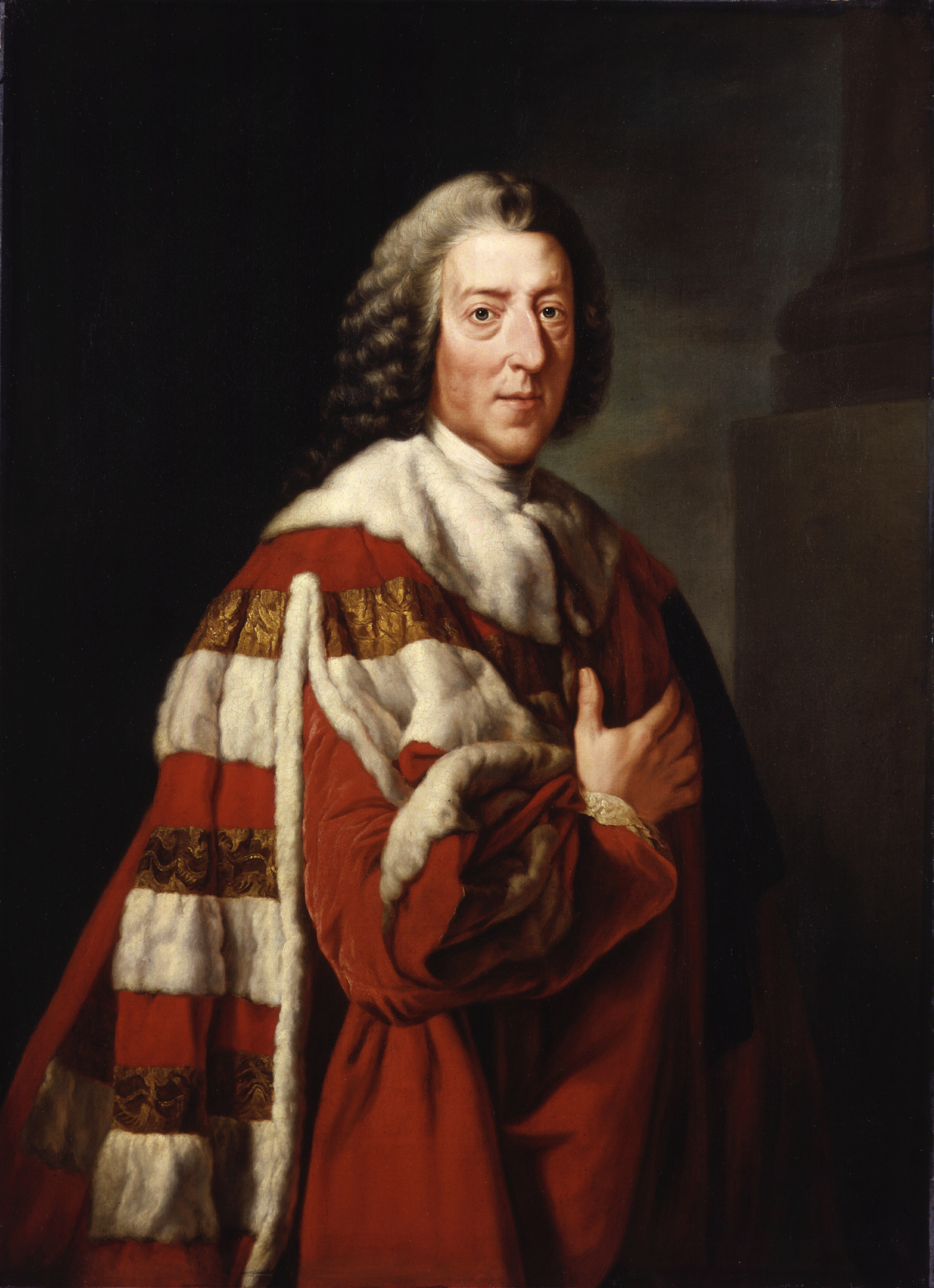
William Pitt, 1st Earl of Chatham born 15 November

=== January–March ===
- January 1 – Anton Wilhelm Plaz, German physician and botanist (d. 1784)
- January 3 – Johannes Van Rensselaer, member of the prominent colonial Van Rensselaer family (d. 1783)
- January 10 – Donat Nonnotte, French painter who specialized in portraiture (d. 1785)
- January 14 – Charles Armand René de La Trémoille, French soldier and president of the States of Brittany (d. 1741)
- January 15 – Giovanni Salvemini, Italian mathematician and astronomer (d. 1791)
- January 17 – Henry Brydges, 2nd Duke of Chandos (d. 1771)
- January 23 – Luigi Crespi, Italian painter (d. 1779)
- January 25 – Pompeo Batoni, Italian painter (d. 1787)
- January 26 – William Hayes, composer (d. 1777)
- January 27
  - Robert Marsham, English naturalist considered to be the founding father of phenology (d. 1797)
  - Jean-François-Joseph de Rochechouart, French Roman Catholic Cardinal (d. 1777)
- January 30 – Georg Dionysius Ehret, botanist and entomologist known for his botanical illustrations (d. 1770)
- February 3 – Johann Michael Hartung, German organ builder and public figure from Dürkheim (d. 1763)
- February 8 – Václav Jan Kopřiva, Bohemian composer and organist (d. 1789)
- February 11 – Egidio Duni, Italian composer who studied in Naples and worked in Italy (d. 1775)
- February 15
  - Alexander Hume-Campbell, Scottish lawyer and politician (d. 1760)
  - Hugh Hume-Campbell, 3rd Earl of Marchmont, Scottish politician (d. 1794)
- February 19 – Scrope Berdmore, English clergyman (d. 1770)
- February 23 – Chauncy Townsend, City of London merchant and a Member of Parliament in the Parliament of Great Britain (d. 1770)
- February 25 – Felix Benda, Bohemian composer and organist (d. 1768)
- February 29
  - Louis Charles du Chaffault de Besné, French naval commander (d. 1794)
  - Peter Jefferson, father of US President Thomas Jefferson (1743–1826) (d. 1757)
- March 5
  - Susanna Boylston, prominent early-American socialite (d. 1797)
  - Moritz Franz Kasimir von Wobersnow, Prussian major general of infantry and a general adjutant of Frederick the Great (d. 1759)
- March 8 – John Campbell, Scottish author (d. 1775)
- March 15 – John Hulse, British Anglican priest (d. 1790)
- March 17 – Johanna Magdalene of Saxe-Weissenfels, Duchess consort of Courland (d. 1760)
- March 22 – Ernst Henrich Berling, German-Danish book printer and publisher (d. 1750)
- March 26 – Robert Rochfort, 1st Earl of Belvedere (d. 1774)
- March 31 – Jean Chastel, farmer and inn-keeper from the province of Gévaudan in France (d. 1790)

=== April–June ===
- April 3
  - Johann Christian Cuno, German poet (d. 1783)
  - Antoine-Gaspard Boucher d'Argis, French lawyer (d. 1791)
- April 6 – Johann Georg Reutter, Austrian composer (d. 1772)
- April 12 – Rose Fuller, West Indies plantation owner and politician (d. 1777)
- April 18 – James Cholmondeley, British Army officer and Member of Parliament between 1731 and 1747 (d. 1775)
- April 23 – Friedrich von Hagedorn, German poet (d. 1754)
- April 25 – John Seccombe, author (d. 1792)
- April 28 – Johann Rudolf Engau, German jurist (d. 1755)
- May 1 – Lionel Tollemache, 4th Earl of Dysart (d. 1770)
- May 5 – Johann Adolf Scheibe, German-Danish composer and significant critic and theorist of music (d. 1776)
- May 8 – Girolamo Colonna di Sciarra, Italian Catholic Cardinal of the noble Colonna di Sciarra family (d. 1763)
- May 13
  - Maximilian Friedrich von Königsegg-Rothenfels, Archbishop-Elector of Cologne and the Bishop of Münster from 1761 to 1784 (d. 1784)
  - John Spencer, British nobleman and politician (d. 1746)
- May 25 – Wriothesley Russell, 3rd Duke of Bedford, English nobleman and peer (d. 1732)
- May 29 – Henry Bilson-Legge, English statesman and three times as Chancellor of the Exchequer (d. 1764)
- May 30 – Daniel Gralath, physicist and a mayor of Danzig (d. 1767)
- June 5 – Roger Townshend, British soldier and Member of Parliament (d. 1760)
- June 17 – Annibale degli Abati Olivieri, Italian archaeologist (d. 1789)
- June 19 – Johann Gottlieb Janitsch, German Baroque composer (d. 1763)
- June 20 – François-Élie Vincent, French painter of portrait miniatures (d. 1790)
- June 24 – Sir Henry Harpur, 5th Baronet, English baronet and politician (d. 1748)
- June 25 – Nicolas Antoine II Coulon de Villiers, French military officer in the King George's War (d. 1750)
- June 29 – Silvester Gardiner, physician (d. 1786)

=== July–September ===
- July 5 – Thomas Phillips, English Jesuit priest (d. 1774)
- July 8
  - Claude-Henri de Fusée de Voisenon, French playwright and writer (d. 1775)
  - Johann Jakob Zeiller, Austrian painter (d. 1783)
- July 10 – Johannes Enschedé, Dutch printer (d. 1780)
- July 17 – Frederick Christian, Margrave of Brandenburg-Bayreuth, member of the House of Hohenzollern (d. 1769)
- July 19 – Philip Francis, Anglo-Irish clergyman and writer (d. 1773)
- July 22 – Nathaniel Ames, Colonial American physician (d. 1764)
- August 26
  - Pierre-Joseph Bernard, French military man and salon poet with the reputation of a rake (d. 1775)
  - Matteo Capranica, Italian composer (d. 1776)
- August 29 – Olof von Dalin, Swedish nobleman (d. 1763)
- August 31 – Sir John Rogers, 3rd Baronet (d. 1773)
- September 2 – André le Breton, French publisher (d. 1779)
- September 4 – Jean-Baptiste Nicolas Roch de Ramezay, officer of the marines, colonial administrator for New France (d. 1777)
- September 6 – Charles Stanhope, Member of Parliament (MP) for Derby (d. 1736)
- September 9 – Paul Egede, Dano-Norwegian theologian (d. 1789)
- September 10 – Mathias Collett, Norwegian civil servant (d. 1759)
- September 16 – Catharina Freymann, Norwegian educator and pietist leader (d. 1791)
- September 24 – Manuel Rojo del Río y Vieyra, Archbishop of Manila (d. 1764)
- September 25 – Thomas Wood, British politician and MP (d. 1799)
- September 26 – Ignatius Sichelbart, German-Bohemian Jesuit missionary and painter (d. 1780)

=== October–December ===
- October 2 – William Sutherland, 17th Earl of Sutherland (d. 1750)
- October 4 – Antonio Francesco Vezzosi, Italian Theatine and biographical writer (d. 1783)
- October 5 – Johann Christoph Petzold, German sculptor who mainly worked in Denmark (d. 1762)
- October 9 – Louis César de La Baume Le Blanc, French nobleman, bibliophile and military man (d. 1780)
- October 12 – John Wall, English physician (d. 1776)
- October 16 – Albrecht von Haller, Swiss anatomist and physiologist (d. 1777)
- October 20 – Francis Webber, Anglican priest (d. 1771)
- October 22
  - Antoine-François, marquis de Lambertye, French aristocrat of the Ancien Régime (d. 1777)
  - Louis Günther II, Prince of Schwarzburg-Rudolstadt (d. 1790)
  - Frederic Louis Norden, Danish naval captain and explorer (d. 1742)
- October 27
  - Hill Boothby, English friend and late love of Samuel Johnson (d. 1756)
  - Jean-Rodolphe Perronet, French architect and structural engineer (d. 1794)
- November 7
  - William Plumsted, mayor of Philadelphia in 1750 (d. 1765)
  - Henry Rolle, 1st Baron Rolle (d. 1750)
- November 15 – William Pitt, 1st Earl of Chatham, Prime Minister of Great Britain (d. 1778)
- November 16 – Gregorio Babbi, Italian operatic tenor (d. 1768)
- November 28 – Sir John Frederick, 4th Baronet, British politician (d. 1783)
- November 30 – Antoine de Laurès, French poet and playwright from Languedoc (d. 1779)
- December 2
  - Theodorick Bland of Cawsons, clerk of the court of Prince George County, Virginia (d. 1784)
  - Marianus Königsperger, German composer, organist and Catholic Monk of the Benedictine Order (d. 1769)
- December 3 – Alessandro Ruspoli, 2nd Prince of Cerveteri, 2nd Principe di Cerveteri (d. 1779)
- December 6 – Christopher Dufrost de La Jemeraye, Canadian explorer and cartographer (d. 1736)
- December 8
  - Francis I, Holy Roman Emperor (d. 1765)
  - Sir Charles Hanbury Williams, Welsh diplomat, writer and satirist (d. 1759)
- December 10
  - John Poulett, 2nd Earl Poulett (d. 1764)
  - Peregrine Poulett, British politician and MP (d. 1752)
- December 16 – Robert Livingston, third and final Lord of Livingston Manor (d. 1790)
- December 18 – John Collier, English caricaturist and satirical poet aka Tim Bobbin (d. 1786)
- December 28 – Sigmund von Haimhausen, Bavarian aristocrat (d. 1793)
- date unknown
  - Baal Shem of London, German-born Kabbalist (d. 1782)
  - Richard Dawes, English classical scholar (d. 1766)
  - Elizabeth Scott, British-American poet, hymnwriter (d. 1776)

== Deaths ==
- January 31 – Friedrich Seyler, Swiss theologian (b. 1642)
- March 5 – William Beveridge, English Bishop of St. Asaph (b. 1637)
- March 15 – William Walsh, English/British politician (b. 1662)
- March 19 – Samuel Rodigast, German poet, hymnwriter (b. 1649)
- April 5 – Christian Heinrich, Margrave of Brandenburg-Bayreuth-Kulmbach, German prince (b. 1661)
- April 17 – Jacques Gravier, French Jesuit missionary in the New World (b. 1651)
- April 20 – Damaris Cudworth Masham, English philosopher (b. 1659)
- April 23 – Christian Augustus, Count Palatine of Sulzbach (1632–1708) (b. 1622)
- May 6 – François de Laval, first bishop of New France (b. 1623)
- May 11 – Jules Hardouin-Mansart, French Baroque architect (b. 1646)
- May 12 – Adolphus Frederick II, Duke of Mecklenburg-Strelitz (b. 1658)
- June 5 – Ignatius George II, Syriac Orthodox Patriarch of Antioch (b. 1648)
- June 21 – John Hamilton, 2nd Lord Belhaven and Stenton, Scottish politician (b. 1656)
- June 28 – Melchor Liñán y Cisneros, Spanish Catholic archbishop (b. 1629)
- June 30 – Emperor Tekle Haymanot I of Ethiopia (stabbed to death) (b. 1706)
- July 5 – Ferdinando Carlo Gonzaga, Duke of Mantua and Montferrat, only child of Duke Charles II (b. 1652)
- July 10 – James Kendall, English soldier, politician (b. 1647)
- July 21 – Conrad von Reventlow, Danish statesman and the first Grand Chancellor of Denmark (b. 1644)
- August 1 – Edward Tyson, British scientist (b. 1651)
- September 6 – Sir John Morden, 1st Baronet, English merchant and philanthropist (b. 1623)
- September 19 – Francis Newport, 1st Earl of Bradford, English politician (b. 1620)
- September 29 – Sir James Oxenden, 2nd Baronet, English politician (b. 1641)
- October 1 – John Blow, British composer (b. 1649)
- October 2 – Anne Jules de Noailles, French general (b. 1650)

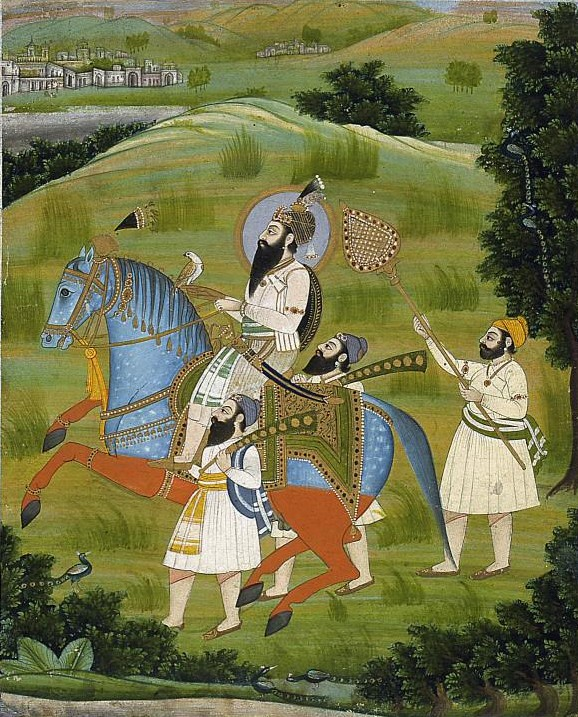
Guru Gobind Singh

- October 7 – Guru Gobind Singh, 10th Guru Sahib of Sikhism, social reformist, poet and revolutionary (b. 1666)
- October 9 – Olympia Mancini, French courtier (b. 1638)
- October 10 – David Gregory, Scottish astronomer (b. 1659)
- October 11 – Ehrenfried Walther von Tschirnhaus, German mathematician (b. 1651)
- October 21 – Christian Weise, German writer, dramatist, poet, pedagogue and librarian (b. 1642)
- October 22
  - Cesare Pronti, Italian painter (b. 1626)
  - Hermann Witsius, Dutch theologian (b. 1636)
- October 24 – Seki Kōwa, Japanese mathematician (b. c. 1640)
- October 28 – Prince George of Denmark, consort of Anne, Queen of Great Britain (b. 1653)
- October 31 – Nathaniel Higginson, English politician (b. 1652)
- November 3 – Countess Henriette Catherine of Nassau, daughter of Frederick Henry (b. 1637)
- November 10 – David Makeléer, Swedish politician (b. 1646)
- November 13 – Charles, Count of Marsan, French noble (b. 1648)
- November 16 – Alexander Edward, Scottish landscape architect (b. 1651)
- November 17 – Ludolf Bakhuizen, Dutch painter (b. 1631)
- December 16
  - Juan Ortega y Montañés, Spanish Catholic bishop, colonial administrator in Guatemala and New Spain (b. 1627)
  - Nicolas Pasquin, early pioneer in New France (now Quebec) (b. 1648)
- December 22 – Hedvig Sophia of Sweden, Swedish princess (b. 1681)
- December 28 – Joseph Pitton de Tournefort, French botanist (b. 1656)
- date unknown
  - Anna Maria Clodt, Swedish courtier (b. ?)
  - Joaquim Juncosa, Carthusian monk and Baroque painter (b. 1631)
