= List of longest masonry arch bridge spans =

The masonry arch bridges of stone or brick are the most genuine of arch bridges, some lasting a thousand years. Because they are made of worked stone, there is a slight chance they might even stand without mortar, like the Pont du Gard aqueduct. Yet arch bridges using rough hewn stones like Changhong Bridge need mortar to stand. Arches with a core of reinforced concrete covered by facade stone for decoration are not to be included in this list, the load-bearing part of the arch should be cut stone or brick, or as follows, unreinforced concrete.

In a closed spandrel stone arch bridge the hollow space can be filled with rubble and loose material. It can also be filled with concrete, in which case the filling itself becomes able to bear load in addition to the load carried by the ring of voussoirs. If the voussoir stones are thin they cannot take much weight so instead it is the concrete filling that becomes the structural part of the arch. The next step is to remove the voussoir stones completely, or only use them as facade stones. An unreinforced concrete arch is technically a masonry arch that use only very small stones, that is the aggregate of the concrete, sand and gravel. Such an arch would not stand without mortar.

Some modern bridges are built masonry style with precast concrete blocks, like Gladesville Bridge that has a span of 305 metres (1000 ft). These types are not in this list because their blocks are most likely made of reinforced concrete, that may make the assembled arch to have more in common with a modern reinforced concrete arch than a stone masonry arch.

The Maidenhead Railway Bridge may have the two longest arches made of bricks, 39 metres (128 ft).

Building new masonry arch bridges today is a solely Chinese business. There are 18 stone arch bridges with spans exceeding 100 m (330 ft). There are probably several dozens of stone arches exceeding 40m in the Fujian province only. Almost all bridges were built after 1950.

This list contains the longest masonry arch spans ever built being at least 50 metres (164 ft).

Rank	Name	Span metres	Span feet	Note	Year opened	Location	Country	Ref
1	Danhe Bridge 丹河大桥	146 m	479 ft	Concrete deck	2001	Jincheng, Shanxi; 35°28′15.0″N 112°59′43.0″E	China	
2	Wuchaohe Bridge 乌巢河大桥	120 m	394 ft	Concrete deck	1990	Fenghuang County, Hunan; 28°04′42.3″N 109°23′58.7″E	China	
3	Jiuxigou Bridge 九溪溝橋	116 m	381 ft	Concrete deck	1972	Fengdu County, Chongqing; 29°47′09.1″N 107°49′27.9″E	China	
4	Changhong Bridge 长虹桥	112 m	367 ft		1961	Kaiyuan, Yunnan; 23°48′55.9″N 103°16′34.4″E	China	
5	Fushun Tuojiang Bridge 富顺红旗大桥	111 m	364 ft		1968	Fushun County, Sichuan; 29°10′57.8″N 105°00′22.1″E	China	
6	Shengli Bridge	108 m	354 ft		1989		China	
7	First Sizhuang Bridge	108 m	354 ft		1996		China	
8	Xianfeng Aqueduct Bridge 险峰渡槽	106 m	348 ft		1976	Ci County, Hebei; 36°25′01.6″N 114°05′23.7″E	China	
9	Huwan Bridge	105 m	344 ft		1972	Henan	China	
10	New Tongshan Bridge	105 m	344 ft		1977		China	
11	First Danhe Bridge	105 m	344 ft		1983		China	
12	Jiangpinghe Bridge	105 m	344 ft		1990		China	
13	Yugong Bridge	102 m	335 ft		1970		China	
14	Gongtan Bridge	100 m	328 ft		1954		China	
15	Youduhe Bridge 游渡河大桥	100 m	328 ft		1973	Jiangjin District, Chongqing; 28°52′23.4″N 106°20′12.4″E	China	
16	Hongdu Bridge 红渡桥	100 m	328 ft		1977	Mashan County - Du'an County, Guangxi; 23°50′29.2″N 108°09′04.1″E	China	
17	Longwu Bridge	100 m	328 ft		1979	Guangxi	China	
18	Fujin Bridge	100 m	328 ft		2003		China	
19	Jianjin Bridge	100 m	328 ft				China	
20	Daliushu Bridge	100 m	328 ft				China	
21	Jin-shan Bridge 金山大桥	99 m	325 ft		1972	Hua'an County, Fujian; 24°55′23.7″N 117°30′16.7″E	China	
22	Xiaoduchuan Bridge 现有红江桥	97 m	318 ft		1970	Enshi City, Hubei; 30°17′50.7″N 109°28′45.2″E	China	
23	Pont de la Libération	96 m	315 ft	Unreinforced concrete arches Concrete deck	1919	Villeneuve-sur-Lot, Lot-et-Garonne; 44°24′17.2″N 0°42′20.5″E	France	
24	Syratal Viaduct	90 m	295 ft		1905	Plauen, Saxony; 50°29′56.4″N 12°07′35.8″E	Germany	
25	Longmen Bridge 龙门大桥	90 m	295 ft	Two 60-meter side spans	1961	Luoyang, Henan; 34°33′33.0″N 112°28′21.4″E	China	
26	Solkan Bridge	85 m	279 ft	Destroyed in 1916; Rebuilt in 1927; Longest masonry arch railway bridge	1906	Nova Gorica, Goriška; 45°58′43.5″N 13°39′06.3″E	Slovenia	
27	Adolphe Bridge	84 m	276 ft	Concrete deck	1904	Luxembourg City; 49°36′30.5″N 6°07′36.9″E	Luxembourg	
28	Bridge of Stones; Pont des Pierres	80 m	262 ft	Destroyed in 1944	1910	Montanges, Ain; 46°09′55.0″N 5°48′40.3″E	France	
29	Roizonne Viaduct	79 m	259 ft		1928	La Mure, Isère; 44°54′51.0″N 5°49′44.7″E	France	
30	Trezzo sull'Adda Bridge	72 m	236 ft	Destroyed in 1416	1377	Trezzo sull'Adda, Lombardy; 45°36′43.8″N 9°31′24.7″E	Italy	
31	Steyrling Bridge	70 m	230 ft		1904	Steyrling, Upper Austria; 47°48′15.4″N 14°09′47.5″E	Austria	
32	Sidi Rached Bridge	68 m	223 ft		1912	Constantine, Constantine Province; 36°21′45.1″N 6°36′49.6″E	Algeria	
33	Union Arch Bridge	67 m	220 ft		1864	Cabin John, Maryland; 38°58′22.1″N 77°08′54.8″W	United States	
34	Sonnborner Eisenbahnbrücke	66 m	217 ft		1914	Wuppertal, North Rhine-Westphalia; 51°14′30.4″N 7°06′11.3″E	Germany	
35	Veresk Bridge	66 m	217 ft		1936	Veresk, Mazandaran Province; 35°54′12.0″N 52°59′24.9″E	Iran	
36	Gutach Bridge	64 m	210 ft		1900	Lenzkirch, Baden-Württemberg; 47°53′00.4″N 8°15′08.0″E	Germany	
37	Kempten Iller Road Bridge	64 m	210 ft	Tamped concrete arch	1906	Kempten, Bavaria; 47°42′54.9″N 10°19′19.1″E	Germany	
38	Kempten Iller Railway Bridge	64 m	210 ft	Tamped concrete arch	1906	Kempten, Bavaria; 47°42′53.2″N 10°19′19.7″E	Germany	
39	La Balme Bridge	64 m	210 ft		1946	Peyrieu, Ain - La Balme, Savoie; 45°42′32.3″N 5°43′36.3″E	France	
40	Luitpold Bridge	63 m	207 ft		1901	Munich, Bavaria; 48°08′30.2″N 11°35′42.7″E	Germany	
41	Max-Joseph Bridge	63 m	207 ft		1902	Munich, Bavaria; 48°08′57.0″N 11°35′54.7″E	Germany	
42	Grosvenor Bridge	61 m	200 ft		1832	Chester, North West England; 53°11′00.9″N 2°53′46.0″W	United Kingdom	
43	Lavaur Viaduct	61 m	200 ft		1884	Lavaur, Tarn; 43°42′11.8″N 1°49′26.5″E	France	
44	Pont du Gour Noir	60 m	197 ft		1889	Uzerche - Saint-Ybard, Corrèze; 45°25′10.0″N 1°32′01.0″E	France	
45	Wechselburg-Göhrer Bridge	60 m	197 ft		1904	Wechselburg, Saxony; 50°58′46.3″N 12°45′52.2″E	Germany	
46	Orkla Bridge	60 m	197 ft		1921	Rennebu, Trøndelag; 62°43′30.4″N 9°59′49.7″E	Norway	
47	Huanghugang Bridge 黄虎港大桥	60 m	197 ft		1959	Hupingshanzhen, Hunan; 29°55′41.2″N 110°47′31.6″E	China	
48	Wallstraßenbrücke	57 m	187 ft	Tamped concrete arch Destroyed in 1945	1905	Ulm, Baden-Württemberg	Germany	
49	Skodje Bridge	57 m	187 ft		1922	Ålesund, Møre og Romsdal; 62°30′09.1″N 6°36′59.6″E	Norway	
50	Escot Viaduct	56 m	184 ft		1909	Escot, Pyrénées-Atlantiques; 43°04′14.0″N 0°36′21.6″W	France	
51	Ballochmyle Viaduct	55 m	180 ft		1848	Mauchline - Catrine, East Ayrshire; 55°29′58.1″N 4°21′44.7″W	United Kingdom	
52	Wiesen Viaduct	55 m	180 ft		1909	Davos Wiesen, Grisons; 46°41′39.9″N 9°42′46.3″E	Switzerland	
53	Pélussin Viaduct	55 m	180 ft		1919	Pélussin, Loire; 45°24′57.0″N 4°40′43.3″E	France	
54	Rabastens Bridge	55 m (x2)	180 ft (x2)	Concrete deck	1924	Rabastens - Coufouleux, Tarn; 43°49′11.7″N 1°43′35.5″E	France	
55	Pont de Vieille-Brioude	54 m	177 ft	Destroyed many times Rebuilt in 1832 with 45 meters span	1479	Vieille-Brioude, Haute-Loire; 45°15′38.2″N 3°24′30.6″E	France	
56	Jora Bridge	54 m	177 ft		1918	Dombås, Innlandet; 62°05′35.3″N 9°06′19.5″E	Norway	
57	Yixiantian Bridge 一线天桥	54 m	177 ft	Concrete deck	1966	Hanyuan County, Sichuan; 29°18′24.1″N 102°57′04.3″E	China	
58	Gignac Bridge	50 m	164 ft		1810	Gignac, Hérault; 43°39′13.2″N 3°32′08.0″E	France	
59	Nogent-sur-Marne Viaduct	50 m (x4)	164 ft (x4)	Destroyed during the World War II	1856	Nogent-sur-Marne, Val-de-Marne; 48°49′55.9″N 2°29′48.3″E	France	
60	Munderkingen Bridge	50 m	164 ft	Tamped concrete arch Destroyed in 1945	1893	Munderkingen, Baden-Württemberg; 48°14′13.8″N 9°38′37.2″E	Germany	
61	Eaux-salées Viaduct	50 m	164 ft		1914	Carry-le-Rouet, Bouches-du-Rhône; 43°19′58.1″N 5°11′06.2″E	France	
62	Tveitsund Bridge	50 m	164 ft		1918	Treungen, Telemark; 59°01′03.9″N 8°31′28.4″E	Norway	
63	Baisha Bridge 白沙大桥	50 m (x2)	164 ft (x2)		1960	Jiande, Zhejiang; 29°28′12.8″N 119°16′43.1″E	China	

== See also ==
- List of longest arch bridge spans
- List of spans (list of remarkable permanent wire spans)
