= Marianus Königsperger =

German composer, organist and Catholic Monk

Marianus Königsperger (also called Johann Erhard Königsberger) born 2 December 1708 in Roding (Oberpfalz); and died 9 October 1769 in the Prüfening Abbey at Regensburg) was a German composer, organist and Catholic monk of the Benedictine Order.

== Works ==
- Vocal music
  - 33 Cantilenae sacrae for voices, 2 Violins and Organ op. 1, Lotter, Augsburg 1733
  - 10 Missae solemnes and 2 Missae pastoritiae such as 1 Veni Sancte Spiritus op. 1, Lang, Regensburg 1740
  - 8 Offertories op. 2, Lang, Regensburg 1741
  - 6 Miserere and 2 Stabat Mater op. 3, Klaffschenkel, Augsburg 1743
  - 6 Missae op. 4, Lotter, Augsburg 1743
  - 4 Vespern and 4 marianische Antiphonen op. 5, Klaffschenkel, Augsburg 1743
  - 6 Missae rurales and 2 Requiem for 2 Voices and Basso continuo, other Strings and Instruments ad libitum op. 6, Klaffschenkel, Augsburg 1744
  - 6 solenne Litaneien op. 7, Klaffschenkel, Augsburg 1744
  - 17 Offertorien op. 8, Lotter, Augsburg 1744
  - 6 Missae solemniores and 1 Te Deum op. 10, Klaffschenkel, Augsburg 1747
  - 6 Stabat Mater op. 11, Lotter, Augsburg 1748
  - 4 Stationen zum Fest Corporis Christi, 8 Hymnen, 1 Offertorium, 1 Aria de passione and 1 Te Deum op. 12, Lotter, Augsburg 1748
  - 17 Vesperpsalmen, 1 Magnificat and 4 marianische Antiphonen for 2 Voices and Basso continuo, other voices and Instruments ad libitum op. 13, Lotter, Augsburg 1749 (2. Auflage 1755)
  - 3 Vesperpsalmen and 4 marianische Antiphonen op. 14, Lotter, Augsburg 1750
  - 6 Missae solemniores and 1 Veni Sancte Spiritus op. 15, Lotter, Augsburg 1750
  - 6 solenne Litaneien op. 17, Lotter, Augsburg 1753
  - 6 rurale Litaneien and 4 Arien for 2 Voices and Basso continuo, other Voices and Instruments ad libitum op. 19, Lotter, Augsburg 1755
  - 2 Requiem and 2 Libera op. 20, Lotter, Augsburg 1756
  - 6 Missae solemnes op. 21, Schmid, Regensburg 1760
  - 10 Kantaten op. 22, Lotter, Augsburg 1763
  - 5 Missae solemnes and 1 Requiem op. 23, Lotter, Augsburg 1764
  - 2 Vespern and 4 marianische Antiphonen op. 24, Lotter, Augsburg 1767
  - 2 Missae, 2 Offertorien and 1 Te Deum op. 25, Lotter, Augsburg 1767
  - 1 Offertorium without opus number, Lotter, Augsburg 1756
  - 1 Offertorium duplicis textus (»Pater noster / Benedictus sancta trinitas«) without opus number, Lotter, Augsburg 1757
  - 1 Missa pastoritia for 4 Voices, 2 Violins, 2 Trumpets and Violoncello without opus number, Lotter, Augsburg 1769
  - Vespern and 4 Antiphonen in C, F, G and C, without opus number and without year.
  - 3 Vespern and 4 Antiphonen in C, G, F and C, without opus number and without year.
  - 1 Alma redemptoris mater D-Dur
  - 1 Ave Regina for Bass Voice, 2 Violins, 2 Horns and double Bass continuo
  - 1 Credidi C-Dur
  - 1 Cum invocarem
  - 1 Litaniae C-Dur
  - 1 Lythania C-Dur
  - Lythaniae solennes C-Dur
  - Litaniae C-Dur
  - 1 Messe F-Dur for Sopran, Alt ad libitum, Bass Voice and Organ
  - 1 Messe g-Moll for Soprano, Alt, Bass ad libitum and Organ
  - 1 Missa pastoritia D-Dur
  - 1 Salve Regina D-Dur
- Works for the theater
  - Bellisarius, die von dem Neyd verfinsterte Welt-Ehr, Amberg 1736
  - Libertas in Captivitate, Amberg 1736
  - Inconstantia Humani Favoris, Amberg 1736
  - Lumen Fidei, Amberg 1736
  - Gering-Schätzung der Marianischen Versamblung, mit unglückseligem Tod bestrafet, Amberg 1736
  - Virtus in pueris adulta, Amberg Mai 1736
  - Maria, eine sichere Zuflucht-Statt der Sünder, Amberg 1737
  - Sanctus Laurentius Justinianus, Amberg 1737
  - Mater Sanctae Spei, Amberg 1737
  - Fabula Saturnalitia, Amberg 1737
  - Codrus Atheniensium Rex amoris victima, Amberg 1737
  - Mira Amoris Metamorphosis, Amberg 1737
  - Rodericus De Spina ex Rosa, Amberg 1737
  - Alphonsus suimet victor. Das ist Glorreicher Sieg Alphonsi über sich selbst, Dillingen 4. September 1737
  - Gloriosa filii in Parentem pietas, Amberg 1738
  - Filialis amor Deiparae, Ingolstadt 18. Mai 1738
  - Mater gratiae, Ingolstadt 11. Januar 1739
  - S. Rainerius noxii pudoris victor, Ingolstadt 10. Mai 1739
  - Dem Leben eines bösen Sodalis gemäßer Tod, 1739
  - Mater gratiae, München 10. November 1743
  - Alphonsus Magnus Se ipso major, undated
  - S. Rainerius sacrilegi pudoris victor, München 1745
  - Abraham sich zweymal schlachtend, undated
  - Priflinga in anniversaria solennitate, 1761
  - Salomon rex sapientia a Deo collata, 1763
- Instrumental Music
  - 12 Sonates concertantes for solo Violin, 2 Violins, Viola and Double Bass continuo op. 9, Klaffschenkel, Augsburg 1745
  - 10 Symphoniae for Strings and obligatto Organ, 2 Trompets and Drums ad libitum op. 16, 1751
  - 6 Konzerte and 2 Pastorellen for Organ und obligatto Strings, 2 Trumpets or Horns ad libitum op. 18, 1754
  - Praeambulum cum fuga primi, secundi, tertii, quarti toni for Organ, 1755
  - Praeambulum cum fuga sexti, septimi, octavi toni for Organ, 1756
  - Praeambulum cum fuga primi (-octavi) toni, 1756
  - Finger-Streit oder Clavier-Übung durch ein Praeambulum und Fugen, so mit scharfen, harten und weichen Tonen vermengt, 1760
  - Der wohl-unterwiesene Clavier-Schüler, 1755, 2. Auflage 1761, 3. Auflage 1772.

== Literature ==
- M. A. Radice: The Nature of the Style Galant: Evidence from the Repertoire, in: Musical Quarterly Nr. 83, 1999, Edition 4, pages 607–647
