= Johann Rudolf Engau =

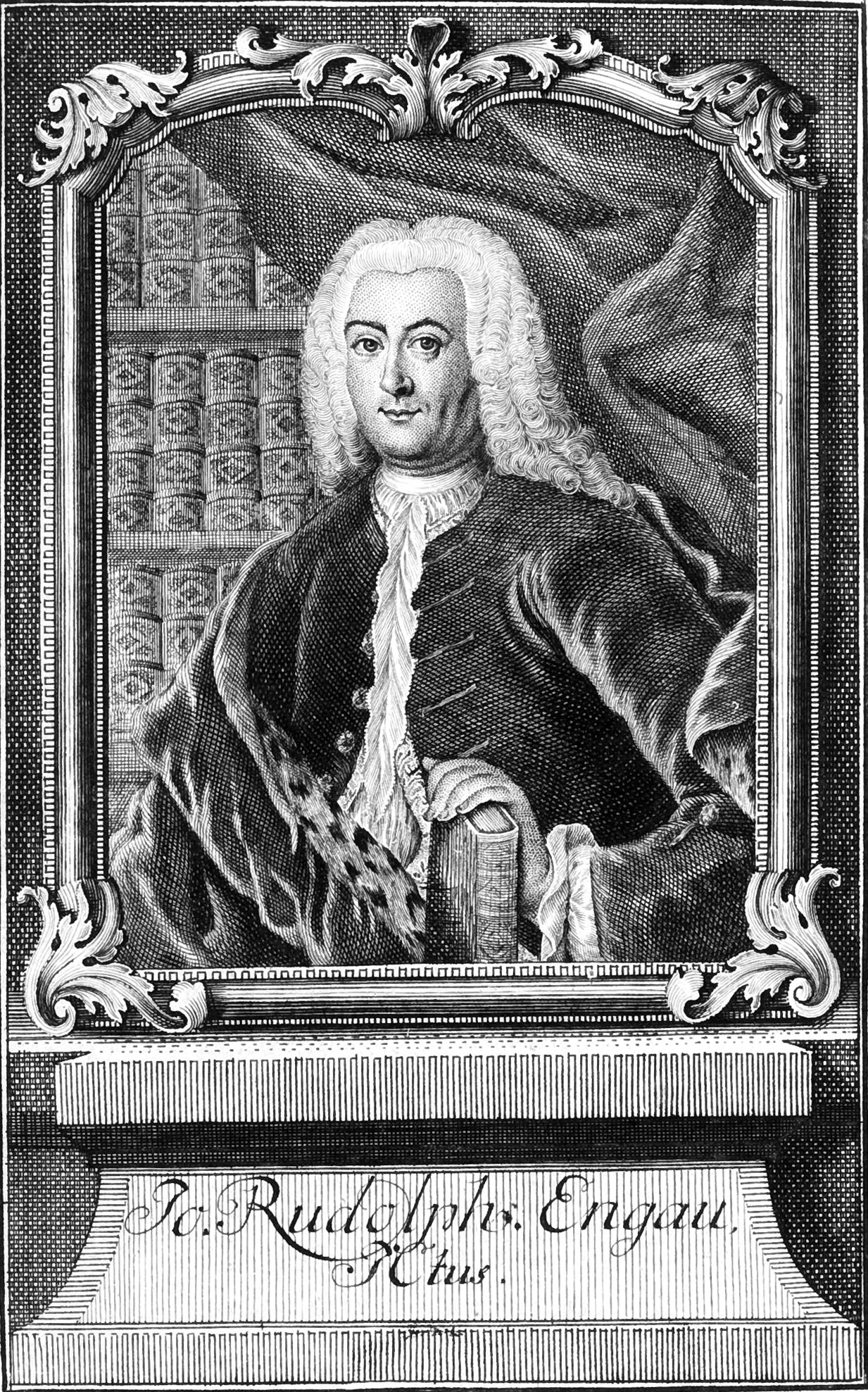
Official portrait of Johann-Rudolph-Engau

Johann Rudolf Engau (28 April 1708 – 18 January 1755) was a German jurist.

Engau was born in Erfurt. He entered the University of Jena in 1726, and earned a doctorate of law from there in 1734. In 1738 he became extraordinary professor at Jena, and in 1740 became full professor as well as assessor for the magistrates' court (Schöffenstuhl).

In 1743 he was promoted to Institute Professor and assessor for the regional court (Landgericht); in 1746 became chair of the law faculty; and in 1748 Hofrat. His major publications were compendiums of German private, criminal, and canon law.

== Works ==
- Elementa iuris Germanici civilis (1736; 4th ed. 1752)
- Elementa iuris criminalis Germanico Carolini (1738; 7th ed. with notes by J. A. Hellfeld, 1777)
- Elementa iuris canonico pontificio ecclesiastici (1739; 5th ed. 1765)
- Decisiones et responsa iuris selecta (1761)
