= Catharina Freymann =

Norwegian educator and pietist leader

Catharina Freymann (16 September 1708 – 12 December 1791) was a Norwegian educator and pietist leader.

Catharina Maria Freymann was born in Christiania (now Oslo, Norway). She was the daughter of Wenzel Freymann and Karen Bartholomeusdatter. Her father was a blacksmith who had immigrated from Bohemia. Her parents placed great emphasis on the children's upbringing and Christian education. When her father died, she moved to the home of Lieutenant Colonel Jørgen Meding at Toten in Oppland, where she was influenced by the pietistic movement within Lutheranism.

In 1733, she started a girls school in his parents' house which she had inherited. In 1737, she was visited by the Danish theologian Gert Hansen, who had been influenced by the teachings of John Hus and the Hussites revival. When Gert Hansen was arrested for not having submitted his passport to the police after his arrival, she arranged a demonstration at the town hall. She subsequently became the local leader of the Moravian movement (Brødremenigheten) in Norway. She traveled between the different Moravian congregations scattered within Norway. Church of Norway authorities were soon aware of what was happening. Her religious activities are commonly considered to have contributed to restrictions on freedom of religion in both Norway and Denmark. King Christian VI of Denmark and Norway issued a Royal Decree (the Conventicle Act) on January 13, 1741, which forbade future religious gatherings without the consent of Church parish priests. The ordinance remained in effect in Norway until abolished in 1842.

She spent her later years as an employee at the Moravian colony in the village of Herrnhut in eastern Saxony where she died in 1791 at 82 years of age.

== See also ==
- Pietism
- History of the Moravian Church
