= Johann Adolf Scheibe =

German-Danish composer

Johann Scheibe
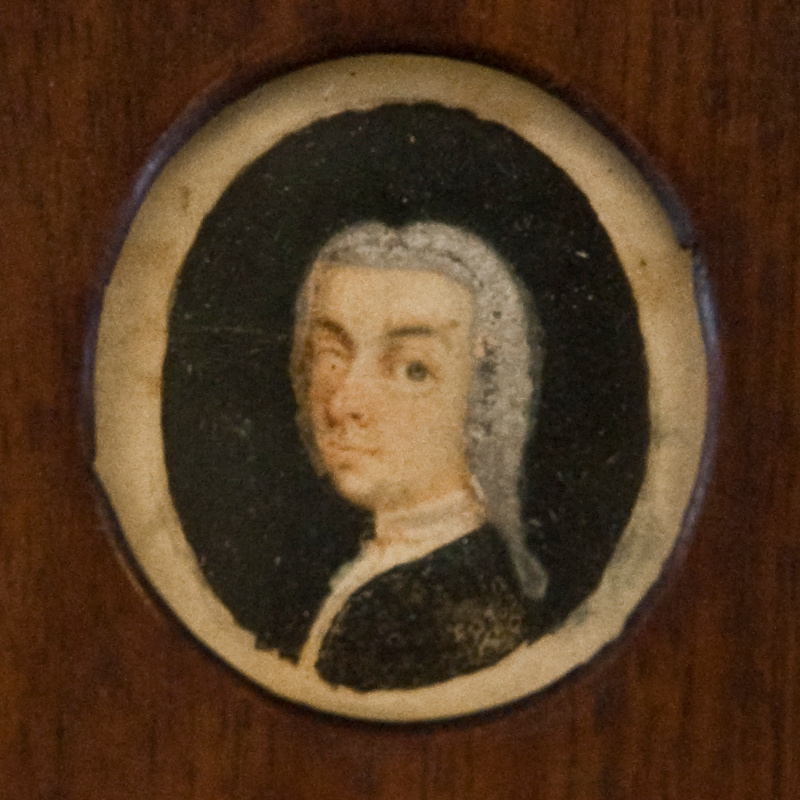
- Johann Adolph Scheibe.
- Born: 5 May 1708; Leipzig
- Died: 22 April 1776 (aged 67); Copenhagen
- Occupation: Composer

Johann Adolph Scheibe (5 May 1708 – 22 April 1776) was a German-Danish composer and significant critic and theorist of music. Though much of his theoretical work survives, most of his compositions are lost, though the extant ones demonstrate a style between the Baroque and Classical periods.

== Life ==
Johann Adolf Scheibe was born in Leipzig as the son of Johann Scheibe (c. 1675 – 1748), an organ builder, and started keyboard lessons at the age of six. In 1725, he began studying law and philosophy at Leipzig University, and in the course of his studies he encountered the professor of rhetoric and poetry Johann Christoph Gottsched, whose aesthetic theories deeply influenced Scheibe. Gottsched's writings, which were primarily targeted toward the reform of German poetry and drama, greatly informed Scheibe's formulation of his philosophy of music.

Due to financial difficulties, Scheibe was unable to finish his university studies, and devoted himself instead to a largely self-taught career in music. In 1729 he applied unsuccessfully for the post of organist at St. Thomas Church, Leipzig, where Johann Sebastian Bach was the cantor. Scheibe was active in the musical scene of Leipzig until 1735.

In 1736, he moved to Hamburg where he made influential friends including Johann Mattheson and Georg Philipp Telemann. Encouraged by both, Scheibe published the magazine "Der Critische Musikus" between 1737 and 1740. The magazine received widespread attention and remains significant today for its discussion of significant contemporary composers.

In 1739, Margrave Friedrich Ernst of Brandenburg-Culmbach named Scheibe his kapellmeister. The next year, upon the invitation of the Margrave's sister, the Danish queen Sophie Magdalene, he became kapellmeister at the court of King Christian VI of Denmark. Scheibe rapidly became the most significant musical figure in Copenhagen. He led the royal orchestra, composed vocal and instrumental music, and was a driving force in the foundation of the first musical society, "Det Musikalske Societet", which held public concerts between 1744 and 1749.

After the king's death in 1746, his successor Frederick V effected a move away from the pietism of the previous monarchs. Theatre and opera were once again allowed, and the Royal Danish Theatre opened in 1749. Musical taste turned to Italian opera and French comic opera. Scheibe was strongly opposed to this new style, and his employment was terminated in 1748. His replacement was Paolo Scalabrini.

Scheibe moved to Sønderborg where he opened a music school for children while continuing to write, compose, and translate Danish texts into German. During this time, he maintained contact with musical life in Copenhagen, often visiting to lead performances of works composed for royal occasions and concerts. The funeral cantatas for King Friedrich V and Queen Luisa are among his finest works. He published a collection of "New Freemasons' Songs with Easy Melodies" in 1749, having been a member of the Lodge of Zorobabel since 1746.

In 1762, Scheibe returned to Copenhagen, where he remained until his death 14 years later. Though most of his music is now lost, he composed over 150 church pieces and oratorios, some 200 concertos, two operas, and numerous sinfonias, chamber pieces, and secular cantatas.

== Literary work ==
Scheibe translated and wrote a biography of Baron Ludvig Holberg, whose works on natural and common law remained significant for 200 years.

He published a collected edition of the "Critische Musikus" in 1745. His other large works are the "Treatise on the Age and Origin of Music" (1754) and "On Musical Composition" (1773).

== Commentary on his contemporaries ==
Scheibe held Johann Sebastian Bach and Georg Frideric Handel as the finest composers of keyboard music, citing structure and ornamentation as of primary importance. He considered Bach to be the finest contemporary player of the organ, harpsichord and clavichord, incomparable to all except Handel. Bach's Italian Concerto (BWV 971), published in 1735, was for Scheibe a perfect example of a well-constructed concerto.

Scheibe's often-quoted objections to the music of Bach derive from an anonymous letter from 1737 in the Critischer Musikus. Scheibe blamed Bach's music for being "bombastic". Johann Abraham Birnbaum, a professor in rhetoric at Leipzig, defended Bach on that occasion. The quarrel between Scheibe and Birnbaum was a very long and significant one. According to Scheibe Bach's music was artificial and confusing in style, and the notation of such elaborate ornaments (rather than leaving ornamentation to the performer, as was customary) obscured the melody and harmony. Rather than a clear division between melody and accompaniment, Bach made all voices equal in his brand of polyphony, which Scheibe felt made the music overloaded, unnatural and oppressed.

In Albert Schweitzer's famous book on Bach, Schweitzer describes Scheibe as the literary champion of a distinctively German style of music, one that would break away from the Italian models. The Italian influence was toward artifice and complexity. The German impulse was toward naturalness and simplicity, to Scheibe's way of thinking.

This theory made it "impossible for him to do justice to Bach," Schweitzer wrote. Bach was much too complicated, and thus too Italian, for his taste. Although of course acknowledging Bach's talents, he did conclude that Bach, tragically, had fallen "from the natural to the artificial, and from the lofty to the obscure ... one wonders at the painful labor of it all, that nevertheless comes to nothing, since it is at variance with reason."

This led to an exchange between Scheibe and Johann Abraham Birnbaum (1702–1748), an admirer of Bach and professor of rhetoric at the University of Leipzig. The exchange did Bach's reputation some good, because Scheibe's prickly tone "everywhere stimulated sympathy for Bach."

Scheibe believed that musical talent was inborn, and that the musician could express emotions only by subjecting himself to their influence by the force of his imagination. In numerous published treatises and essays, Scheibe explored the nature of taste, melody, expression, and musical invention, and defended a nationalist conception of musical style. His theories, which were advanced for his time, were based on rational principles, purity of expression, the imitation of nature, and the application of the rhetorical arts to the processes of musical creation.

== Musical works ==
Scheibe composed concertos, sinfonias, sonatas, suites, partitas and incidental music. His vocal music includes operas, cantatas, oratorios, chorales, mass sections, songs and odes.

== See also ==
- List of Danish composers
