= Antoine de Laurès =

French poet and playwright (1708–1779)

- Born: 30 November 1708; Gignac, Hérault, France
- Died: 12 January 1779 (aged 70); Paris, France
- Occupations: Poet and playwright

Antoine de Laurès (30 November 1708, in Gignac, Hérault – 12 January 1779, in Paris) was an 18th-century French poet and playwright from Languedoc.

He was a writer, translator into French of Pharsalia by Lucan (Marcus Annaeus Lucanus), and author of La fête de Cythère, a one-act opera created on 19 November 1753 at the Château de Berny. He lived in the Château de Gignac. He authored poems, theatre plays, operas and tragedies; he left a correspondence with Voltaire.

== Works ==
- 1749: Épître à Madame la Marquise de Pompadour
- 1751: Épître au Roy sur l'établissement de l'École royale militaire
- 1769: Thomire, tragedy.
- 1771: La Fausse Statue, comedy
- 1775: Ode sur le rétablissement du Parlement which won the extraordinary prize proposed by the Académie des Jeux Floraux in Toulouse.

== Bibliography ==
- Nécrologie des hommes célèbres. 1780. (p. 198–250). Firmin-Didot. Nouvelle biographie générale. t. XXIX. Paris 1859.
- F. Baumes. Le chevalier Antoine de Laurès (1708–1779). La quinzaine. 16 July 1906.
- Régis de Saint-Jouan and Jacques Reilhan de Carnas. Généalogie de la famille de Laurès. in Claude-Daniel de Laurès. Mémoire pour servir l’histoire de la ville de Gignac et de ses environs. Arts et traditions rurales. 2004.
