= Gignac Bridge =

18th century bridge in Hérault, France

Coordinates: 43°39′13″N 3°32′8″E

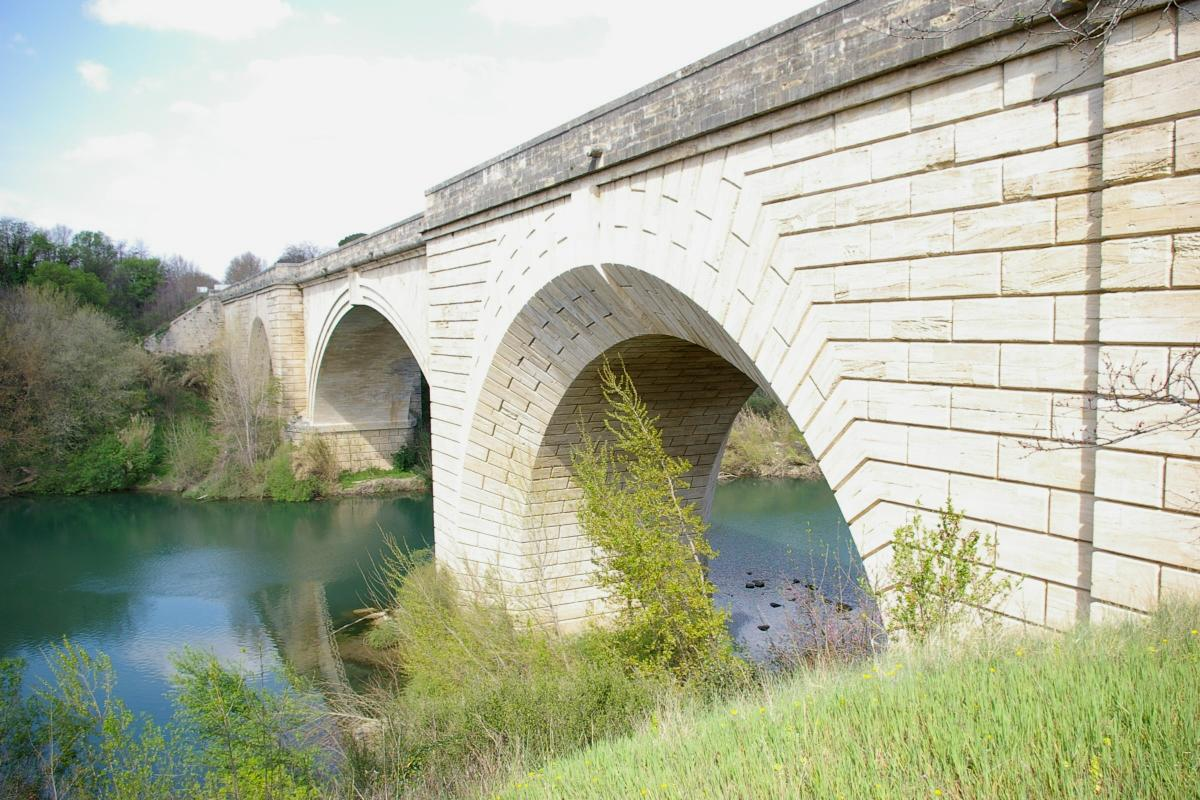
Pont de Gignac

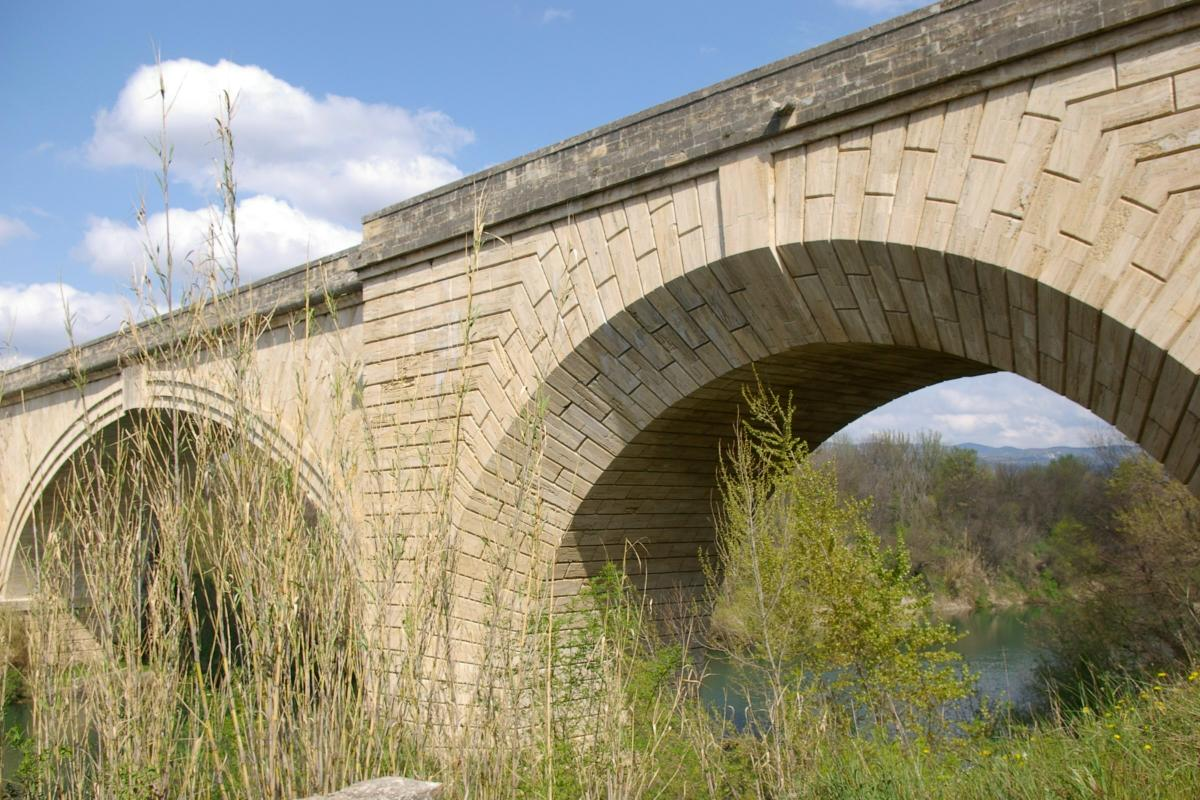
Pont de Gignac

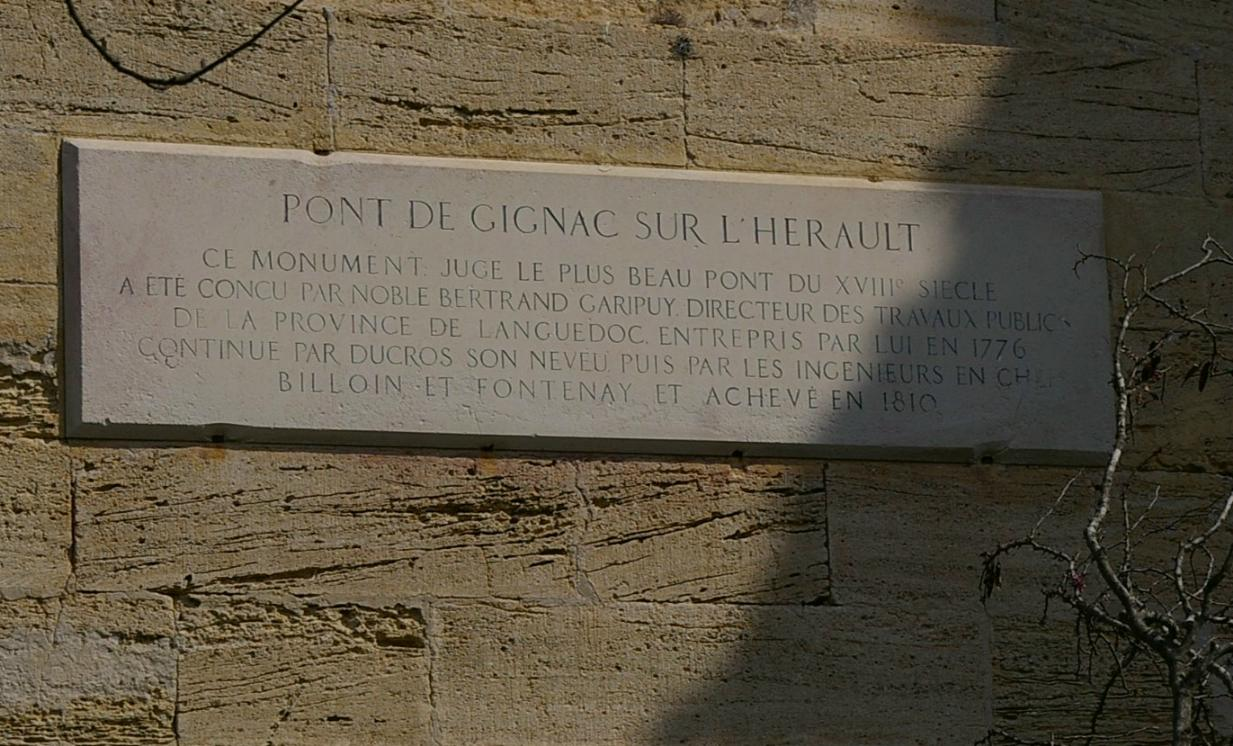
Plaque on bridge

Gignac Bridge (French: Pont de Gignac) carries the N109 road over the river Hérault, 1 km west of the town of Gignac in the Hérault département of France. It is described by a plaque on the side as "Judged the most beautiful bridge of the 18th century", a view shared by the Michelin Green Guide which describes it as "considered to be the finest 18C bridge in France because of its daring design and the beauty of its architectural lines."

Gignac Bridge has been protected since 1950 as a monument historique by the French Ministry of Culture.

The bridge has three arches and is constructed from dressed limestone. Its dimensions are: length 174.76 m; height 20.64 m; width 9.80 m (respectively, approximately 573, 68 and 32 feet.) The side arches span 25.97 m each and the central arch spans 50.72 m.

Construction began in 1776 to plans drawn up by the engineer Bertrand Garipuy, then Director of Public Works in the Languedoc province. He was succeeded by his nephew, Ducros, in 1782. The foundations and the side arches were in place by 1784. Delayed by the French Revolution, the bridge was finally completed by chief engineers Billoin and Fontenay in 1810.

The building of the A750 motorway, and the opening on 11 June 2008 of the Languedoc Bridge, a few hundred metres downstream, has removed much of the traffic which previously used the Gignac Bridge.

== See also ==
- List of bridges in France
