= Siege of Yelabuga (1708) =

Part of Bashkir rebellion of 1704–1711

Siege of Elabuga
- Part of Bashkir rebellion of 1704–1711
Date	January 7, 1708
Location	Yelabuga
Result	Bashkir victory

Belligerents
Bashkirs	Tsardom of Russia

Commanders and leaders
Kusyum Tyulekeev	Unknown

Units involved
2,000	Unknown

Siege of Yelabuga – the siege of the city by bashkir rebels under the command of Kusyum Tyulekeyev.

== Background ==
In the first half of January 1708, the main forces of the rebels crossed the Kama River, and the territory becomes the main theater of war Kazan County west of Kama.

== The course of hostilities ==
After the siege of the Zain fortress, 3,000 rebels under the command of Kusyum Tyulekeyev besieged Yelabuga.

== See also ==
- Battle of Yuraktau (1707)
