= Gignac, Hérault =

Gignac
- Commune
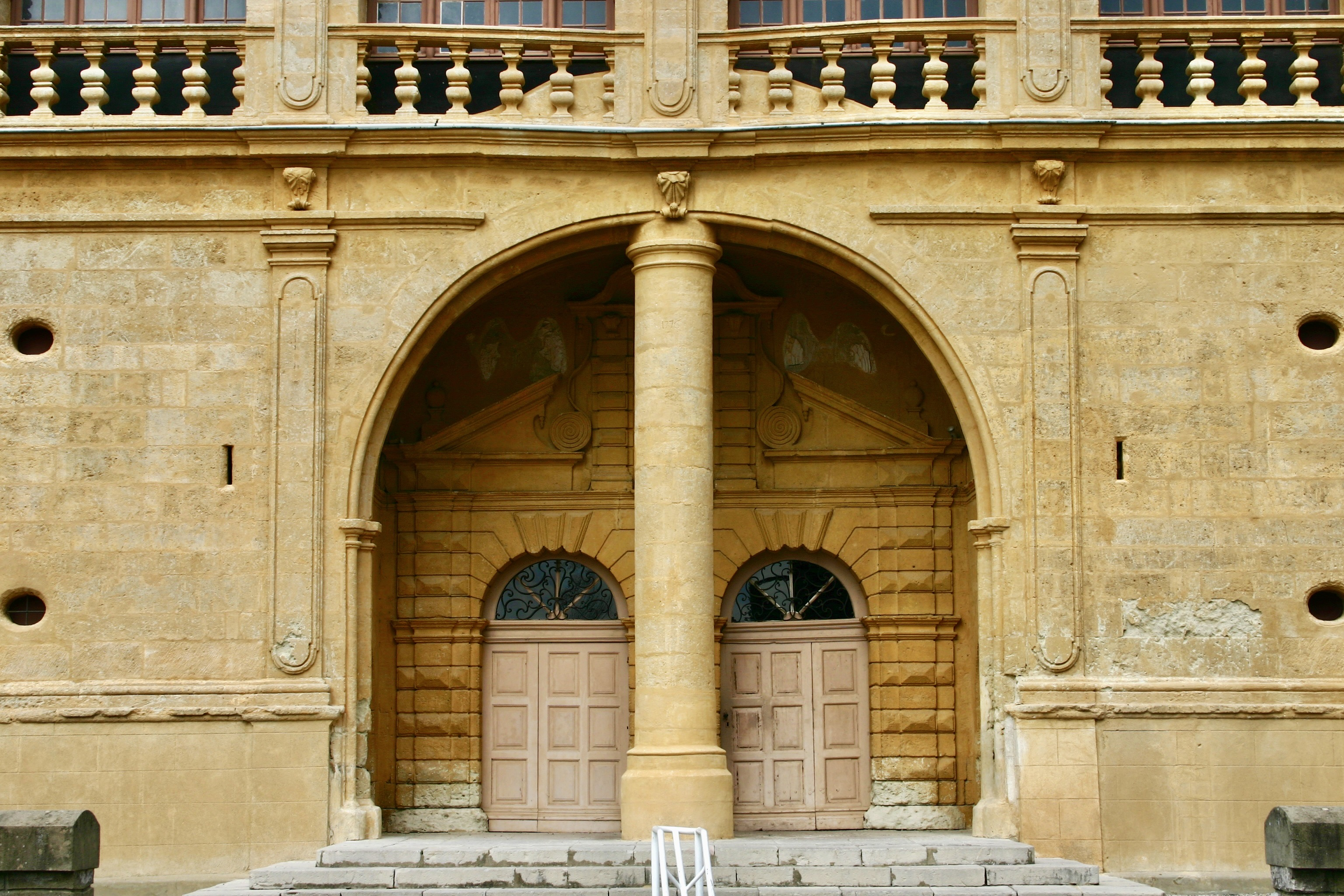
- Notre Dame de Grâce

- Coat of arms
- Location of Gignac
- Location within France Location within Occitanie
- Coordinates: 43°39′N 3°33′E
- Country: France
- Region: Occitania
- Department: Hérault
- Arrondissement: Lodève
- Canton: Gignac
- Intercommunality: Vallée de l'Hérault

Government
  - Mayor (2020–2026): Jean-François Soto
- Area^{1}: 29.85 km^{2} (11.53 sq mi)
- Highest elevation: 286 m (938 ft)
- Lowest elevation: 28 m (92 ft)
- Population (2023): 6,651
  - Density: 222.8/km^{2} (577.1/sq mi)
- Time zone: UTC+01:00 (CET)
  - Summer (DST): UTC+02:00 (CEST)
- INSEE/Postal code: 34114 /34150
- ^{1} French Land Register data, which excludes lakes, ponds, glaciers > 1 km^{2} (0.386 sq mi or 247 acres) and river estuaries.

Gignac (French pronunciation: [ʒiɲak]; Occitan: Ginhac) is a commune in the Hérault département in the Occitanie region in southern France.

== Population ==
Its inhabitants are called Gignacois in French.

Historical population
Year	Pop.	±% p.a.
1968	2,746	—
1975	2,848	+0.52%
1982	3,228	+1.81%
1990	3,652	+1.55%
1999	3,955	+0.89%
2007	5,059	+3.13%
2012	5,654	+2.25%
2017	6,200	+1.86%
2023	6,651	+1.18%
Source: INSEE

== Sights ==
- Gignac Bridge over the river Hérault, completed 1810.
- Church of Notre-Dame-de-Grâce
- "Tour sarrasine" tower

== Personalities ==
- Antoine de Laurès (1708–1779), writer, friend of Voltaire, translator into French of Pharsalia by Lucan (Marcus Annaeus Lucanus), and author of La fête de Cythère, a one-act opera created on 19 November 1753 at the Château de Berny. He lived in the Château de Gignac.

== Map ==
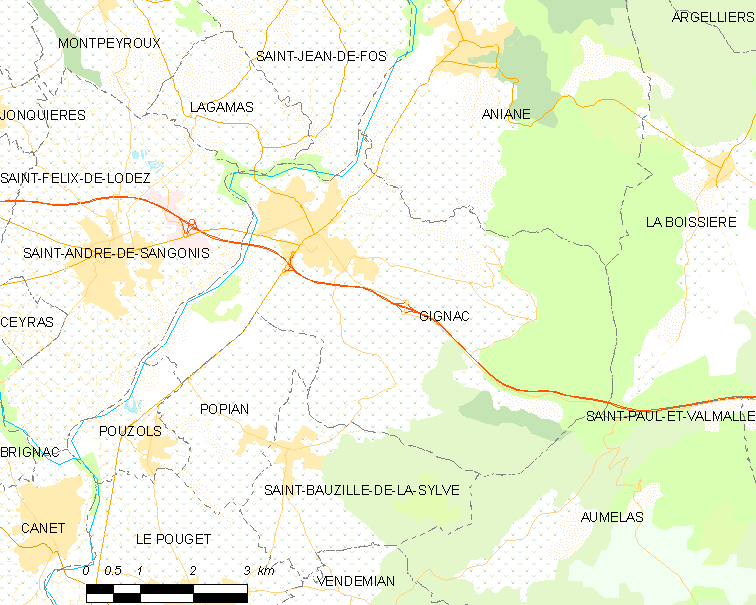
Map

== See also ==
- Communes of the Hérault department
