= Hill Boothby =

- Born: 27 October 1708; Ashbourne
- Died: 16 January 1756 (aged 47)
- Known for: friend of Samuel Johnson
- Partner: Samuel Johnson

Hill Boothby (27 October 1708 – 16 January 1756) was an English friend and late love of Samuel Johnson.

== Life ==
Boothby was born in Ashbourne in 1708. She was the granddaughter of Sir William Boothby, third baronet, and daughter of Mr. Brook Boothby, of Ashbourne Hall. Her mother was Elizabeth Fitzherbert, a daughter of John Fitzherbert of Somersal Herbert. Anna Seward called her the sublimated methodistic Hill Boothby who read her bible in Hebrew. Boothby made the acquaintance of Dr. Samuel Johnson whilst he was staying with Dr. John Taylor when they were younger, although at the time he was interested in another in 1739-40.

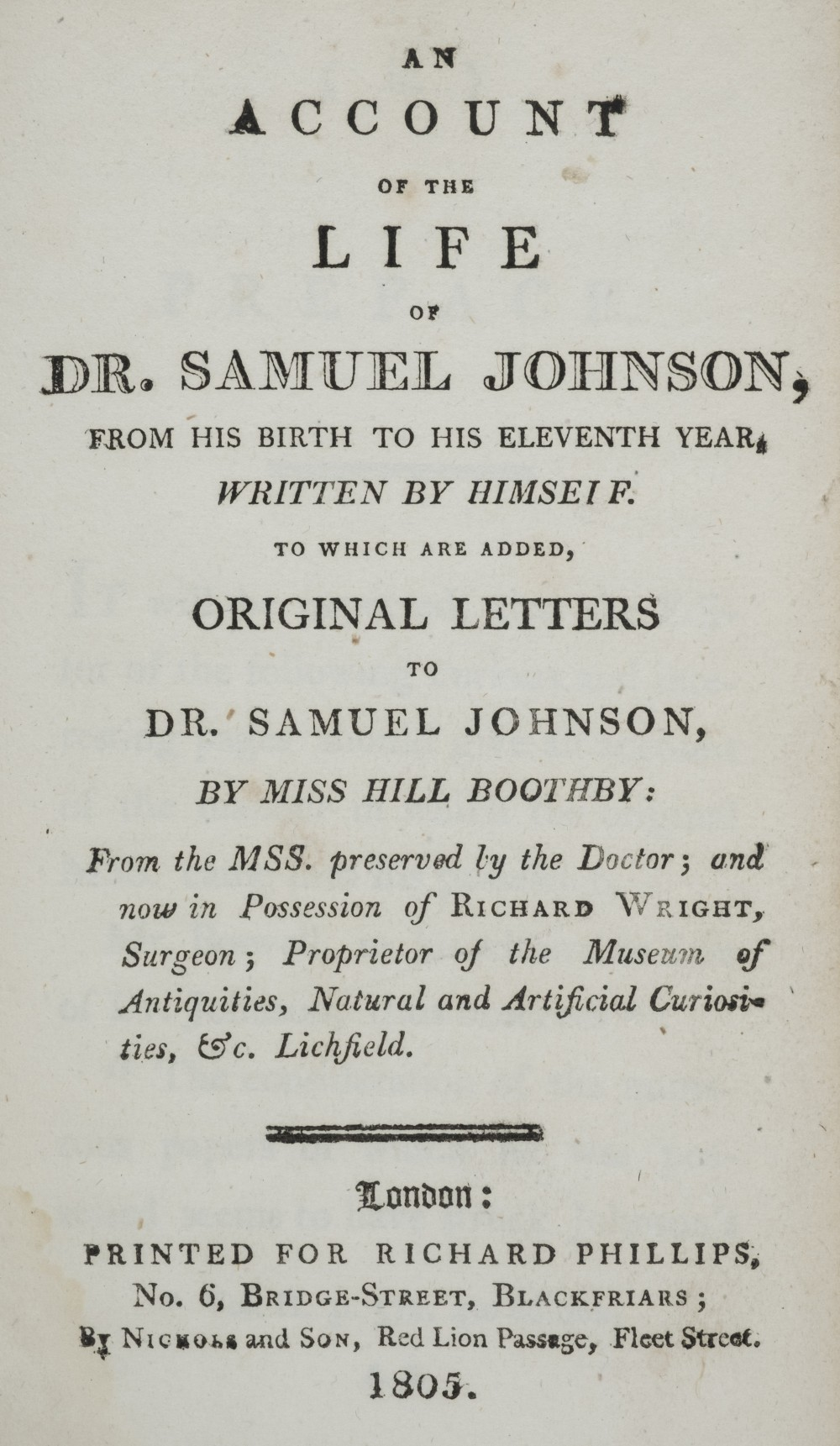
1805 biography including Boothby's letters

Johnson addresses her as sweet angel and dearest dear, and assures her that he ‘has none other on whom his heart reposes.’ Johnson wrote that he would look for a new wife and Hill Boothby was his intended.

In his letters, he tells her of his remedy which he had refused to tell Boswell. He believed that wine and dried orange peel was of benefit for the bowels.

Boothby died on 16 January 1756 and Johnson was grief-stricken. He had written echoing Descartes that “I am alive therefore I love Miss Boothby”. Her letters were collected and later published.
