= Jardin botanique de la Font de Bézombes =

Botanical garden in Languedoc-Roussillon, France

Coordinates: 43°39′02″N 3°30′15″E

The Jardin botanique de la Font de Bézombes (2 hectares) is a private botanical garden located in Saint-André-de-Sangonis, Hérault, Languedoc-Roussillon, France. The garden contains three environments organized into seven sections: tropical, desert, swamp, Chinese, herbs, vegetables, and French garden. It is open on the first weekend of the warmer months; an admission fee is charged.

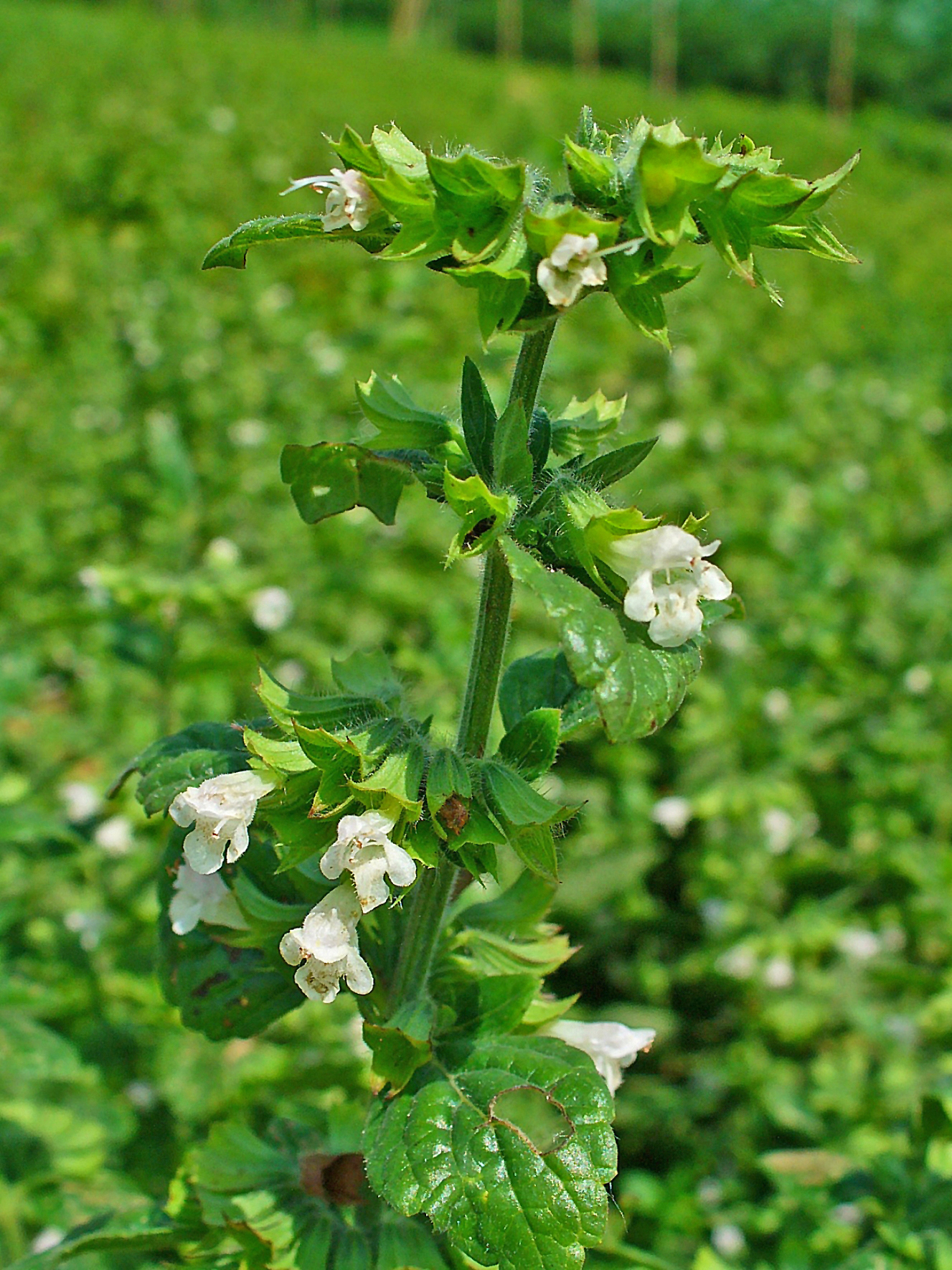

== See also ==
- List of botanical gardens in France
