= Lieuran =

Lieuran may refer to two communes in the Hérault department in southern France:

- Lieuran-Cabrières
- Lieuran-lès-Béziers
