= Tittia gens =

Ancient Roman family

The gens Tittia was an obscure plebeian family at ancient Rome. Few members of this gens appear in history, but Marcus Tittius Frugi attained the consulship in AD 80. A number of other Tittii are known from inscriptions.

== Origin ==
Several of the earlier Tittii came from Casilinum in Campania, while others came from Atina in Latium, near the Campanian border.

== Praenomina ==
The Tittii known from epigraphy used a number of common praenomina, chiefly Lucius, Gaius, Marcus, and Quintus. Besides these, a few Tittii bore other common names, including Gnaeus and Titus.

== Members ==
This list includes abbreviated praenomina. For an explanation of this practice, see filiation.

- Gaius Tittius C. f., one of the officials in charge of building walls for the temples of Jupiter Optimus Maximus and the Dioscuri at Casilinum in Campania in 108 and 106 BC.
- Gaius Tittius C. l. Philargyrus, a freedman named in an inscription from Casilinum, dating from the latter half of the first century BC.
- Quintus Tittius Q. f., the husband of Tittia, and father of Tittius Pontanus, Lucius, Gnaeus, and Quintus Tittius, and Tittia. His son Tittius Pontanus built a family sepulchre for them all at Atina in Latium, dating from the first half of the first century.
- Tittia M. f., the wife of Quintus Tittius, and mother of Tittius Pontanus, Lucius, Gnaeus, and Quintus Tittius, and Tittia. Her son Tittius Pontanus built a family sepulchre for them all at Atina, dating from the first half of the first century.
- Tittius Q. f. Q. n. Pontanus, built a family sepulchre at Atina, dating from the first half of the first century, for himself, his wife, Tittia, his parents, Quintus Tittius and Tittia, brothers, Lucius, Gnaeus, and Quintus Tittius, and sister Tittia.
- Tittia Sp. f., the wife of Tittius Pontanus, who built a family sepulchre at Atina, dating from the first half of the first century, for himself, his wife, his parents, brothers, and sister.
- Lucius Tittius Q. f. Q. n., the son of Quintus Tittius and Tittia, and brother of Tittius Pontanus, who built a family sepulchre at Atina, dating from the first half of the first century, for himself, his wife, his parents, brothers, and sister.
- Gnaeus Tittius Q. f. Q. n., the son of Quintus Tittius and Tittia, and brother of Tittius Pontanus, who built a family sepulchre at Atina, dating from the first half of the first century, for himself, his wife, his parents, brothers, and sister.
- Quintus Tittius Q. f. Q. n., the son of Quintus Tittius and Tittia, and brother of Tittius Pontanus, who built a family sepulchre at Atina, dating from the first half of the first century, for himself, his wife, his parents, brothers, and sister.
- Tittia Q. f. Q. n., the daughter of Quintus Tittius and Tittia, and sister of Tittius Pontanus, who built a family sepulchre at Atina, dating from the first half of the first century, for himself, his wife, his parents, brothers, and sister.
- Tittia L. l. Daphne, a freedwoman named in a first-century inscription from Casilinum.
- Marcus Tittius M. f. Gratus, buried in a first-century tomb at Gratianopolis in Gallia Narbonensis.
- Gaius Tittius Titulus, the son of Vatio, buried at Gratianopolis, in a tomb dating from the latter half of the first century.
- Marcus Tittius Frugi, consul suffectus for the last two months of AD 80, during the reign of Titus.
- Tittius, a middle or late second-century potter whose maker's mark has been found at Aquincum in Pannonia Inferior and Brigetio in Pannonia Superior.
- Titus Tittius T. f. Placidus Tuder, a speculator, or scout, named in an inscription from Rome dating from AD 180.
- Tittius Felix, a member of the boot-makers' guild at Ostia in Latium in AD 198.
- Marcus Tittius Castrensis, a soldier in the fifth cohort of the Vigiles at Rome in AD 210. He served in the century of Aeilius Torquatus.
- Tittia Festa, a little girl buried at Puteoli in Campania, aged five years, three months, and one day, in a third-century tomb built by her mother, Pompeia Felicitas.

=== Undated Tittii ===
- Tittius, a potter whose maker's mark has been found at Axima in Alpes Graiae; Augustonemetum in Aquitania; Duroliponte, Londinium, and Eboracum in Britannia; and Argentorate in Germania Superior.
- Tittia Amobbalis, buried at Lamiggiga in Numidia, aged eighty, with a tomb built by her heirs and legatees.
- Tittius Asper, a physician at Rome.
- Gaius Tittius Carmacus, a plumbarius, or plumber, who made an offering to Jupiter Optimus Maximus at Heliopolis in Syria, and donated statues of Sol, Luna, and Victoria.
- Lucius Tittius Caupo, a potter whose maker's mark has been found at Baeterrae in Gallia Narbonensis.
- Tittia Nice, dedicated a tomb at Rome for her daughter.
- Tittius Oppius, a potter whose maker's mark has been found at Augusta Emerita in Lusitania.
- Marcus Tittius Re[...], made an offering to one or more of the gods at Berytus in Syria.
- Tittius Q. f. Rufus, a priest of Fortuna at Interamna Lirenas.
- Tittius Cettinus Cocillus, an apparitor, or deputy to Sextus Julius Lucanus, one of the duumvirs of the city of Segusiavorum in Gallia Lugdunensis.
- Lucius Tittius Thyrsus, a potter whose maker's mark has been found at Tarraco in Hispania Citerior.
- Marcus Tittius C. f. Ursanus, named in an inscription from Atina, along with Julia Tima, a freedwoman of the emperor.

== See also ==
- List of Roman gentes

== Bibliography ==
- Theodor Mommsen et alii, Corpus Inscriptionum Latinarum (The Body of Latin Inscriptions, abbreviated CIL), Berlin-Brandenburgische Akademie der Wissenschaften (1853–present).
- René Cagnat et alii, L'Année épigraphique (The Year in Epigraphy, abbreviated AE), Presses Universitaires de France (1888–present).
- Nuovo Bollettino di Archeologia Cristiana (1913–present).
- La Carte Archéologique de la Gaule (Archaeological Map of Gaul, abbreviated CAG), Académie des Inscriptions et Belles-Lettres (1931–present).
- Hispania Epigraphica (Epigraphy of Spain), Madrid (1989–present).
- Péter Kovács and Ádám Szábó, Tituli Aquincenses, Budapest (2009–present).
