= Cabrières, Hérault =

Cabrières
- Commune
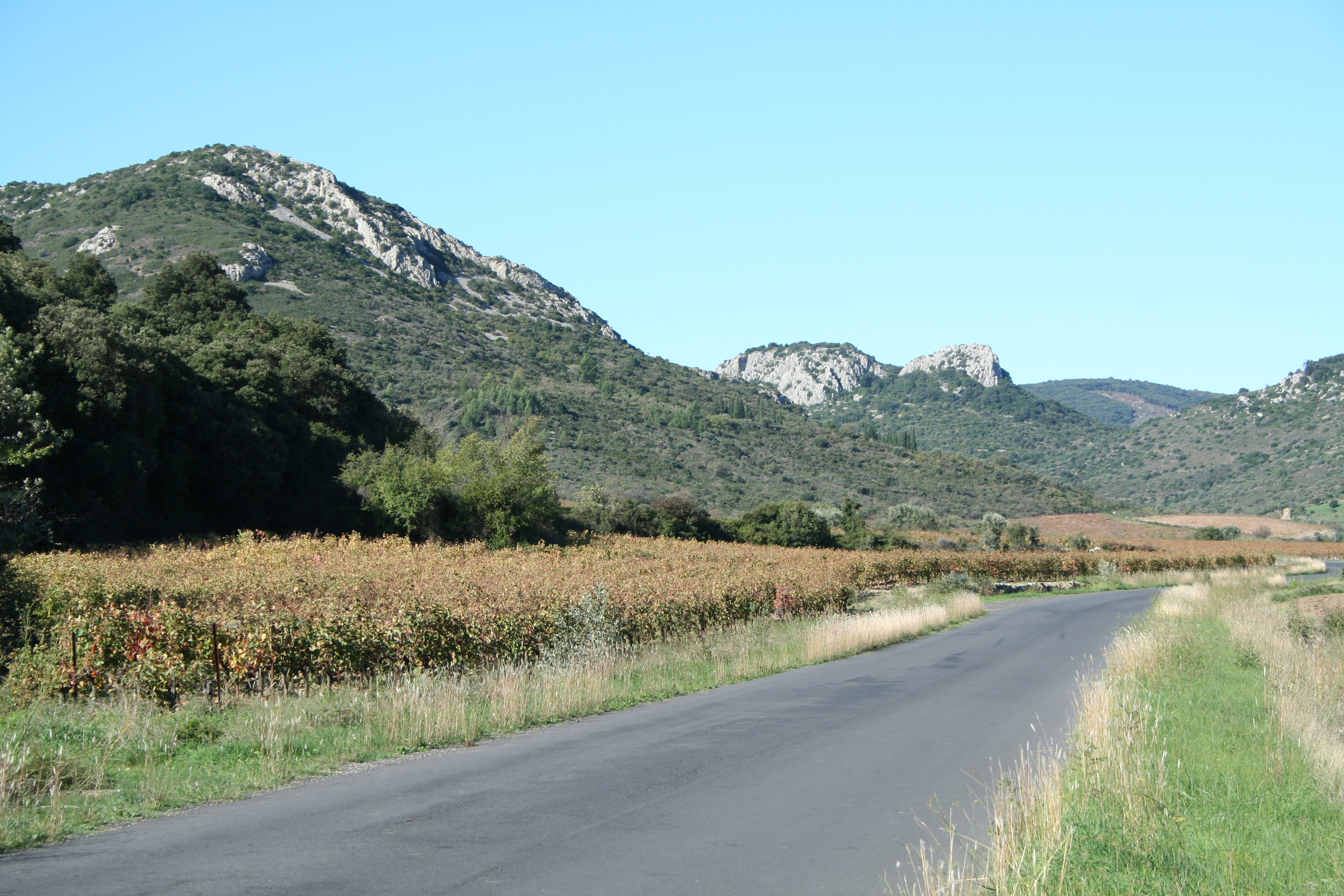
- Site of the chateau of Cabrières

- Coat of arms
- Location of Cabrières
- Location within France Location within Occitanie
- Coordinates: 43°34′41″N 3°21′48″E
- Country: France
- Region: Occitania
- Department: Hérault
- Arrondissement: Lodève
- Canton: Mèze
- Intercommunality: Clermontais

Government
  - Mayor (2020–2026): Myriam Gairaud
- Area^{1}: 29.02 km^{2} (11.20 sq mi)
- Elevation: 135 m (443 ft)
- Highest elevation: 481 m (1,578 ft)
- Lowest elevation: 76 m (249 ft)
- Population (2023): 560
  - Density: 19/km^{2} (50/sq mi)
- Time zone: UTC+01:00 (CET)
  - Summer (DST): UTC+02:00 (CEST)
- INSEE/Postal code: 34045 /34800
- ^{1} French Land Register data, which excludes lakes, ponds, glaciers > 1 km^{2} (0.386 sq mi or 247 acres) and river estuaries.

Cabrières (French pronunciation: [kabʁijɛʁ]; Languedocien: Cabrièiras) is a commune in the Hérault department in southern France. It is noted for its flourishing wine industry.

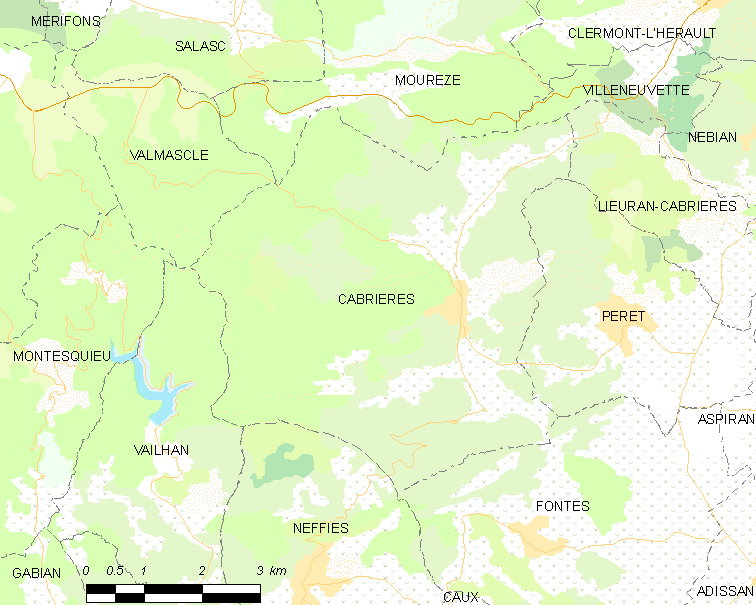
Map

== Viticulture ==
Cabrières wine is marketed under the AOC Coteaux du Languedoc. This is the smallest of the Languedoc Roussillon appellations.

Grape varieties permitted are:

- White : Bourboulenc, Roussanne, Marsanne, Clairette, Terret
- Rosé : Grenache (10% maximum when blended) or Cinsaut (45% minimum for rosés; 40% maximum for reds)
- Red : Carignan, Grenache, Mourvèdre and Syrah.

The Grenache, Mourvèdre and Syrah varieties combined must add up to a minimum of 50%.

The majority of wine production takes place in the Cave Coopérative des Vignerons de l'Estabel, which has been bottling wine since 1948. Other production wineries are Le Domaine du Temple, le Château des Deux Rocs, le Clos Romain, le Mas de Valbrune and le Mas Cauvi. All told, Cabrières wine production is restricted to 20,000 hectolitres.

== Geology ==
The GSSP for the Tournaisian is near the summit of La Serre hill, in the commune of Cabrières, in the Montagne Noire (southern France). The GSSP is in a section on the southern side of the hill, in an 80 cm deep trench, about 125 m south of the summit, 2.5 km southwest of the village of Cabrières and 2.5 km north of the hamlet of Fontès.

== Population ==
Historical population
Year	Pop.	±% p.a.
1968	415	—
1975	364	−1.86%
1982	330	−1.39%
1990	307	−0.90%
1999	338	+1.07%
2007	445	+3.50%
2012	482	+1.61%
2017	475	−0.29%
2023	560	+2.78%
Source: INSEE

== See also ==
- Communes of the Hérault department
