= Raymond Recouly =

French journalist (1876–1950)

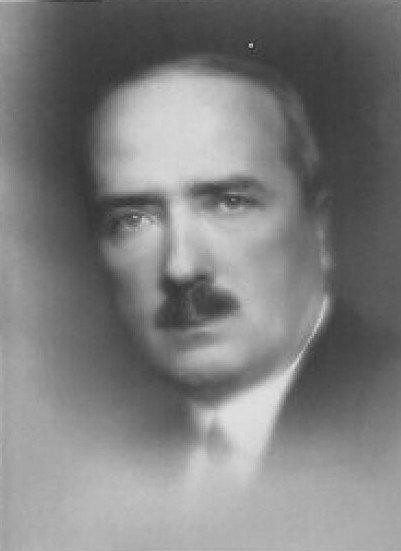
- Raymond Recouly
- Born: 14 June 1876; Saint-Pons-de-Mauchiens, France
- Died: 12 September 1950; Montpellier, France
- Occupation: Journalist

Raymond Louis Émile Recouly (14 June 1876 – 12 September 1950) was a French journalist, author and war correspondent.

== Biography ==
Recouly was born in the Hérault department of southern France in the Languedoc region, on the 14th of June 1876. He studied at the Faculty of Letters of the Sorbonne in Paris. In 1901-02 he presided at the Association Générale d’Étudiants. In 1904-05 he was a war correspondent for the Parisian daily Le Temps in Manchuria for the Russo-Japanese War.

== Career ==
Following the Russo-Japanese conflict he worked reporting from London as correspondent for Le Figaro, Morocco, the Balkans and Asia-Minor. He worked occasionally using the non de plume of Capitaine X for L’Illustration, Grignoire, as well as for Le Temps and Le Figaro. According to the editor of Grignoire, Horace De Carbuccia, he was a good reporter of diligent devotion who travelled from the British Raj to Siberia in order to report for Le Temps on the Russo-Japanese War on the advice of the viceroy of India Lord Curzon. He was able to become rapidly credited and gave his impression to Georges Clemenceau on the defeat of Tsarist Russia by Imperial Japan, despite the disapproval of foreign minister Théophile Delcasé. Jules Cambon also noted that “If there had been more Recouly in the past, perhaps history would be less of a conjectural science.” in praise.

During the First World War he was sent on various Maison de la Presse missions in Russia and in neutral Spain, and was appointed as an aide to the French General Staff. In May 1916 he directed the Madrid Telegraphic Information Agency. After the war he went to Gringnoire in 1928. He became president of the Association of French Journalists and former War Correspondents, and was biographer for Ferdinand Foch and Joseph Joffre when they died in 1929 and 1931. After the Liberation of Paris, he was arrested on the 14th September 1944 as Gringnoire had been involved in collaboration activity. He died in Montpellier on 12 September 1950.

== Works published ==
- Le Pays magyar, Paris : F. Alcan , 1903
- Dix mois de guerre en Mandchourie, Félix Juven, 1905
- La bataille de Foch, librairie hachette, 1920
- Itinéraires algériens, 1922,
- Les heures tragiques d'avant-guerre, la renaissance du livre, 1922
- Le printemps rouge : épisode de guerre et de révolution en Russie, les éditions de France, 1924
- Le mémorial de Foch : mes entretiens avec le maréchal , les éditions de France, 1929
- Bonaparte à Toulon, les éditions de France, 1929
- Le quatre septembre, librairie hachette, 1930
- Louis-Philippe, roi des Français : le chemin vers le trône, Les éditions de France, 1930
- Joffre, éditions des portiques, 1931,
- Pistes, fleuves et jungles, à travers l'Indochine et les pays voisins, les éditions de France, 1932
- Les négociations secrètes Briand-Lancken : les dessous de l'histoire, les éditions de France, 1933
- L'Amérique pauvre, les éditions de France, 1933
- Histoire de la grande guerre, 1914-1918, les éditions de France, 1934
- François-Joseph : le crépuscule d'un empire, les éditions de France, 1936
- Le chasseur de nuées ou La vie de Cervantès, les éditions de France, 1938
- Chez les moujiks en capote grise : souvenirs de guerre et de révolution en Russie, les éditions de France, 1942
