= Cazouls =

Cazouls may refer to two communes in the Hérault department in southern France:

- Cazouls-d'Hérault
- Cazouls-lès-Béziers
