= Adissan =

- Commune
- Coat of arms
- Location of Adissan
- Location within France Location within Occitanie
- Coordinates: 43°32′10″N 3°25′45″E
- Country: France
- Region: Occitania
- Department: Hérault
- Arrondissement: Béziers
- Canton: Mèze
- Intercommunality: CA Hérault Méditerranée

Government
  - Mayor (2020–2026): Patrick Lario
- Area^{1}: 4.46 km^{2} (1.72 sq mi)
- Elevation: 76 m (249 ft)
- Highest elevation: 105 m (344 ft)
- Lowest elevation: 30 m (98 ft)
- Population (2023): 1,371
  - Density: 307/km^{2} (796/sq mi)
- Time zone: UTC+01:00 (CET)
  - Summer (DST): UTC+02:00 (CEST)
- INSEE/Postal code: 34002 /34230
- ^{1} French Land Register data, which excludes lakes, ponds, glaciers > 1 km^{2} (0.386 sq mi or 247 acres) and river estuaries.

Adissan (French pronunciation: [adisɑ̃]; Occitan: Adiçan) is a commune in the Hérault department in the Occitanie region in southern France.

== Population ==
Historical population
Year	Pop.	±% p.a.
1968	733	—
1975	700	−0.66%
1982	720	+0.40%
1990	706	−0.25%
1999	736	+0.46%
2007	893	+2.45%
2012	1,033	+2.96%
2017	1,212	+3.25%
2023	1,371	+2.08%
Source: INSEE

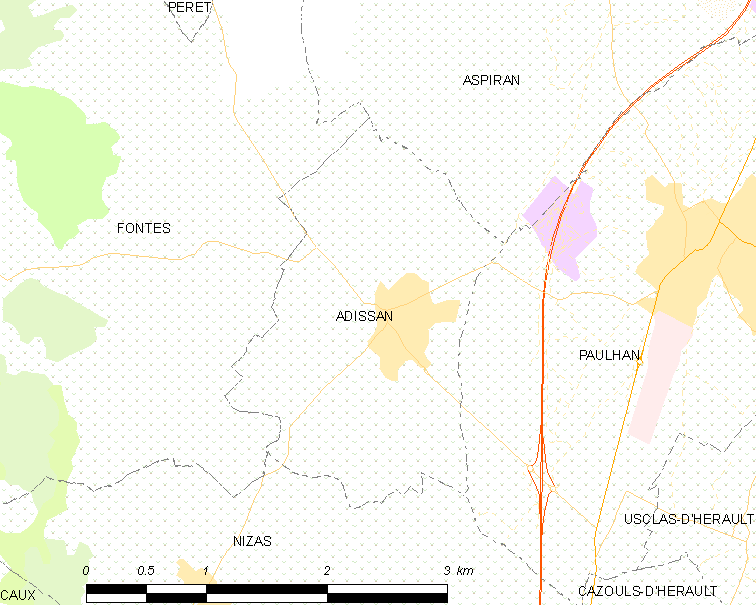
Map

== See also ==
- Communes of the Hérault department
