= Nizas, Hérault =

Nizas
- Commune
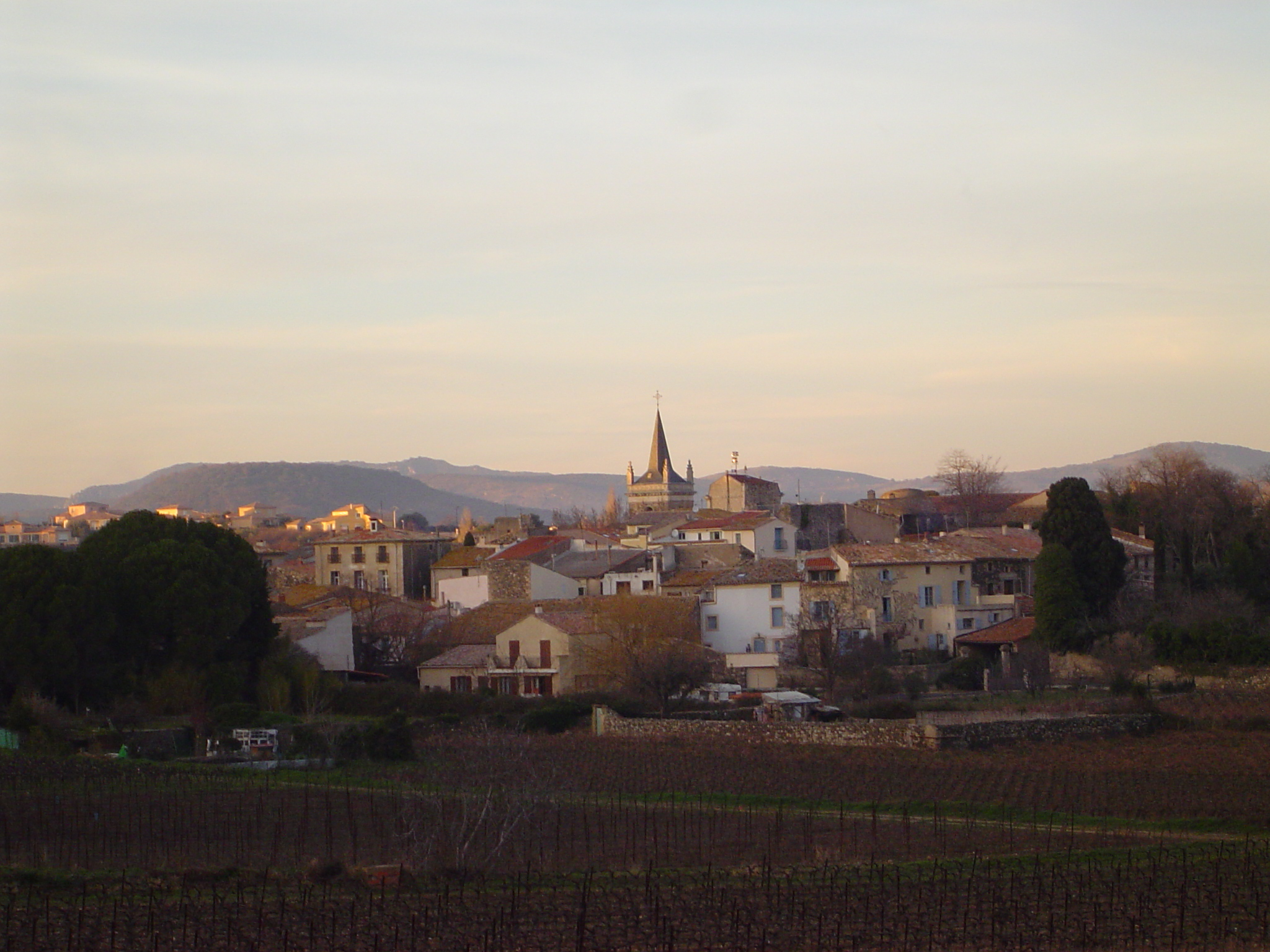
- A general view of Nizas

- Coat of arms
- Location of Nizas
- Location within France Location within Occitanie
- Coordinates: 43°30′50″N 3°24′30″E
- Country: France
- Region: Occitania
- Department: Hérault
- Arrondissement: Béziers
- Canton: Mèze
- Intercommunality: CA Hérault Méditerranée

Government
  - Mayor (2020–2026): Daniel Renaud
- Area^{1}: 8.53 km^{2} (3.29 sq mi)
- Elevation: 72 m (236 ft)
- Highest elevation: 131 m (430 ft)
- Lowest elevation: 19 m (62 ft)
- Population (2023): 662
  - Density: 77.6/km^{2} (201/sq mi)
- Time zone: UTC+01:00 (CET)
  - Summer (DST): UTC+02:00 (CEST)
- INSEE/Postal code: 34184 /34320
- ^{1} French Land Register data, which excludes lakes, ponds, glaciers > 1 km^{2} (0.386 sq mi or 247 acres) and river estuaries.

Nizas (French pronunciation: [nizas]; Occitan: Nisaç) is a commune in the Hérault department in the Occitanie region in southern France.

It lies near the town Pézenas.

== History ==
Like many places in Languedoc-Roussillon, the village of Nizas has been continuously inhabited since prehistoric time. The vicinity of the village is rich in archeological sites, such as proto-anthropomorphic stele of Pla Méjo and la grotte de l'Homme Mort, both from the Chalcolithic period.

The origins of the village of Nizas are certainly Roman, although there are remains from Greek amphora manufacturing processes in neighbouring villages. There are evidences of Roman foundations from the 1st century AD under the early 18th-century church in the center of the village.

The name Nizas derived from the name of a Latin nobleman Nisius whose domain is buried under the modern village. Nizas is mentioned in the Carolingian texts (884 AD) as a villa. Following the collapse of the Carolingian Empire, Occitanian peasantry who, prior to 950 lived mostly at dispersed farms, regrouped around castles of local nobles for protection. Thus, the fortified villages or "castra" in Occitan, appeared between 950 and 1050. "Castro Nizacio" is mentioned in time of crusades (1094–1114). The circulade is well preserved in the historical center of the village called quartier de la Villette.

At the end of the 16th century, the Carrion family acquired the fief from the bishop of Lodève and adopted the name Carrion-Nizas. That was Jean-Raymond de Carrion-Nizas ( d. 1624), master-builder of walls of Pézenas, who built or re-built the current castle. The Carrion-Nizas family remained the lords of the village until the French Revolution. The tomb of the Carrion-Nizas family is still in the church chancel.

Archival materials, such as old maps, postcards and photographs, census of population and parochial records going as far back as the early 17th century may be found on line at Archives départementales de l'Hérault.

== Population ==
The inhabitants of Nizas are called Nizaçois in French.

Historical population
Year	Pop.	±% p.a.
1968	504	—
1975	391	−3.56%
1982	398	+0.25%
1990	459	+1.80%
1999	525	+1.50%
2007	554	+0.67%
2012	616	+2.14%
2017	670	+1.69%
2023	662	−0.20%
Source: INSEE

== Sights ==
The present village dates from the 10th century with extensive building in the 12th and 13th centuries giving the characteristic shape of a circulade. This is tight spiral configuration with the outer buildings having thick (up to 3 meters in places) stone walls as a defence. Since 2004, the historical district quartier de la Villette has been a pedestrian zone. The information below is largely based on the tourists signs.

=== Castrum tower ===
The tower is located in quartier de la Villette, the oldest part of Nizas. This four-sided tower (6.5 x 10 m) with walls 1.70m thick was originally surrounded by an enclosure which served as a farmyard to the old chateau.

=== Place du Griffe ===
From the 14th century onwards, the center of the village spread to the west of the original center (quartier de la Villette) around a new square – the Place du Griffe. In this square, in the center of a fountain, there is a statue of Marianne which is more mythological than republican. She is the Greek-Roman goddess Artemis-Diana or Belissena, her counterpart in Celt Iberian cosmos of divinities. She isn't wearing phrygian cap, but a star on her forehead, suggesting the guiding light to lead people from the darkness of ignorance.

=== Church ===
The cornerstone of the present church was consecrated on 13 January 1705, on the site of the former chapel of Saints Perpetue and Felicity which was demolished in 1703. The construction work was completed by August 1708. Saint Perpetue relics are still objects of veneration. The church is open for worship and visits only during the time of service.

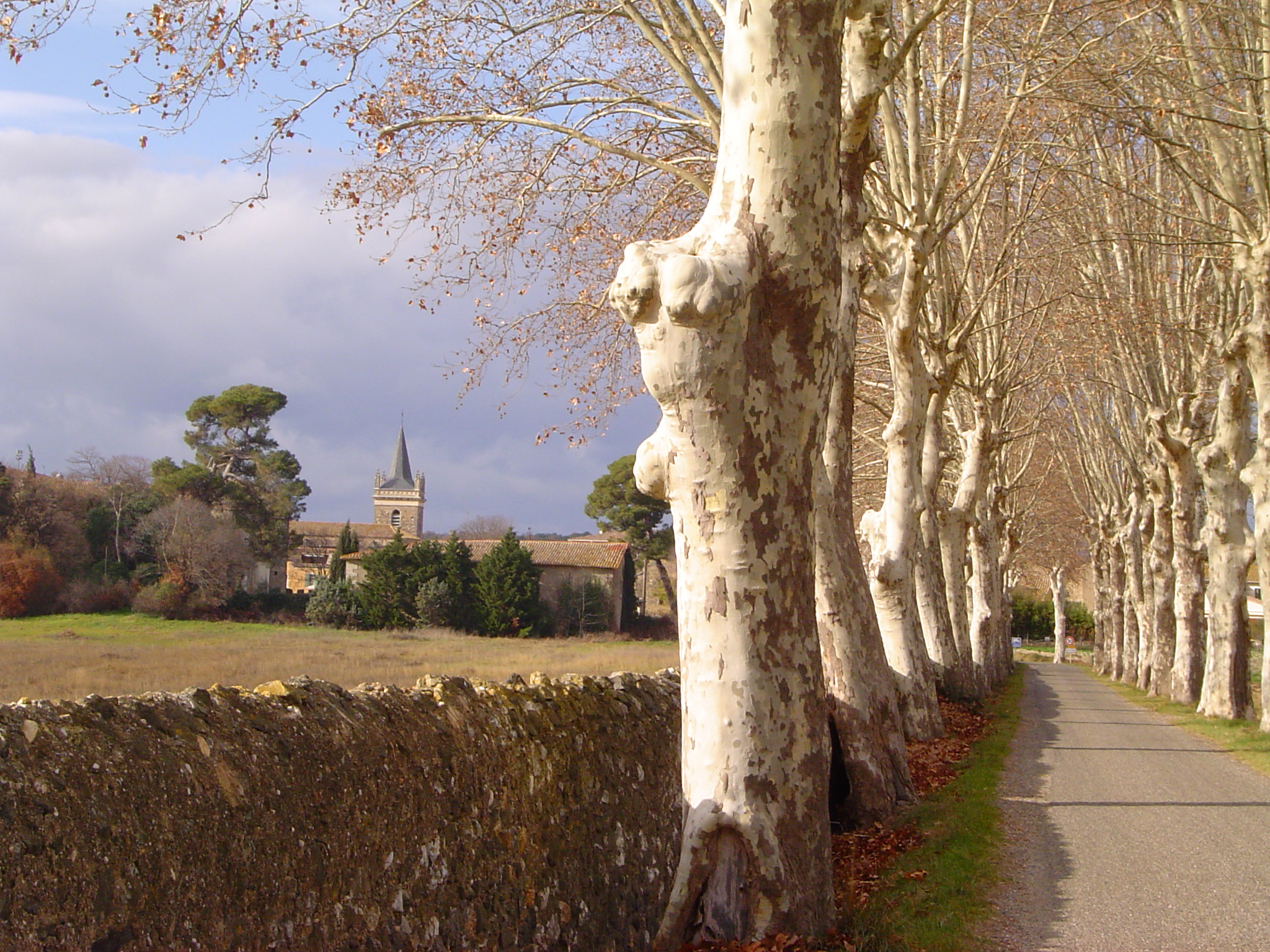
Approaching village of Nizas

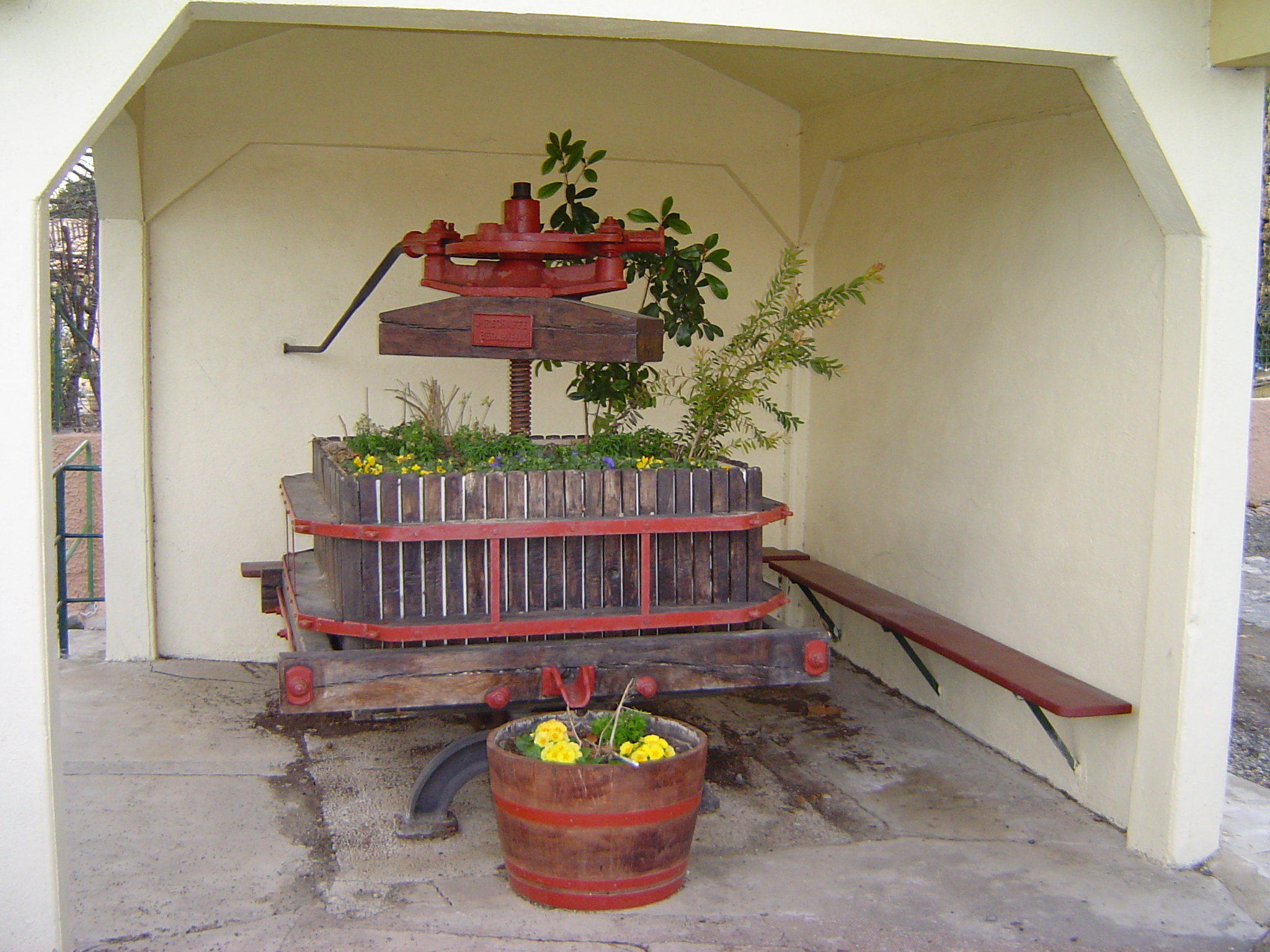
Old wine press converted to flowerbed

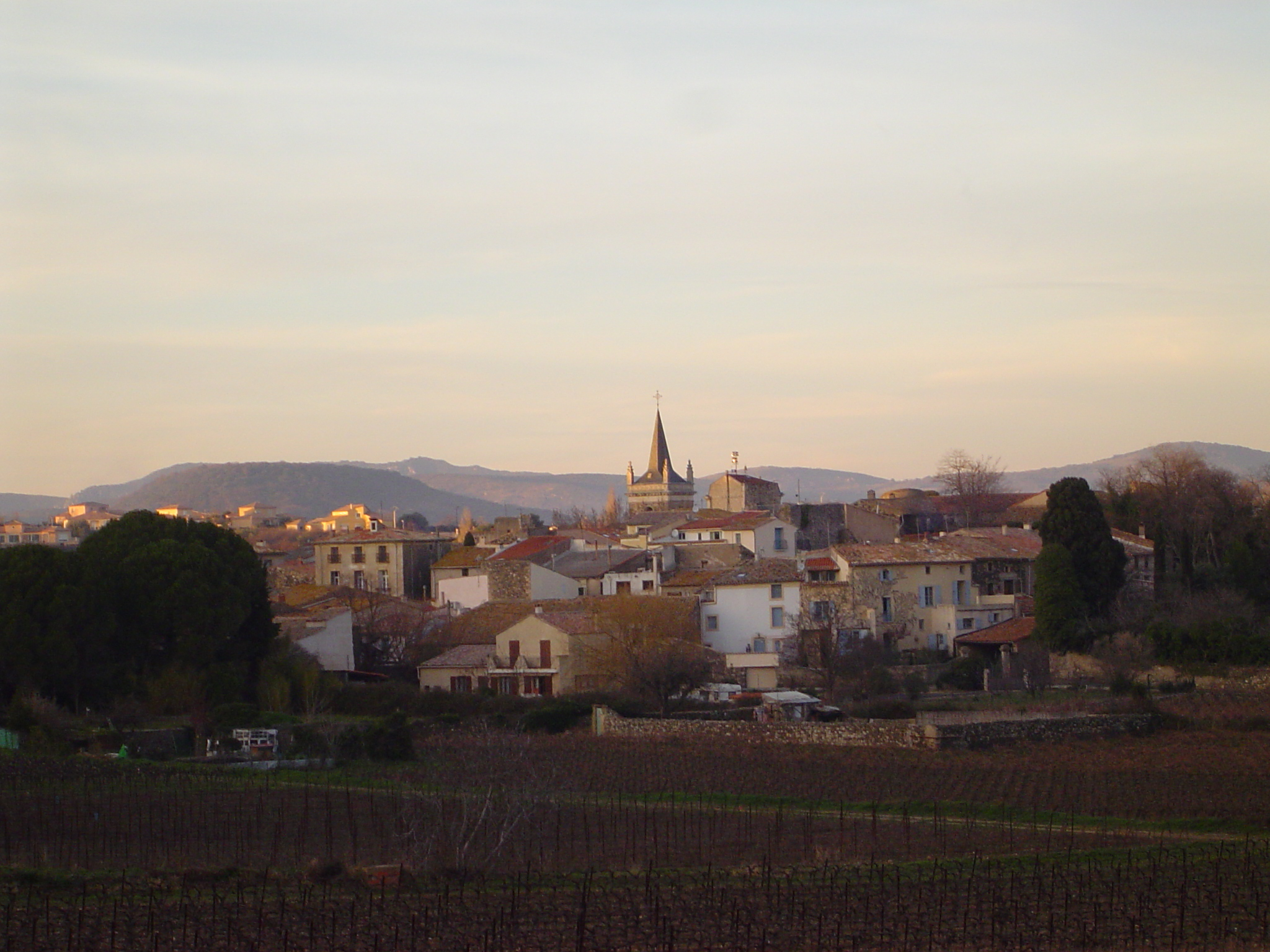
View from a nearby hill at sunset

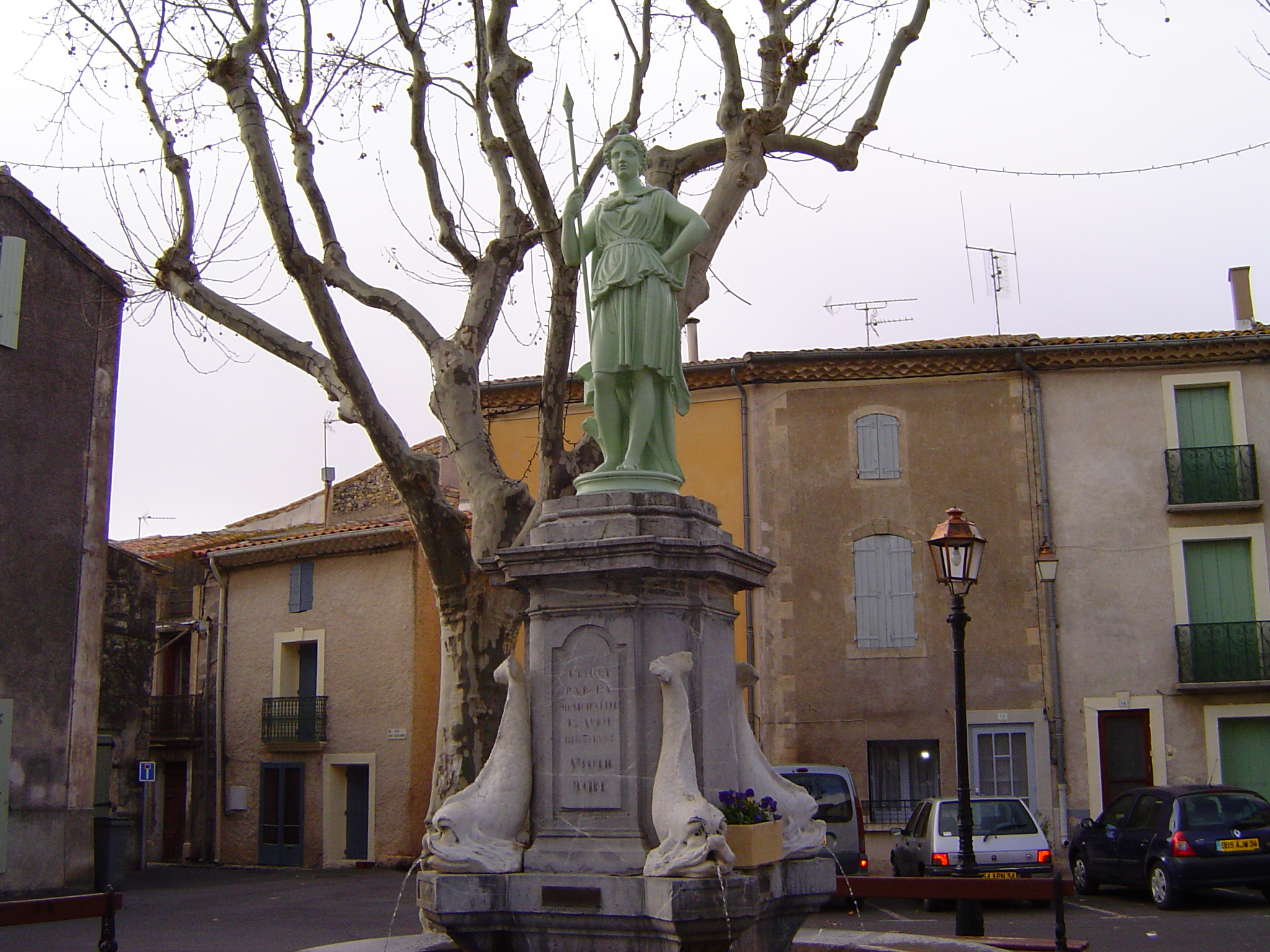
Village square, La place du Griffe

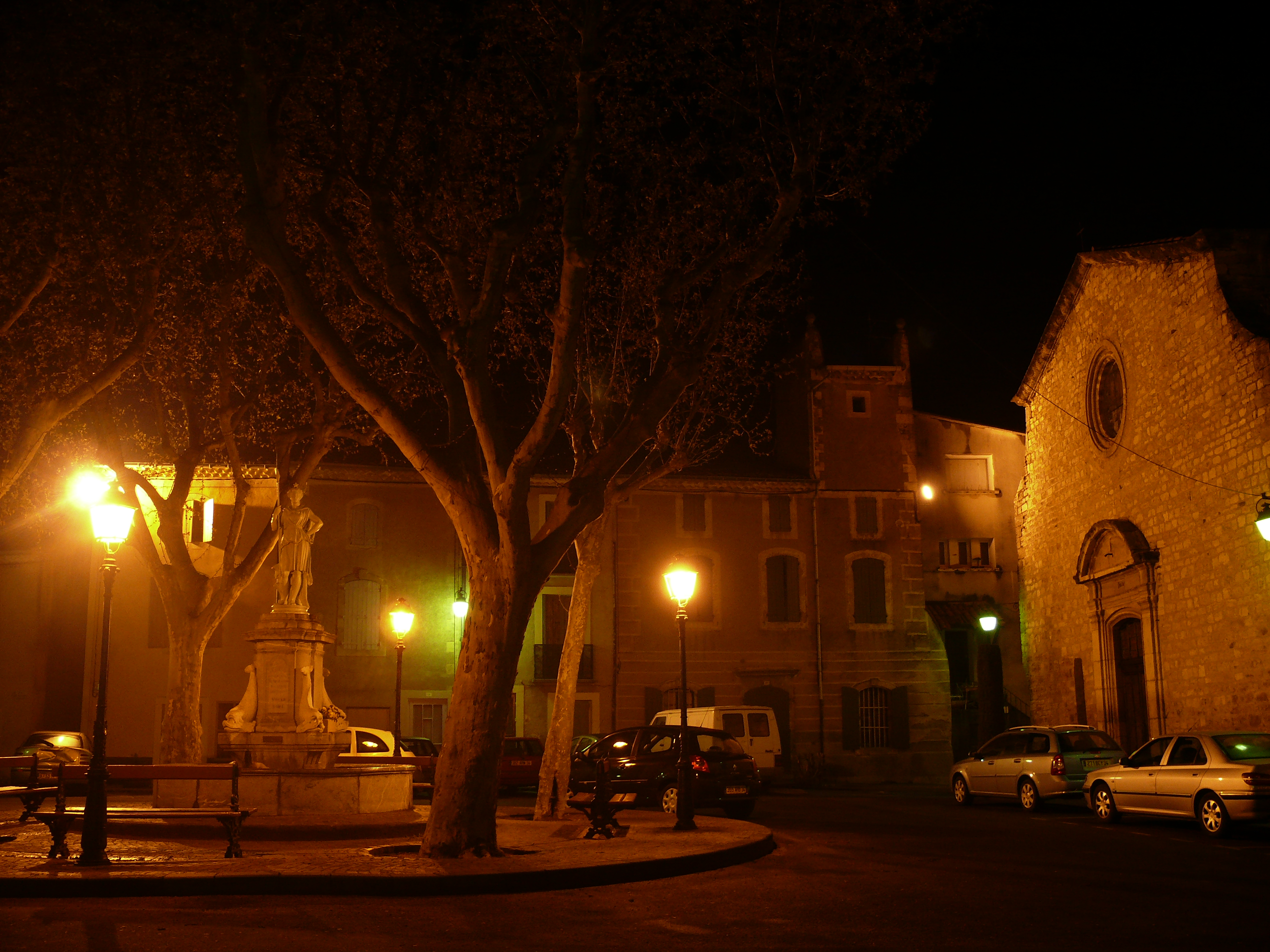
La place du Griffe at night - Cet endroit est brumeux et mystérieux

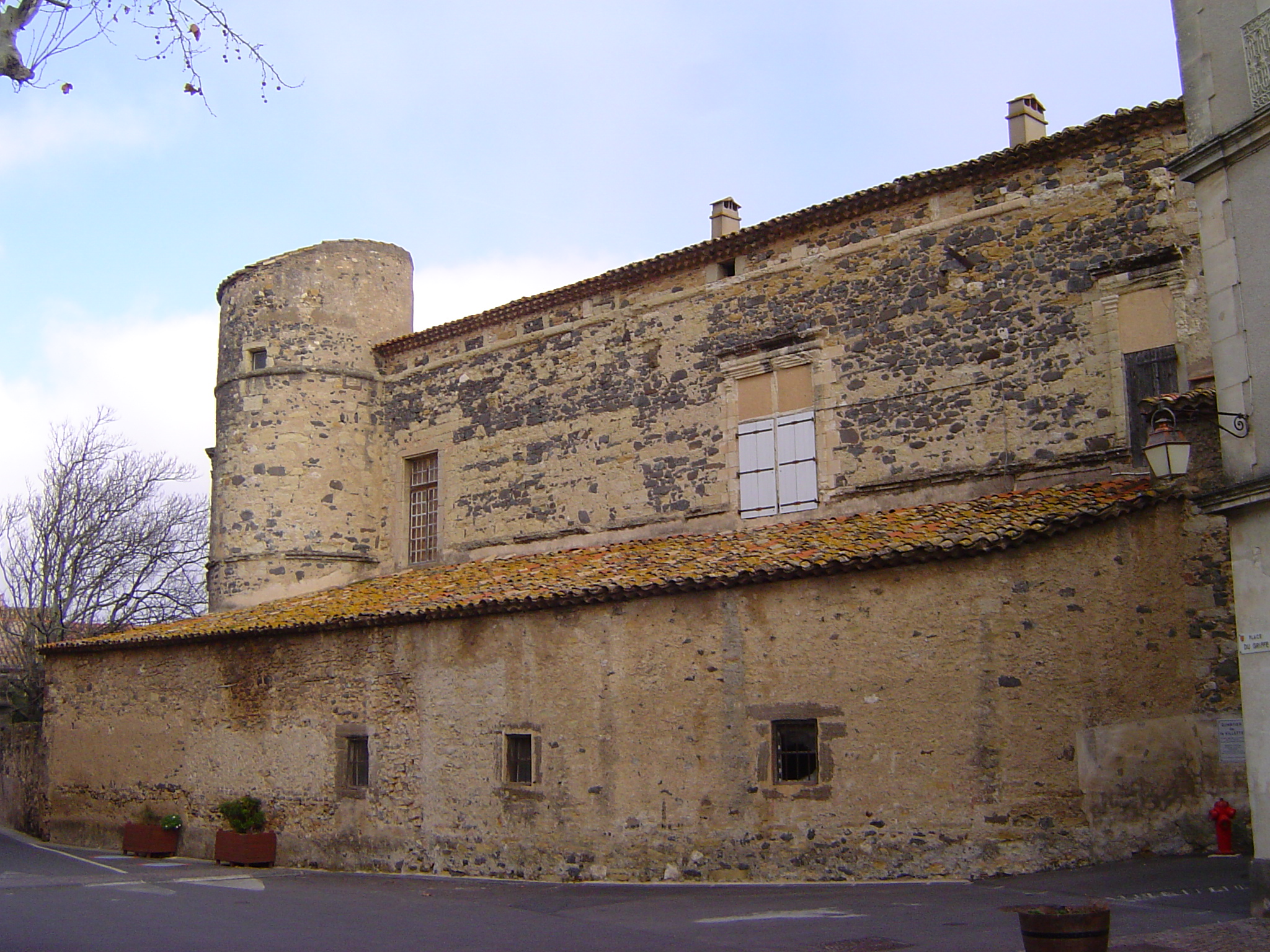
Castle of Carrion-Nizas, who remained the local lords from the late 16th century until the revolution. The castle is closed to public.

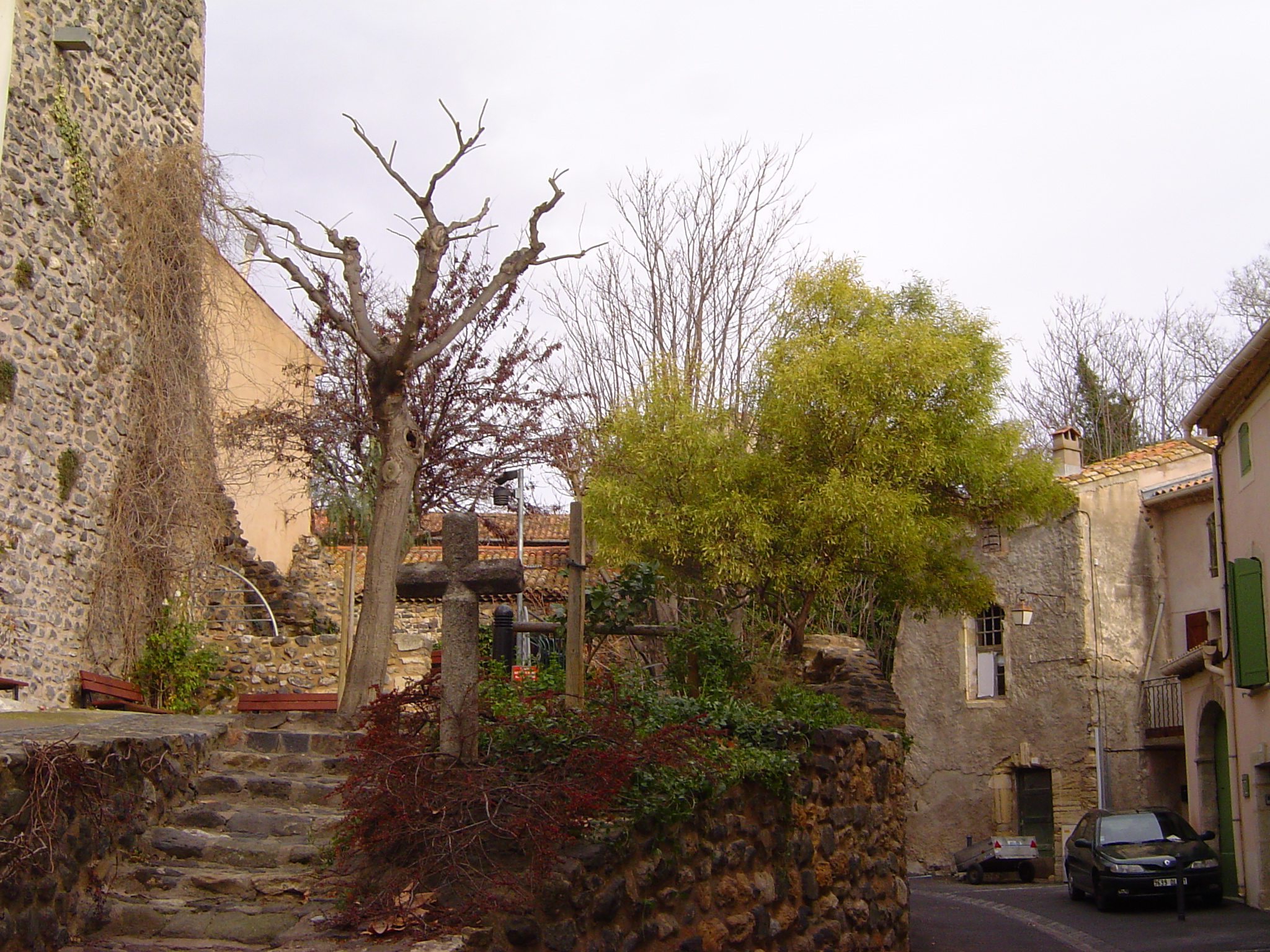
Old part of the village (quartier de la Villette).

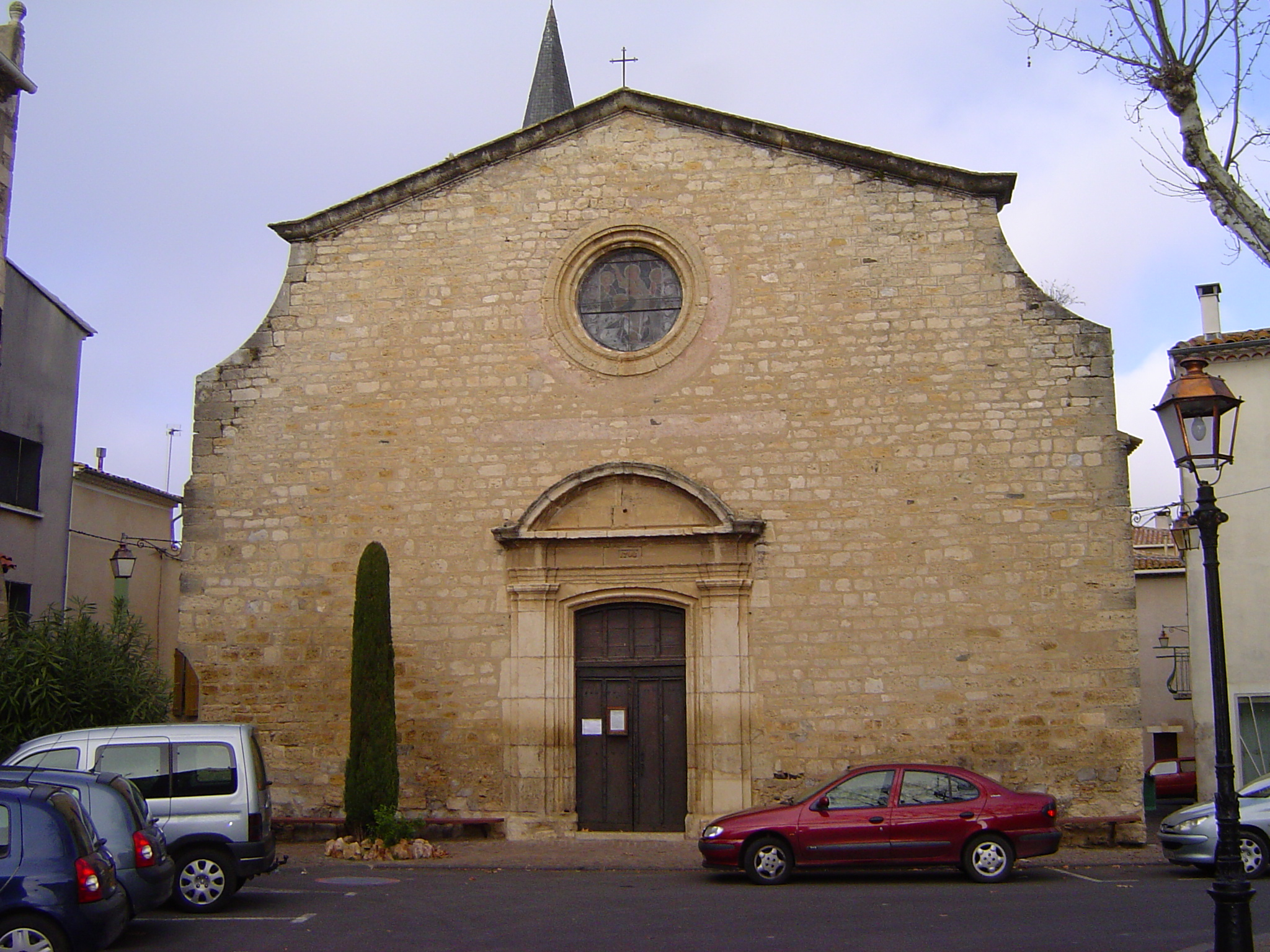
Facade of the village church.

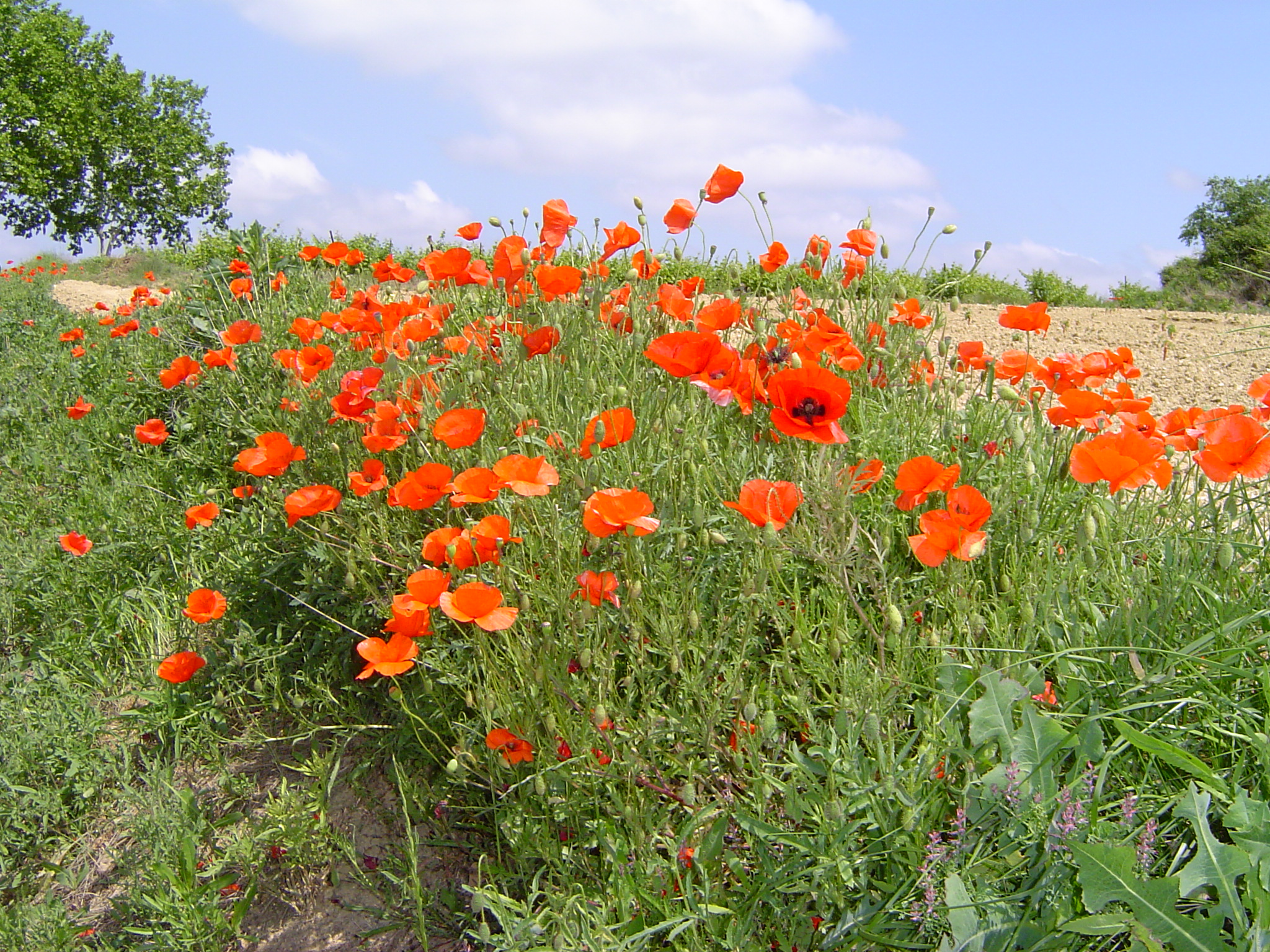
Coquelicot ("Red poppy" in French)

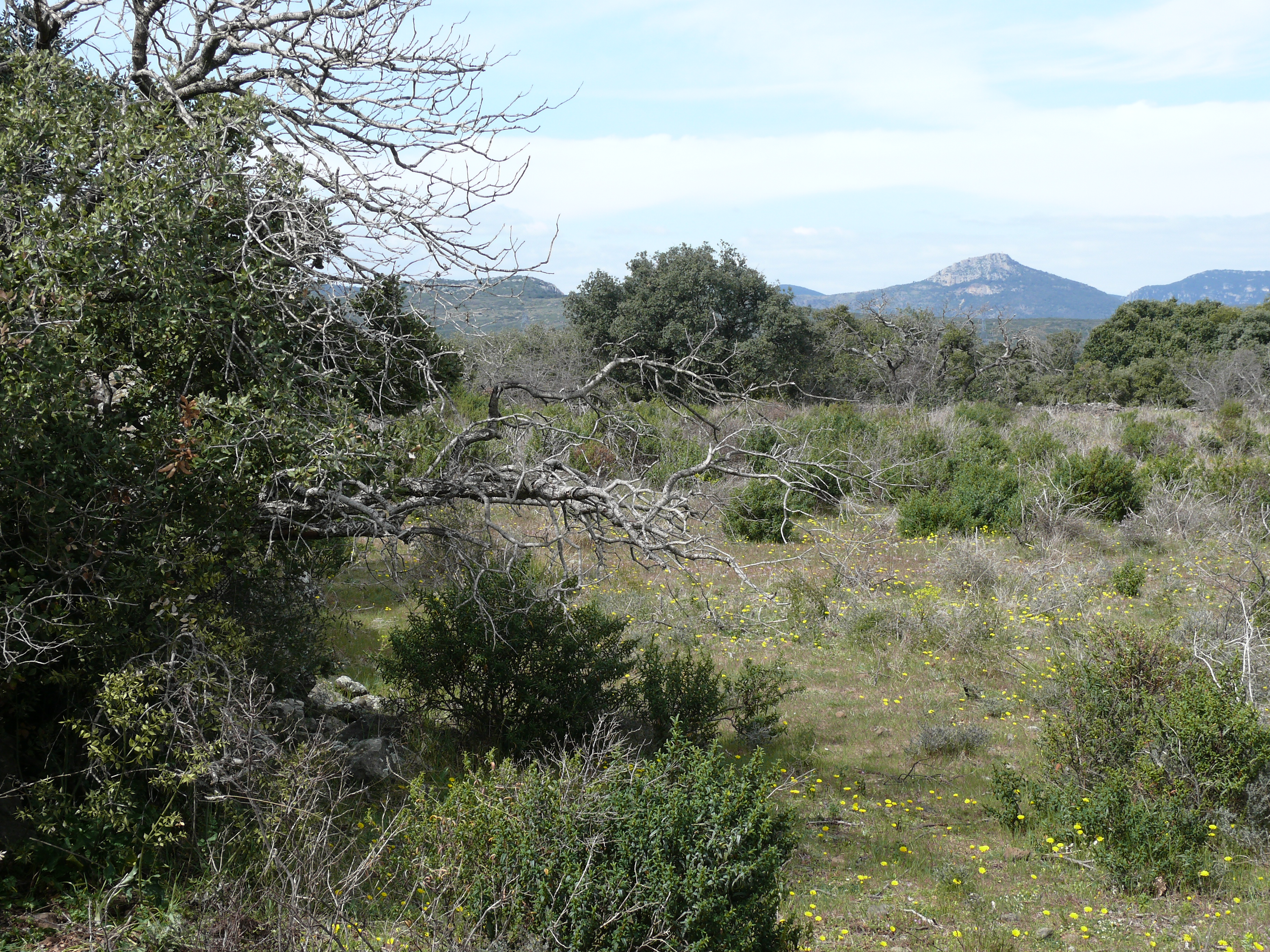
La garrigue ("garriga" in Occitan) - Mediterranean scrubland, Spring time

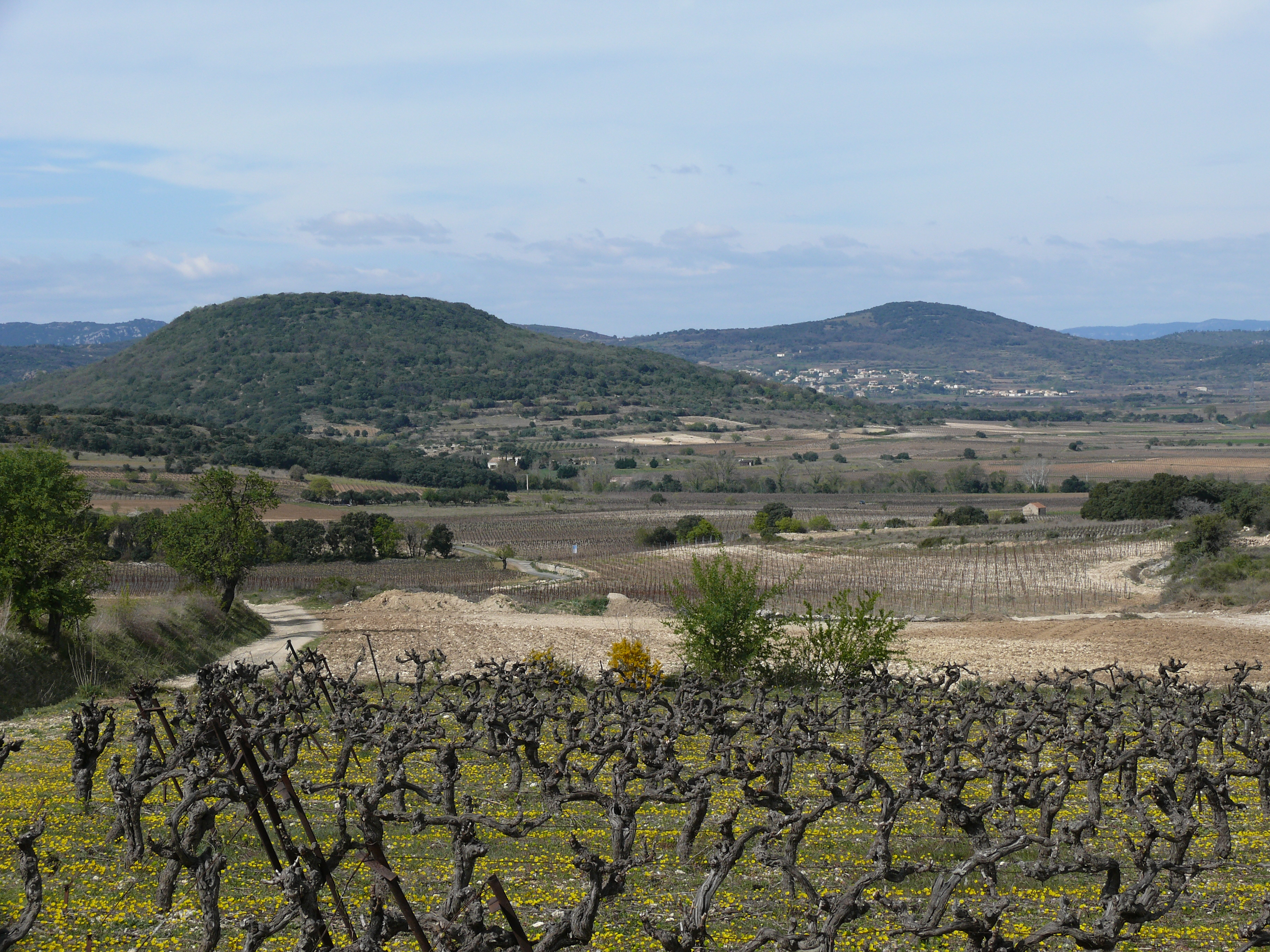
Hills of Herault, Spring time

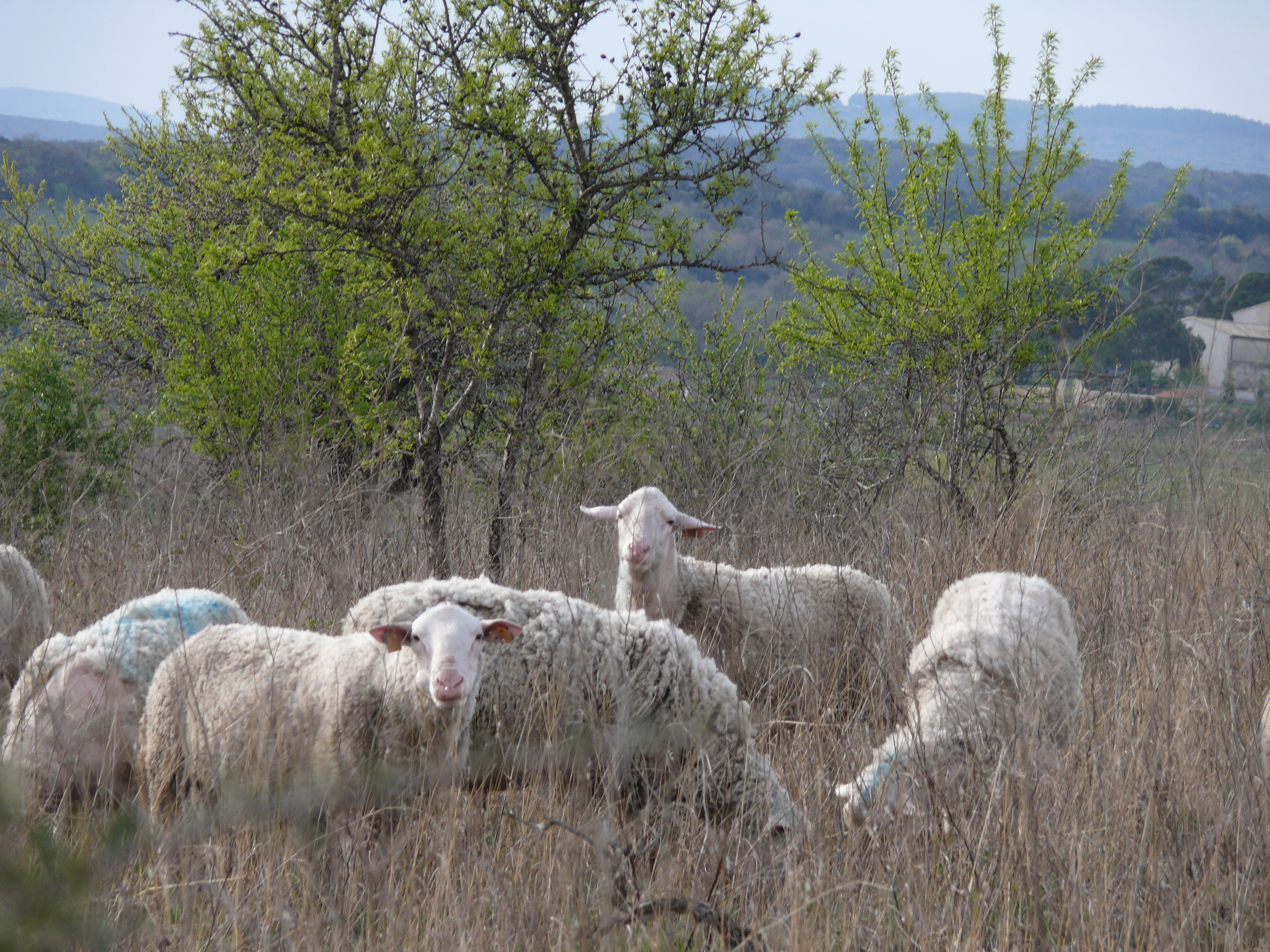
Sheep

== See also ==
- Communes of the Hérault department
