= Usclas-d'Hérault =

- Commune
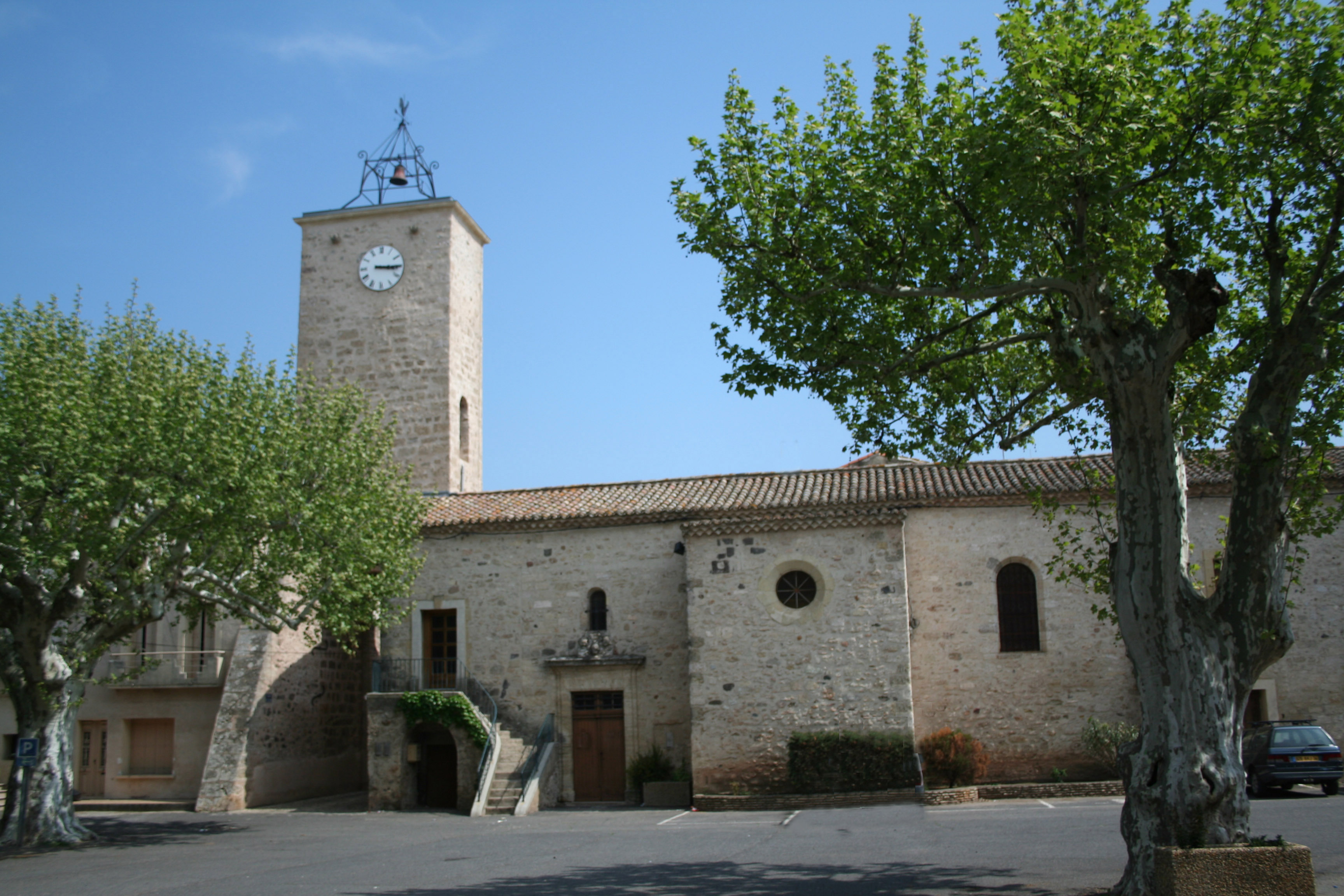
- The church of Usclas-d'Hérault

- Coat of arms
- Location of Usclas-d'Hérault
- Location within France Location within Occitanie
- Coordinates: 43°31′10″N 3°27′54″E
- Country: France
- Region: Occitania
- Department: Hérault
- Arrondissement: Lodève
- Canton: Mèze
- Intercommunality: Clermontais

Government
  - Mayor (2020–2026): Christian Rigaud
- Area^{1}: 2.82 km^{2} (1.09 sq mi)
- Elevation: 24 m (79 ft)
- Highest elevation: 30 m (98 ft)
- Lowest elevation: 18 m (59 ft)
- Population (2023): 439
  - Density: 156/km^{2} (403/sq mi)
- Time zone: UTC+01:00 (CET)
  - Summer (DST): UTC+02:00 (CEST)
- INSEE/Postal code: 34315 /34230
- ^{1} French Land Register data, which excludes lakes, ponds, glaciers > 1 km^{2} (0.386 sq mi or 247 acres) and river estuaries.

Usclas-d'Hérault (French pronunciation: [ysklas deʁo]; Occitan: Usclats d'Erau) is a commune in the Hérault department in the Occitanie region in southern France.

== Population ==
Historical population
Year	Pop.	±% p.a.
1968	166	—
1975	129	−3.54%
1982	134	+0.54%
1990	147	+1.16%
1999	144	−0.23%
2007	264	+7.87%
2012	340	+5.19%
2017	418	+4.22%
2023	439	+0.82%
Source: INSEE

== See also ==
- Communes of the Hérault department
