= Pézenas =

- Commune
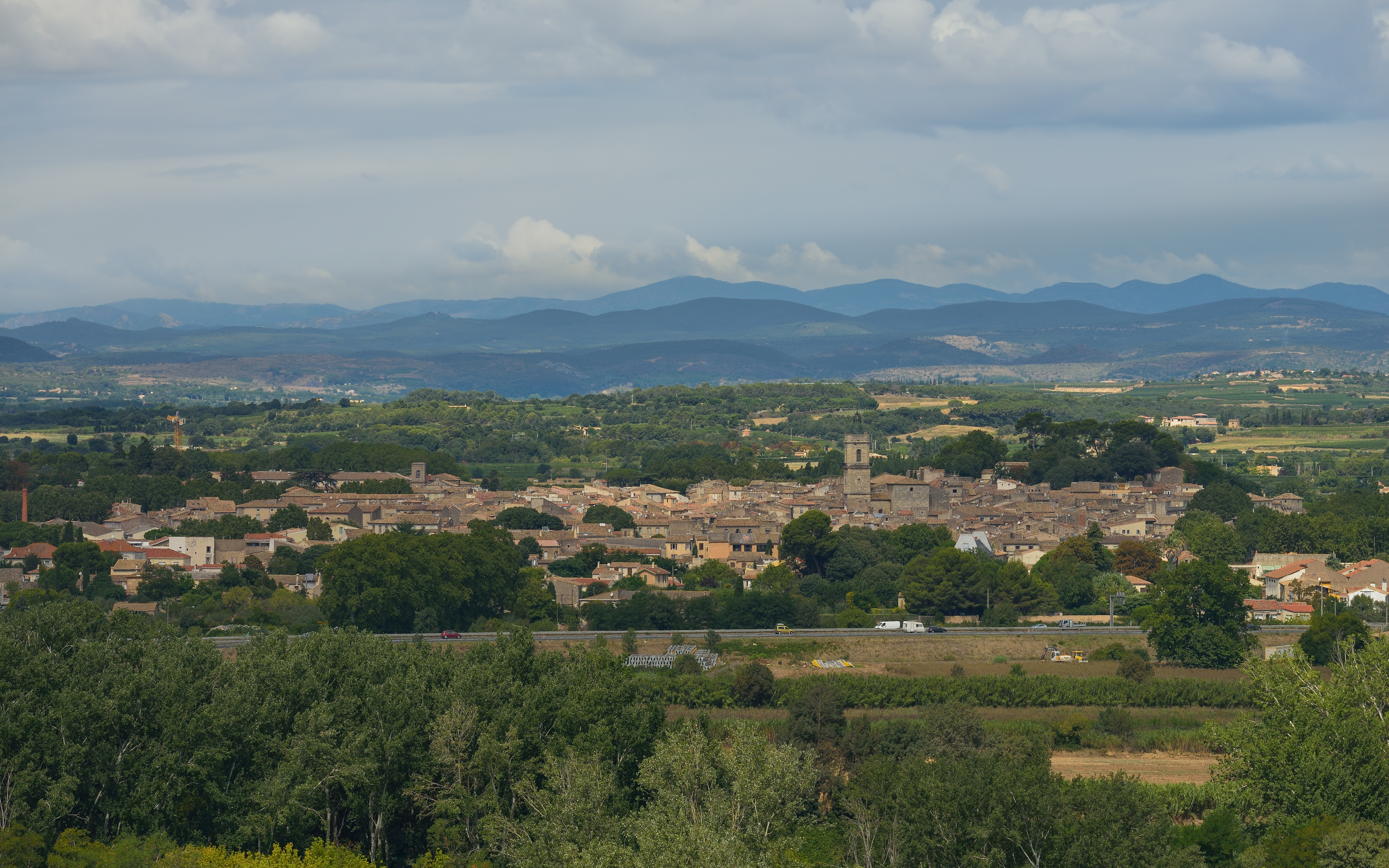
- A general view of Pézenas

- Coat of arms
- Location of Pézenas
- Location within France Location within Occitanie
- Coordinates: 43°27′38″N 3°25′25″E
- Country: France
- Region: Occitania
- Department: Hérault
- Arrondissement: Béziers
- Canton: Pézenas
- Intercommunality: CA Hérault Méditerranée

Government
  - Mayor (2020–2026): Armand Rivière
- Area^{1}: 29.56 km^{2} (11.41 sq mi)
- Elevation: 15 m (49 ft)
- Highest elevation: 96 m (315 ft)
- Lowest elevation: 3 m (9.8 ft)
- Population (2023): 7,797
  - Density: 263.8/km^{2} (683.2/sq mi)
- Time zone: UTC+01:00 (CET)
  - Summer (DST): UTC+02:00 (CEST)
- INSEE/Postal code: 34199 /34120
- ^{1} French Land Register data, which excludes lakes, ponds, glaciers > 1 km^{2} (0.386 sq mi or 247 acres) and river estuaries.

Pézenas (French pronunciation: [pez(ə)nas]; Languedocien: Pesenàs) is a commune in the Hérault department in the Occitanie region in southern France.

== Name ==
The name "Pézenas" is derived from the older name Piscenae, probably from the Latin word piscenis, meaning fishpond. According to legend, there was a lake full of fish behind the château. Inhabitants of Pézenas are Piscenois.

== Origins ==
The origins of Pézenas are unclear, but were influenced by three factors: water from the River Peyne, an ancient pre-Roman route from Rodez to Saint-Thibéry and a defensive hill site.

== Population ==
Historical population

Year	Pop.	±% p.a.
1793	7,149	—
1800	6,903	−0.50%
1806	8,059	+2.61%
1821	8,250	+0.16%
1831	7,847	−0.50%
1836	7,978	+0.33%
1841	7,759	−0.56%
1846	7,713	−0.12%
1851	7,375	−0.89%
1856	7,215	−0.44%
1861	7,204	−0.03%
1866	7,574	+1.01%
1872	7,314	−0.58%
1876	7,966	+2.16%
1881	7,364	−1.56%
1886	6,927	−1.22%
1891	6,720	−0.60%
1896	6,595	−0.37%
1901	7,073	+1.41%

Year	Pop.	±% p.a.
1906	6,928	−0.41%
1911	6,940	+0.03%
1921	6,946	+0.01%
1926	7,327	+1.07%
1931	7,364	+0.10%
1936	6,937	−1.19%
1946	6,397	−0.81%
1954	6,530	+0.26%
1962	7,198	+1.22%
1968	9,103	+3.99%
1975	7,707	−2.35%
1982	7,519	−0.35%
1990	7,613	+0.16%
1999	7,443	−0.25%
2007	8,478	+1.64%
2012	8,317	−0.38%
2017	8,280	−0.09%
2023	7,797	−1.00%

Source: EHESS and INSEE (1968-2023)

== Sights ==
Pézenas has had a protected area (Secteur sauvegardé) since June 1965 - the 14th created by the French Ministry of Culture. The ministry lists 118 historical edifices in Pézenas, more than 30 of which are protected after being classified "Historical Monuments". The main sights include:

- The old town centre with narrow streets and Hôtel Privet or Mansions (rather grand Town Houses from the 16th, 17th and 18th centuries, when Pézenas was the seat of the Governors of Languedoc): hôtel de Lacoste, hôtel de Carrion-Nizas, hôtel de Landes de Saint Palais, hôtel Flottes de Sebazan, hôtel d'Alfonce, hôtel Malibran, hôtel l'Epine, hôtel Grasset.
- The Collégiale Saint-Jean church (18th century), designed by Jean-Baptiste Franque, contains an organ by Jean François Lépine.
- Church of Saint-Jean-de-Bébian, romanesque, classed as a Monument historique (historic monument).
- The church of Sainte-Ursule, built in 1686 by the master mason Antoine Carrier, became the parish church after the Concordat.
- Molière Monument (1897) by Jean-Antoine Injalbert.
- Theatre: originally a church built in 1590 - the Chapelle des Pénitents Noirs (chapel of the Black Penitents). After the French Revolution, it was sold as a national asset and converted to a theatre in 1803. Its present internal appearance dates from a general renovation between 1899 and 1901. Subsequently, unchanged, it was used as a theatre until it closed in 1947. The building contains souvenirs of Molière. The property of the commune, the theatre has been classified since 1995 as a monument historique by the French Ministry of Culture. Following more than 10 years of renovation, the richly decorated theatre reopened in May 2012 and may be visited by the public.
- L'illustre Théâtre: theatre in converted warehouse, with performances all year round.
- Musée de Vulliod Saint-Germain: museum with collections illustrating the town's history and a room dedicated to Molière. The hôtel particulier that hosts the museum was donated to the city by François, Baron de Vulliod, during the Second World War.
- Door museum
- Toy museum

== Transport ==
- Road: Route nationale 9, which used to pass through the town centre, was replaced by a bypass which now forms the part of the A75 autoroute from Clermont-Ferrand to Béziers.
- Rail: The nearest main line station is Agde. Two single track lines used to serve Pézenas. The track from Béziers has been removed, though the station (Gare du Nord) still exists as a cultural centre. Although notionally still part of the national rail network, in reality the line from Vias, near Agde, is closed. It was used into the 21st century by occasional freight trains serving a quarry further north. Since at least 2011, a section at St Thibéry, some five miles (8.0 km) to the south of Pézenas, is in use as a 'Pedalorail' leisure facility. However, the track remains in place throughout and the Gare du Midi is extant and in use as a medical centre.
- Air: The nearest international airport is Béziers Cap d'Agde Airport. Daily flights to Paris Orly ceased in early 2009. Since 2008, international services have been established, currently to the UK, Belgium, Germany and Sweden. There are also flights to Beauvais. Montpellier, Nîmes, Perpignan and Carcassonne airports are all within easy reach. A small grass airstrip at nearby Nizas was closed in 2014 for the expansion of a quarry.

== Climate ==
Climate data for Pézenas (1991–2020 averages)
Month	Jan	Feb	Mar	Apr	May	Jun	Jul	Aug	Sep	Oct	Nov	Dec	Year
Record high °C (°F)	22.6 (72.7)	24.4 (75.9)	27.8 (82.0)	31.9 (89.4)	34.5 (94.1)	43.0 (109.4)	40.5 (104.9)	40.4 (104.7)	36.2 (97.2)	32.8 (91.0)	25.8 (78.4)	22.8 (73.0)	43.0 (109.4)
Mean daily maximum °C (°F)	12.1 (53.8)	13.1 (55.6)	16.4 (61.5)	19.0 (66.2)	22.8 (73.0)	27.3 (81.1)	30.0 (86.0)	29.7 (85.5)	25.5 (77.9)	21.0 (69.8)	15.8 (60.4)	12.7 (54.9)	20.4 (68.7)
Mean daily minimum °C (°F)	3.6 (38.5)	3.5 (38.3)	5.8 (42.4)	8.5 (47.3)	11.8 (53.2)	15.1 (59.2)	17.3 (63.1)	17.2 (63.0)	13.6 (56.5)	11.2 (52.2)	6.9 (44.4)	3.8 (38.8)	9.9 (49.8)
Record low °C (°F)	−8.5 (16.7)	−8.1 (17.4)	−9.8 (14.4)	−2.0 (28.4)	2.7 (36.9)	6.4 (43.5)	6.9 (44.4)	6.0 (42.8)	4.1 (39.4)	−2.1 (28.2)	−10.1 (13.8)	−8.5 (16.7)	−10.1 (13.8)
Average precipitation mm (inches)	53.7 (2.11)	47.9 (1.89)	47.8 (1.88)	56.1 (2.21)	45.6 (1.80)	29.0 (1.14)	17.5 (0.69)	29.7 (1.17)	60.9 (2.40)	93.3 (3.67)	75.8 (2.98)	50.2 (1.98)	607.5 (23.92)
Average precipitation days	6.0	4.2	4.7	6.1	5.9	3.6	2.5	3.2	4.8	6.3	6.8	5.0	59.0
Source: Météo France

== Personalities ==
Pézenas was the birthplace of:

- Maximilian Spinola (10 July 1780 – 12 November 1857), Italian entomologist
- Émile Mazuc (b. 24 July 1832), author of Languedoc dialect grammar - Grammaire Languedocienne:Dialecte de Pézénas (1899, reprinted 1970 by Slatkine Reprints, Geneva)
- Paul Vidal de la Blache (1845–1918), geographer, regarded as the father of modern French geography
- Louis Paulhan (1883–1963), pioneering French pilot
- Jean Bène (1901–1992), lawyer, politician and Resistance leader
- Boby Lapointe (1922–1972): writer, singer, comedian
- Hippolyte Annex (b. 14 February 1933), French middleweight boxing champion
- Bernie Ripoll MP (b. 6 January 1966), Australian politician, Member for Oxley, Queensland
- Éric Dubus (b. 28 February 1966), former middle-distance runner

People linked with Pézenas

- Molière (Jean-Baptiste Poquelin) (1622–1673), playwright, stayed in Pézenas with his theatre group l'Illustre Théâtre.
- Gabriel François Venel (1723–1775) chemist, author of l'Encyclopédie méthodique de chimie (1796), inventor of seltzer water, lived and worked in the town and has a street named after him. (See French wikipedia article)
- Lord Clive (1725–1774) stayed in the town in 1768 on his way back from India, supposedly giving it the recipe for the Petit Pâté de Pézenas.
- Jean-Baptiste Pillement (1728 – 1808), a Rococo painter, famous for his chinoiserie and landscapes
- Edmond Charlot (1915–2004), editor in Free French Algiers during the 1940s, and discoverer of Albert Camus, lived in Pézenas from 1980.

== Local specialities ==
- Le petit pâté de Pézenas: a small sweet/savoury pie supposedly made to a recipe from Clive of India. (see below)
- Le berlingot de Pézenas: boiled sugar sweets

=== Le petit pâté de Pézenas ===
The size and shape of a large cotton reel, these little sweet, spiced mutton pies are a golden brown, with crispy pastry and a moist, sweet interior. They can be eaten as an hors d'oeuvre, with a salad or as a dessert. They are cooked in patisseries all over the town, but their origin is far from local. Tradition has it that Lord Clive brought the recipe from India and taught it to the pastry makers of Pézenas when he was staying at the Château de Larzac in 1768. It is more likely that his servants were responsible.

In the BBC TV programme MasterChef: The Professionals, broadcast on 27 November 2012, Michel Roux, Jr. demonstrated how to cook the dish and set it as the classic recipe for contestants to make.

== Le Poulain de Pézenas ==
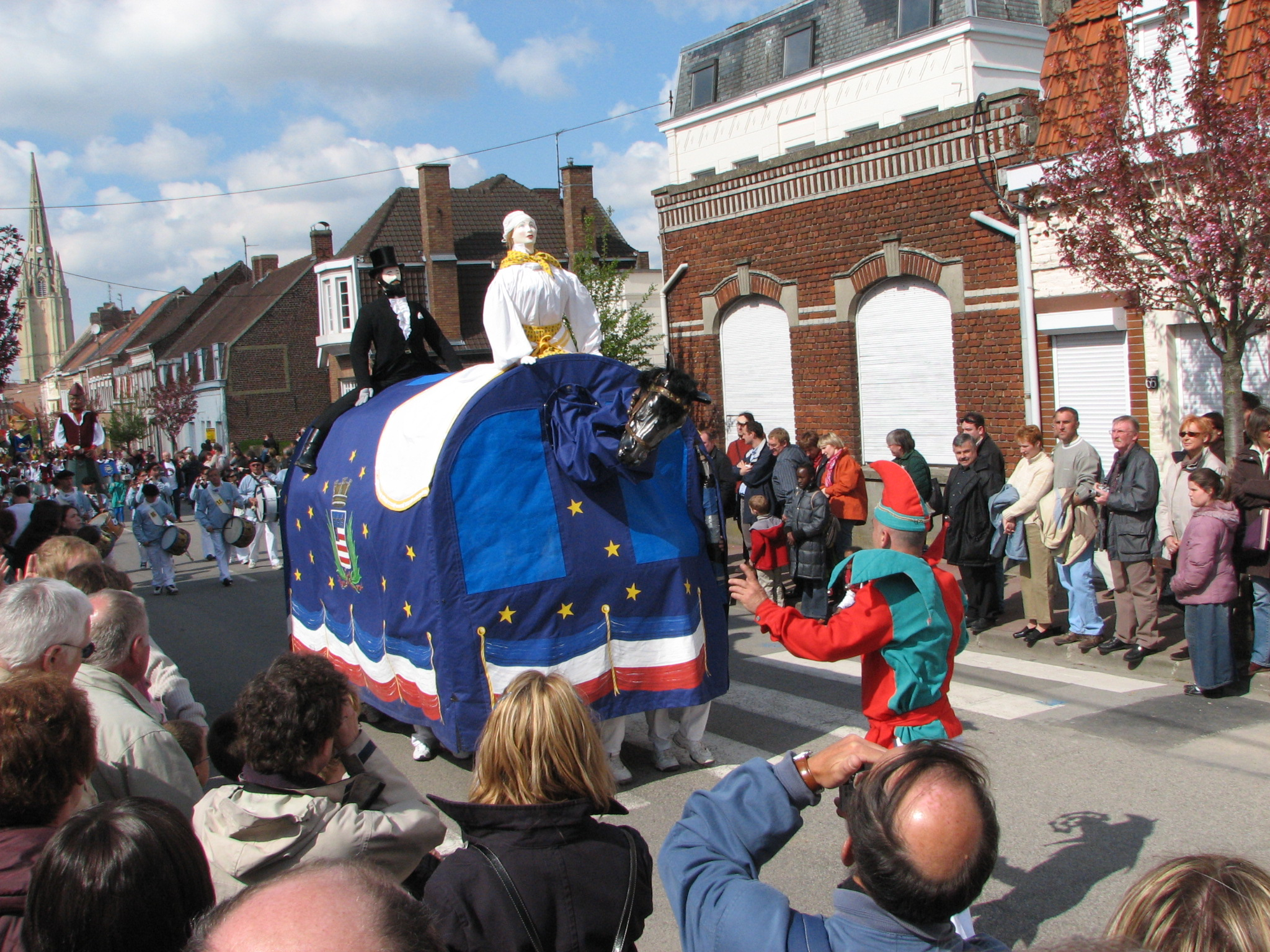
The Poulain from Pézenas (visiting Steenvoorde, in northeast France, for the Festival of Giants in 2006)

Like several of the surrounding towns and villages, Pézenas has a "totem animal"; in this case a huge hobby horse called Le Poulain (lo poulain or lo polin in Occitan), which means "the colt". It is said to commemorate a visit to the town in 1226 by Louis VIII, during which the king's favourite mare fell ill. She had to be left behind in Pézenas while Louis continued with the Albigensian Crusade. On his return he was astonished to find that not only was his mare now fully recovered, but she had also given birth to a fine colt, which was duly presented to him, adorned with ribbons. In return he decreed that the town should construct a wooden colt to be used to celebrate all its public festivities. The first mention of the custom is in 1615. The earliest publication of the legend accounting for the horse's existence dates from 1701.

The Poulain appears for Mardi Gras and other festive occasions. It is carried by nine men and led by another, accompanied by a band of musicians. The Poulain has a realistically carved wooden head, with snapping jaws and an extending neck that can reach up to first-floor windows; l'obole (small amounts of money) or other offerings put into its mouth tumble down inside its neck. Its semi-cylindrical body is covered with a dark blue cloth decorated with stars and the coat of arms of Pézenas. Below the frame it has a tricolor skirt.

The Poulain carries two effigies on its back, one male, one female, called Estieinou and Estieinette or Estieineta (sometimes spelled Estiénon and Estiéneta in the French manner), recalling another royal occasion when Louis XIII visited the town in 1622. A follower of the King, the Maréchal de Bassompierre, was crossing the river Peyne on horseback. He saw a peasant-woman attempting the crossing on foot and gallantly offered her a seat on his horse. The unlikely couple's arrival in the town caused great amusement and the two effigies were made to remember the event.

== International relations ==
Pézenas is twinned with Market Drayton, England, birthplace of Lord Clive, Clive of India

- (United Kingdom) Market Drayton, Shropshire, UK

== See also ==
- Communes of the Hérault department
- Occitan (local currency) – Community currency in Pézenas, France
