= Communauté d'agglomération Hérault Méditerranée =

Hérault Méditerranée
- Communauté d'agglomération
- Interactive map of Hérault Méditerranée
- Coordinates: 43°24′N 03°27′E
- Country: France
- Region: Occitania
- Department: Hérault
- No. of communes: {{{nbcomm}}}
- Established: 2002
- Area: 386.6 km^{2} (149.3 sq mi)
- Population (2019): 80,259
  - Density: 207.6/km^{2} (537.7/sq mi)
- Website: www.agglo-heraultmediterranee.net

Communauté d'agglomération Hérault Méditerranée is the communauté d'agglomération, an intercommunal structure, centred on the town of Agde. It is located in the Hérault department, in the Occitania region, southern France. Created in 2002, its seat is in Saint-Thibéry. Its area is 386.6 km^{2}. Its population was 80,259 in 2019, of which 29,600 in Agde proper.

== Composition ==
The communauté d'agglomération consists of the following 20 communes:

1. Adissan
2. Agde
3. Aumes
4. Bessan
5. Castelnau-de-Guers
6. Caux
7. Cazouls-d'Hérault
8. Florensac
9. Lézignan-la-Cèbe
10. Montagnac
11. Nézignan-l'Évêque
12. Nizas
13. Pézenas
14. Pinet
15. Pomérols
16. Portiragnes
17. Saint-Pons-de-Mauchiens
18. Saint-Thibéry
19. Tourbes
20. Vias
