= Émile Mazuc =

Marie Joseph Émile Gaston Mâzuc (1832-1905) was a lawyer, landowner and scholar of the languages and dialects of the Languedoc region of France.

He was born on 24 July 1832 in Pézenas, Hérault, France, and was educated at the private school of the Abbey of Sorèze.

Mâzuc was married to Marie Dupuy and they had three children. In 1899, he lived in the Château of Roquelune, in Pézenas.

== Legacy ==
Rue Émile Mâzuc in Pézenas is named for him.

== Bibliography ==
- Grammaire Languedocienne, Dialecte de Pézenas, Toulouse: 1899, Slatkine Reprints, Geneva: 1970

Of the original printing, L de G wrote in Revue des Pyrënëes, Volume 11, 1899:

What will be appreciated above all is the considerable labor and the wisdom that [his work] has needed. It will be, in any case, a precious document to consult by all who are interested in our old Langue d'oc in its many local dialects."

- Lou Viache d'Eneas as Enfers, Barchalado en Lengache de Pezenas, Toulouse: 1901
