= Péret =

- Commune
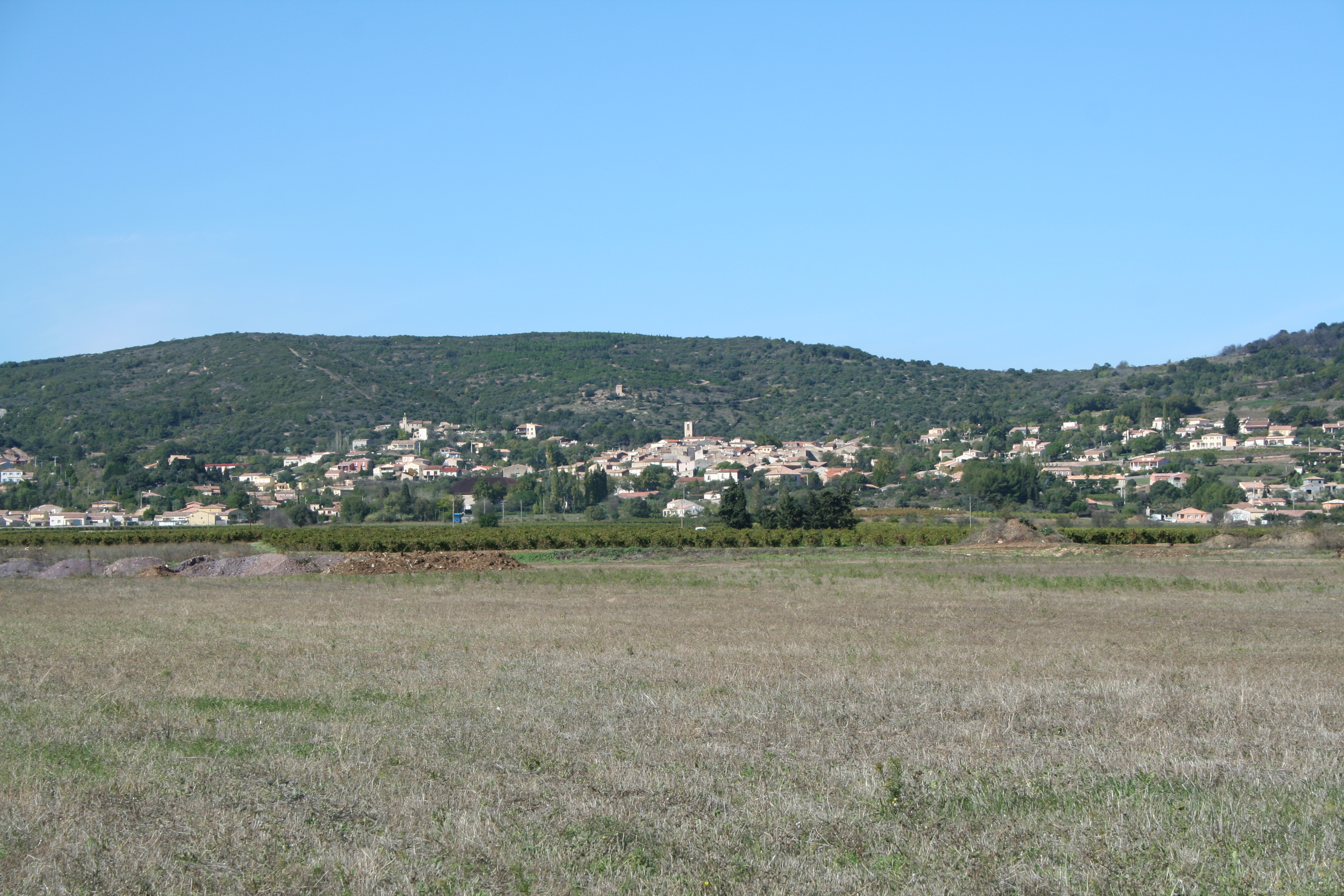
- A general view of Péret

- Coat of arms
- Location of Péret
- Location within France Location within Occitanie
- Coordinates: 43°34′34″N 3°23′53″E
- Country: France
- Region: Occitania
- Department: Hérault
- Arrondissement: Lodève
- Canton: Mèze
- Intercommunality: Clermontais

Government
  - Mayor (2020–2026): Isabelle Silhol
- Area^{1}: 10.97 km^{2} (4.24 sq mi)
- Elevation: 125 m (410 ft)
- Highest elevation: 334 m (1,096 ft)
- Lowest elevation: 74 m (243 ft)
- Population (2023): 1,137
  - Density: 103.6/km^{2} (268.4/sq mi)
- Time zone: UTC+01:00 (CET)
  - Summer (DST): UTC+02:00 (CEST)
- INSEE/Postal code: 34197 /34800
- ^{1} French Land Register data, which excludes lakes, ponds, glaciers > 1 km^{2} (0.386 sq mi or 247 acres) and river estuaries.

Péret (French pronunciation: [peʁɛ]; Occitan: Peret) is a commune in the Hérault department in the Occitanie region in southern France.

== Population ==
Historical population
Year	Pop.	±% p.a.
1968	571	—
1975	520	−1.33%
1982	524	+0.11%
1990	521	−0.07%
1999	560	+0.81%
2007	741	+3.56%
2012	976	+5.66%
2017	1,020	+0.89%
2023	1,137	+1.83%
Source: INSEE

== See also ==
- Communes of the Hérault department
