= Lézignan-la-Cèbe =

- Commune
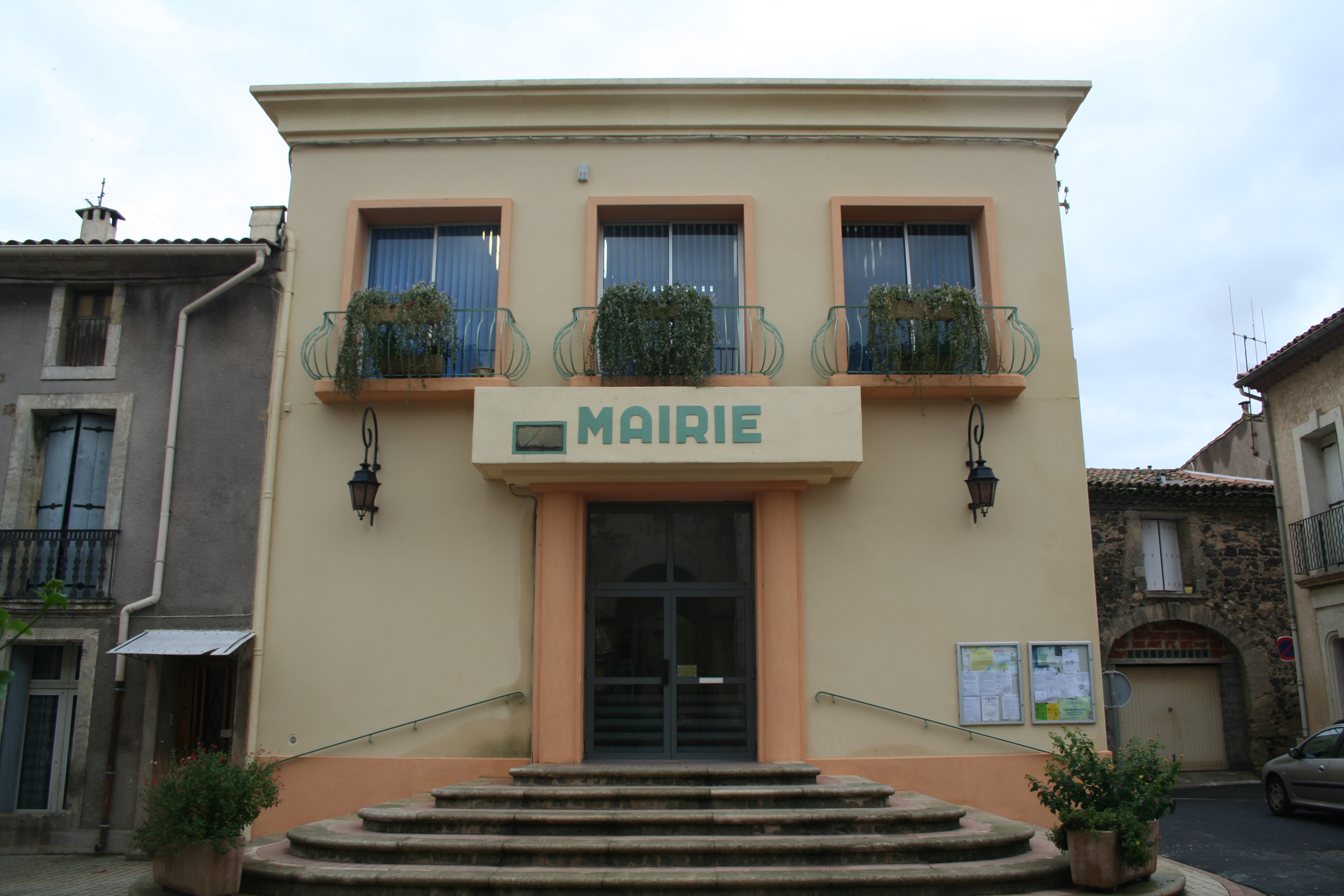
- Town hall

- Coat of arms
- Location of Lézignan-la-Cèbe
- Location within France Location within Occitanie
- Coordinates: 43°29′38″N 3°26′16″E
- Country: France
- Region: Occitania
- Department: Hérault
- Arrondissement: Béziers
- Canton: Mèze
- Intercommunality: CA Hérault Méditerranée

Government
  - Mayor (2020–2026): Rémi Bouyala
- Area^{1}: 6.13 km^{2} (2.37 sq mi)
- Highest elevation: 91 m (299 ft)
- Lowest elevation: 7 m (23 ft)
- Population (2023): 1,580
  - Density: 258/km^{2} (668/sq mi)
- Time zone: UTC+01:00 (CET)
  - Summer (DST): UTC+02:00 (CEST)
- INSEE/Postal code: 34136 /34120
- ^{1} French Land Register data, which excludes lakes, ponds, glaciers > 1 km^{2} (0.386 sq mi or 247 acres) and river estuaries.

Lézignan-la-Cèbe (French pronunciation: [leziɲɑ̃ la sɛb]; Occitan: Lesinhan de la Ceba) is a commune in the Hérault département in the Occitanie region in southern France.

== Population ==
Historical population
| Year | Pop. | ±% p.a. |
|---|---|---|
| 1968 | 736 | — |
| 1975 | 712 | −0.47% |
| 1982 | 838 | +2.36% |
| 1990 | 977 | +1.94% |
| 1999 | 1,013 | +0.40% |
| 2007 | 1,223 | +2.38% |
| 2012 | 1,495 | +4.10% |
| 2017 | 1,546 | +0.67% |
| 2023 | 1,580 | +0.36% |
Source: INSEE

== See also ==
- Communes of the Hérault department
