= Canton of Mèze =

Coordinates: 43.43°N 3.60°E

Mèze
- Canton
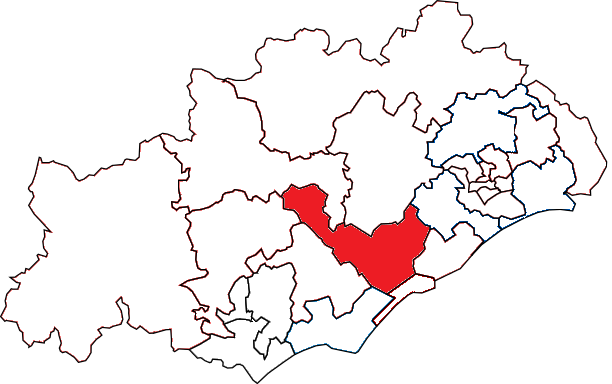
- Country: France
- Region: Occitania
- Department: Hérault
- No. of communes: {{{nbcomm}}}

Government
  - Representatives (2021–2028): Audrey Imbert; Christophe Morgo
- Area: 292.9 km^{2} (113.1 sq mi)
- Population (2023): 43,329
  - Density: 147.9/km^{2} (383.1/sq mi)
- INSEE code: 34 14

The canton of Mèze is an administrative division of the Hérault department, southern France. Its borders were modified at the French canton reorganisation which came into effect in March 2015. Its seat is in Mèze.

== Composition ==
- Adissan
- Aumes
- Bouzigues
- Cabrières
- Cazouls-d'Hérault
- Fontès
- Lézignan-la-Cèbe
- Lieuran-Cabrières
- Loupian
- Mèze
- Montagnac
- Montbazin
- Nizas
- Péret
- Poussan
- Saint-Pons-de-Mauchiens
- Usclas-d'Hérault
- Villeveyrac

== Councillors ==
Election	Councillors	Party	Occupation
2015	Audrey Imbert	DVG	Oyster farmer in Mèze
2015	Christophe Morgo	DVG	Mayor of Villeveyrac
2021	Audrey Imbert	DVG	Oyster farmer in Mèze
2021	Christophe Morgo	DVG	Mayor of Villeveyrac

== Pictures of the canton ==
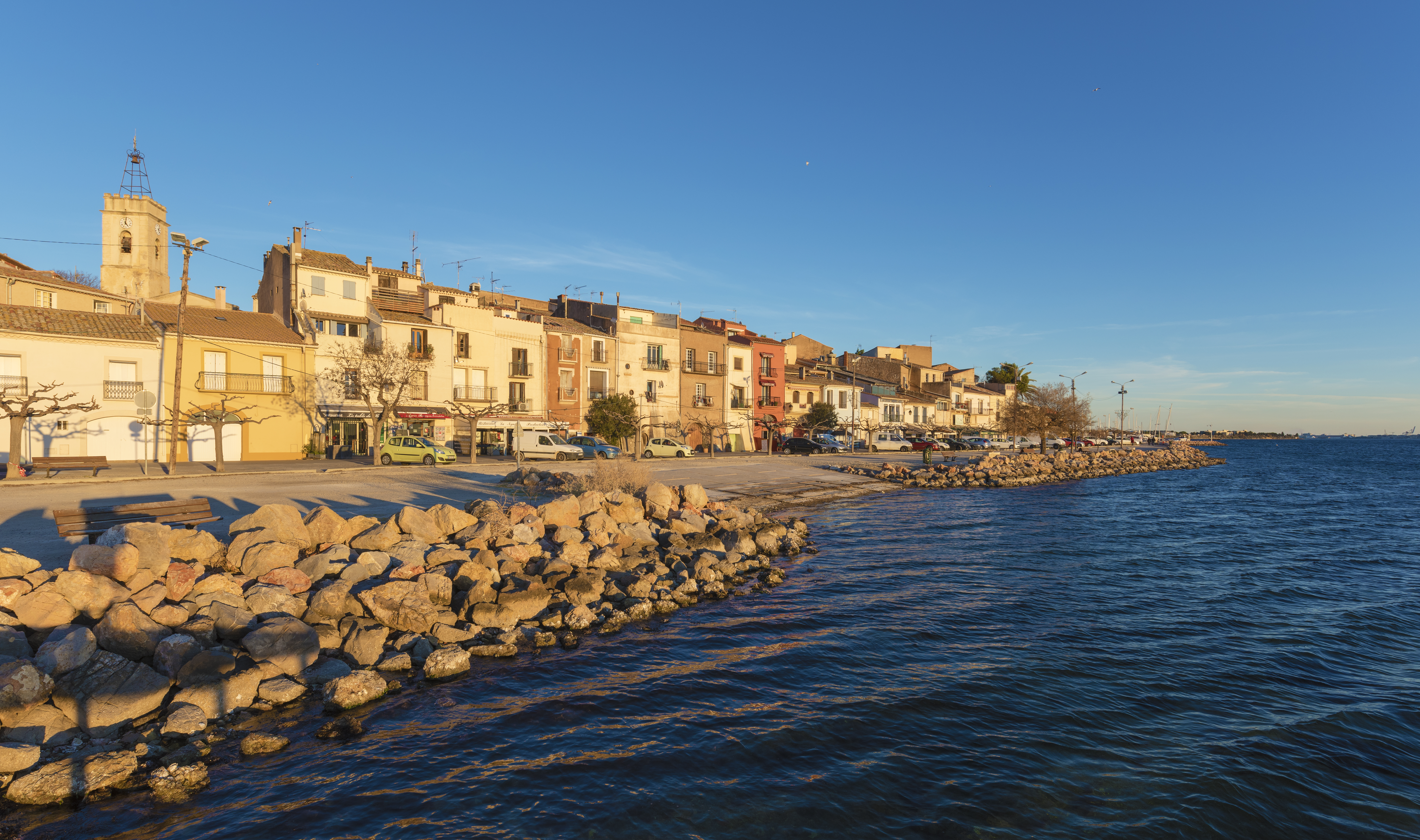
The Étang de Thau in Bouzigues

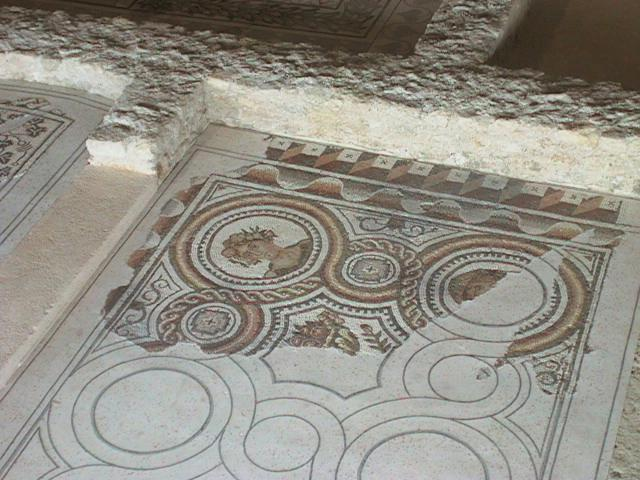
Roman Villa in Loupian

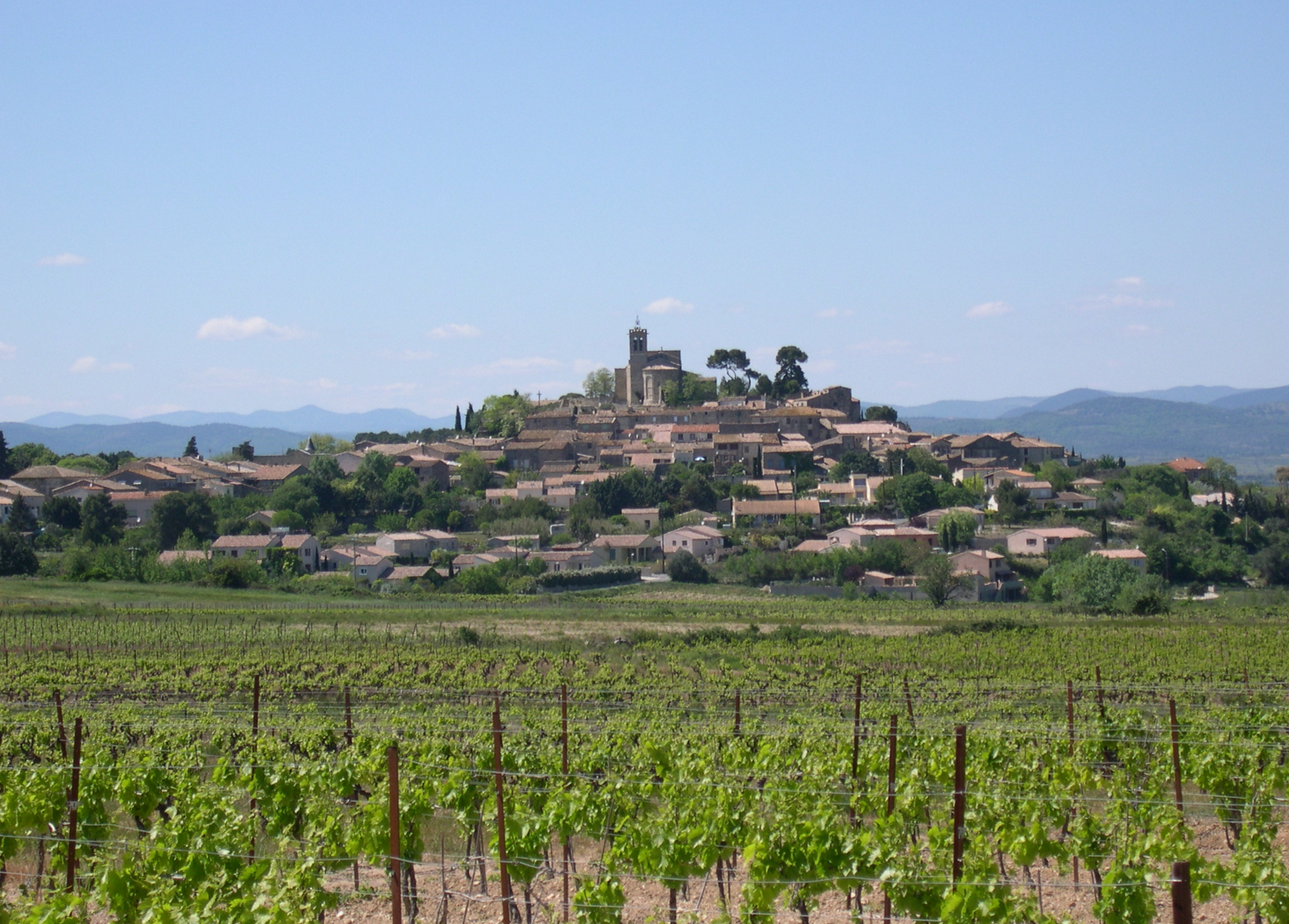
View of Saint-Pons-de-Mauchiens
