= Lieuran-Cabrières =

- Commune
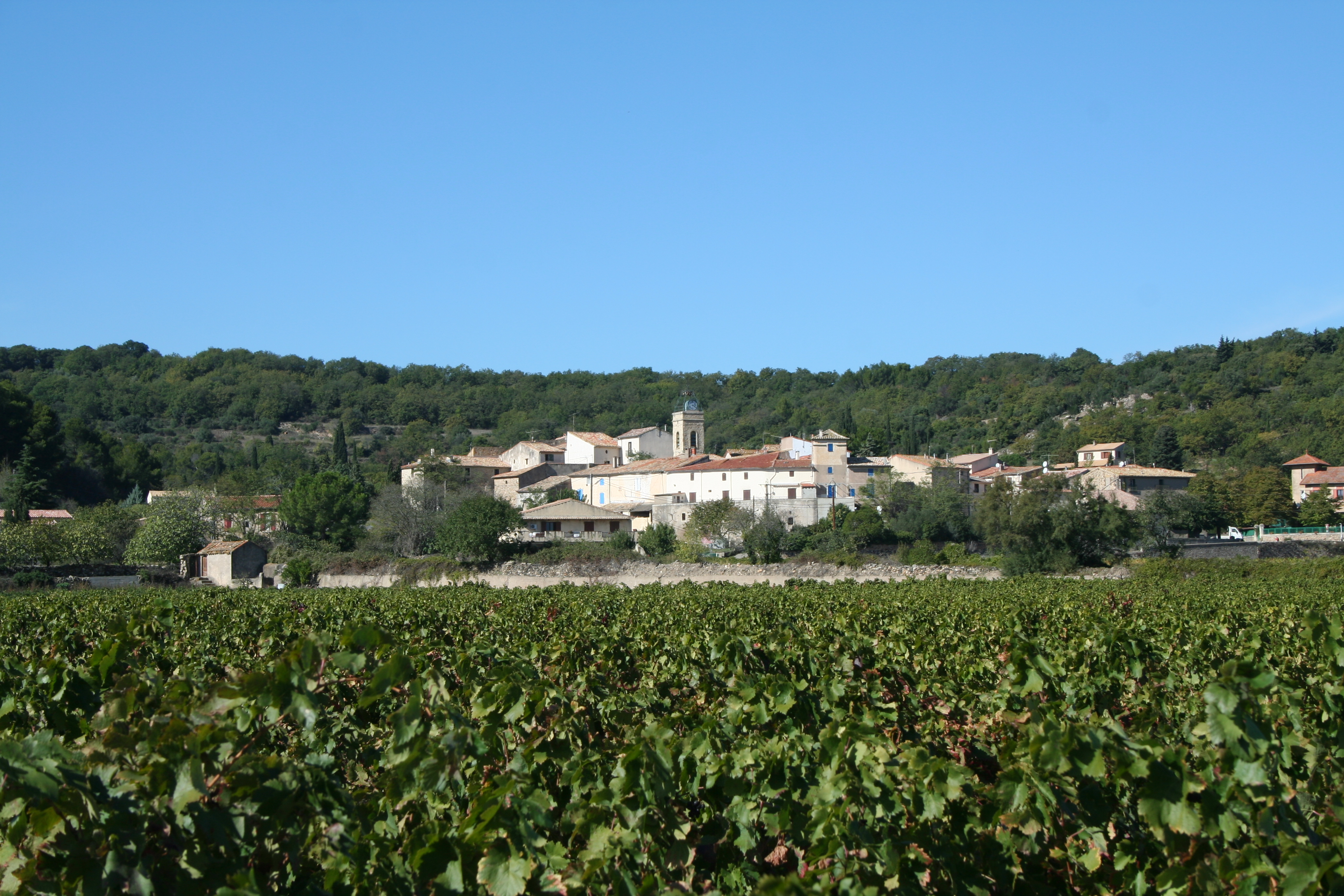
- A general view of Lieuran-Cabrières

- Coat of arms
- Location of Lieuran-Cabrières
- Location within France Location within Occitanie
- Coordinates: 43°35′11″N 3°24′58″E
- Country: France
- Region: Occitania
- Department: Hérault
- Arrondissement: Lodève
- Canton: Mèze
- Intercommunality: Clermontais

Government
  - Mayor (2020–2026): Jean-Philippe Ollier
- Area^{1}: 6.13 km^{2} (2.37 sq mi)
- Elevation: 112 m (367 ft)
- Highest elevation: 323 m (1,060 ft)
- Lowest elevation: 77 m (253 ft)
- Population (2023): 335
  - Density: 54.6/km^{2} (142/sq mi)
- Time zone: UTC+01:00 (CET)
  - Summer (DST): UTC+02:00 (CEST)
- INSEE/Postal code: 34138 /34800
- ^{1} French Land Register data, which excludes lakes, ponds, glaciers > 1 km^{2} (0.386 sq mi or 247 acres) and river estuaries.

Lieuran-Cabrières (French pronunciation: [ljøʁɑ̃ kabʁijɛʁ]; Occitan: Liuran de Cabrièiras) is a commune in the Hérault département in the Occitanie region in southern France.

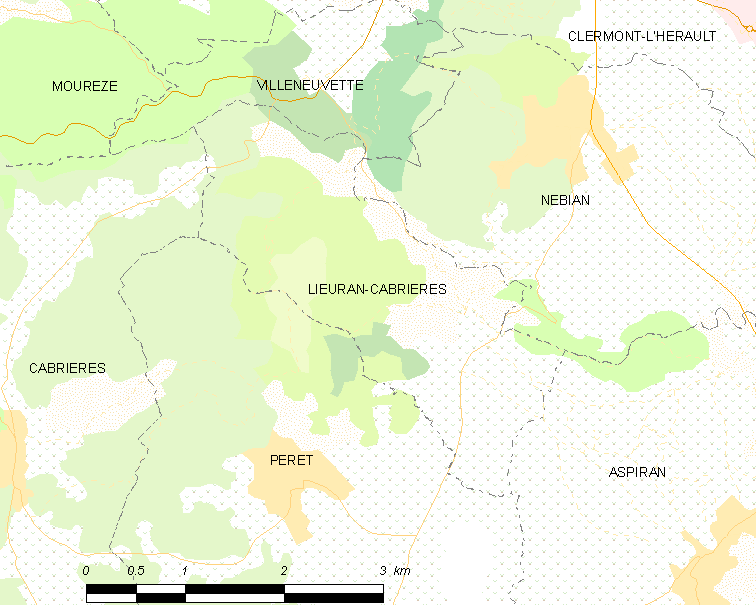
Map

== Population ==
Historical population
Year	Pop.	±% p.a.
1968	181	—
1975	137	−3.90%
1982	140	+0.31%
1990	166	+2.15%
1999	184	+1.15%
2007	258	+4.32%
2012	286	+2.08%
2017	322	+2.40%
2023	335	+0.66%
Source: INSEE

== See also ==
- Communes of the Hérault department
