= Fontès =

- Commune
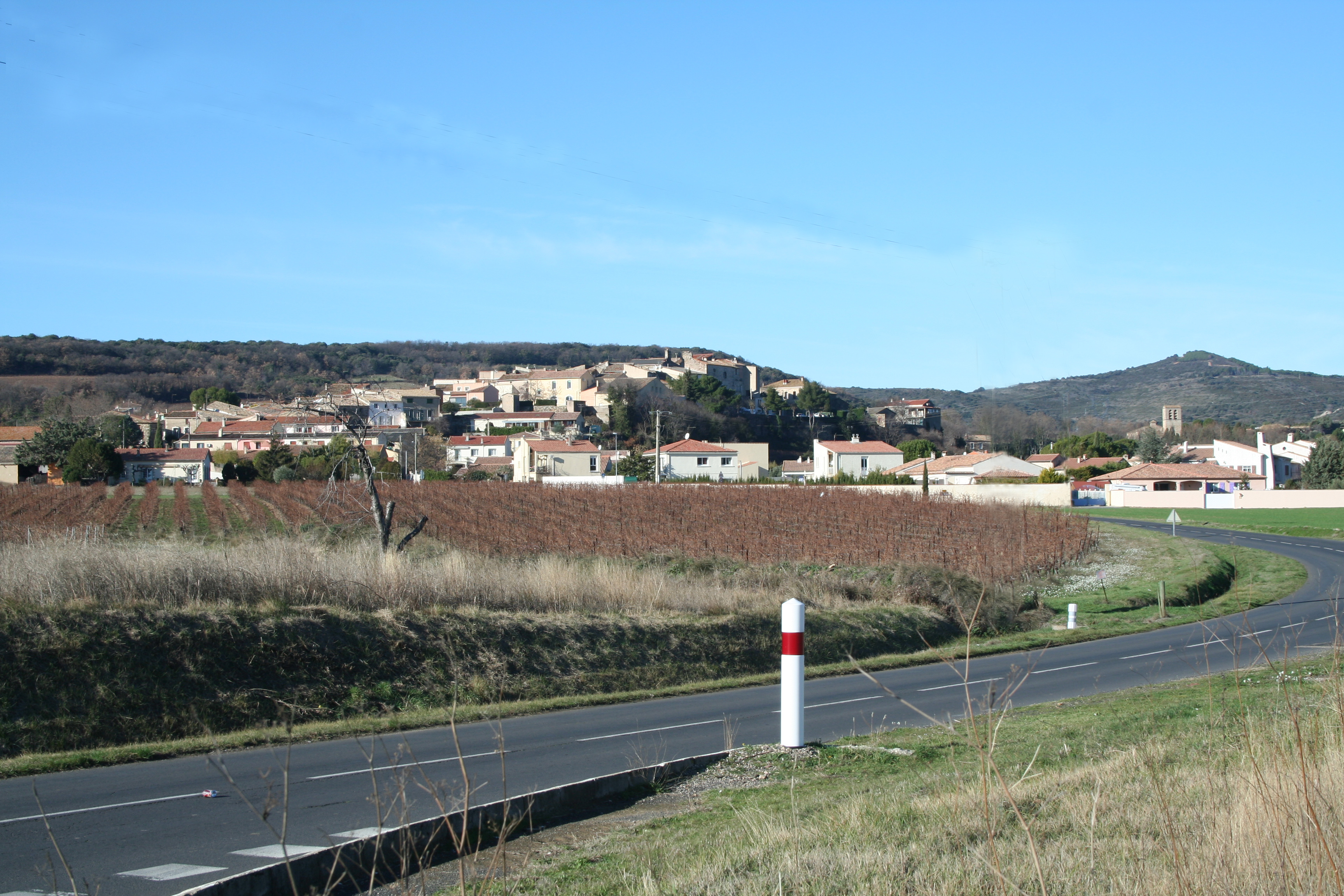
- A general view of Fontès

- Coat of arms
- Location of Fontès
- Location within France Location within Occitanie
- Coordinates: 43°32′27″N 3°22′48″E
- Country: France
- Region: Occitania
- Department: Hérault
- Arrondissement: Lodève
- Canton: Mèze
- Intercommunality: Clermontais

Government
  - Mayor (2020–2026): Olivier Brun
- Area^{1}: 17.7 km^{2} (6.8 sq mi)
- Elevation: 82 m (269 ft)
- Highest elevation: 235 m (771 ft)
- Lowest elevation: 38 m (125 ft)
- Population (2023): 1,060
  - Density: 59.9/km^{2} (155/sq mi)
- Time zone: UTC+01:00 (CET)
  - Summer (DST): UTC+02:00 (CEST)
- INSEE/Postal code: 34103 /34320
- ^{1} French Land Register data, which excludes lakes, ponds, glaciers > 1 km^{2} (0.386 sq mi or 247 acres) and river estuaries.

Fontès (French pronunciation: [fɔ̃tɛs]; Languedocien: Fontés) is a commune in the Hérault department in southern France.

== Population ==
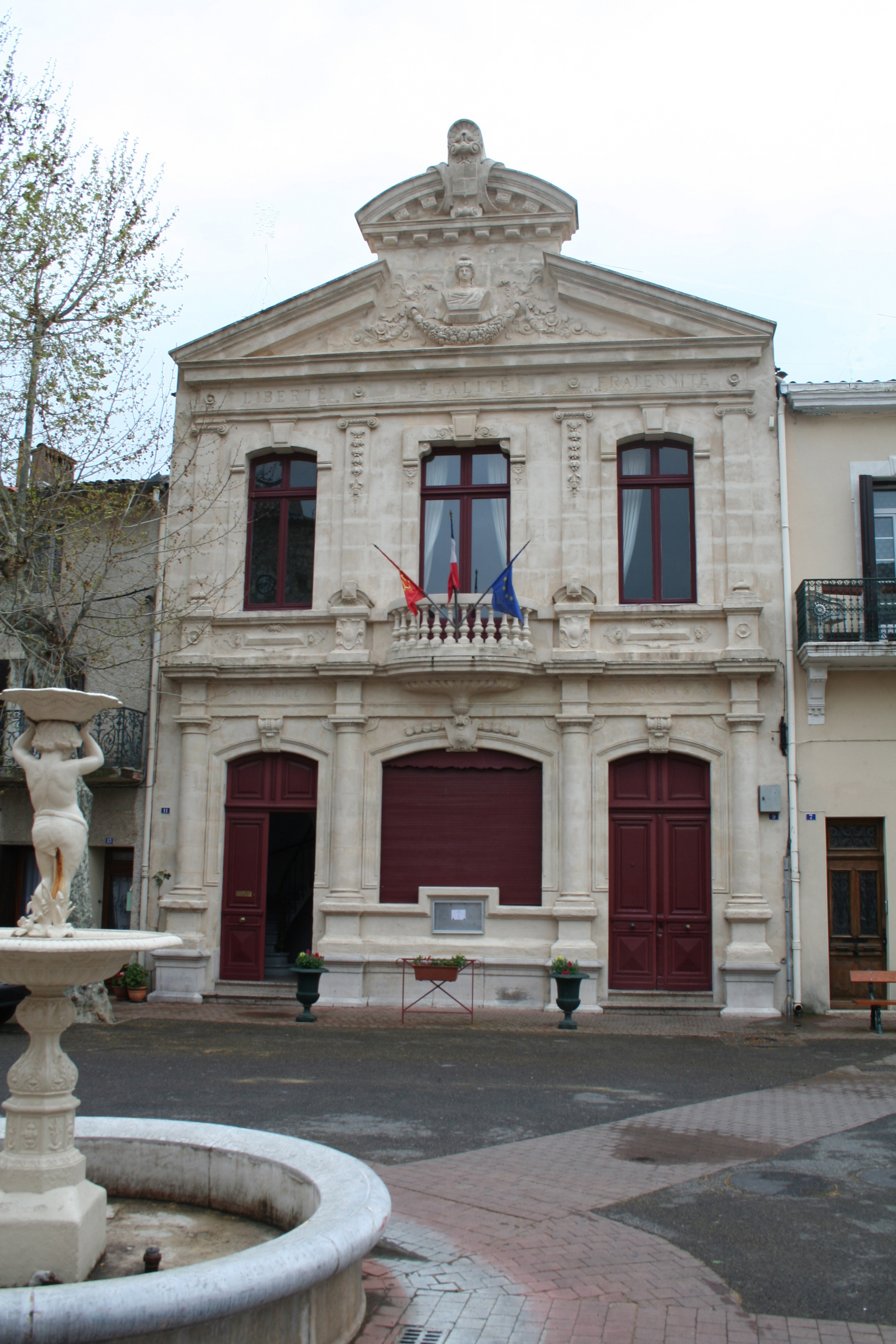
Town Hall

Historical population
Year	Pop.	±% p.a.
1968	802	—
1975	726	−1.41%
1982	750	+0.47%
1990	797	+0.76%
1999	788	−0.13%
2007	903	+1.72%
2012	941	+0.83%
2017	1,015	+1.53%
2023	1,060	+0.73%
Source: INSEE

== See also ==
- Communes of the Hérault department
