= Cazouls-d'Hérault =

- Commune
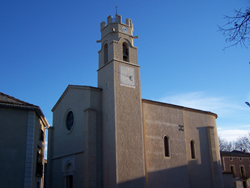
- The church of Cazouls-d'Hérault

- Coat of arms
- Location of Cazouls-d'Hérault
- Location within France Location within Occitanie
- Coordinates: 43°30′26″N 3°27′29″E
- Country: France
- Region: Occitania
- Department: Hérault
- Arrondissement: Béziers
- Canton: Mèze
- Intercommunality: CA Hérault Méditerranée

Government
  - Mayor (2020–2026): Henry Sanchez
- Area^{1}: 4.39 km^{2} (1.69 sq mi)
- Highest elevation: 31 m (102 ft)
- Lowest elevation: 9 m (30 ft)
- Population (2023): 420
  - Density: 96/km^{2} (250/sq mi)
- Time zone: UTC+01:00 (CET)
  - Summer (DST): UTC+02:00 (CEST)
- INSEE/Postal code: 34068 /34120
- ^{1} French Land Register data, which excludes lakes, ponds, glaciers > 1 km^{2} (0.386 sq mi or 247 acres) and river estuaries.

Cazouls-d'Hérault (French pronunciation: [kazul deʁo]; Occitan: Càsols d'Erau) is a commune in the Hérault department in southern France.

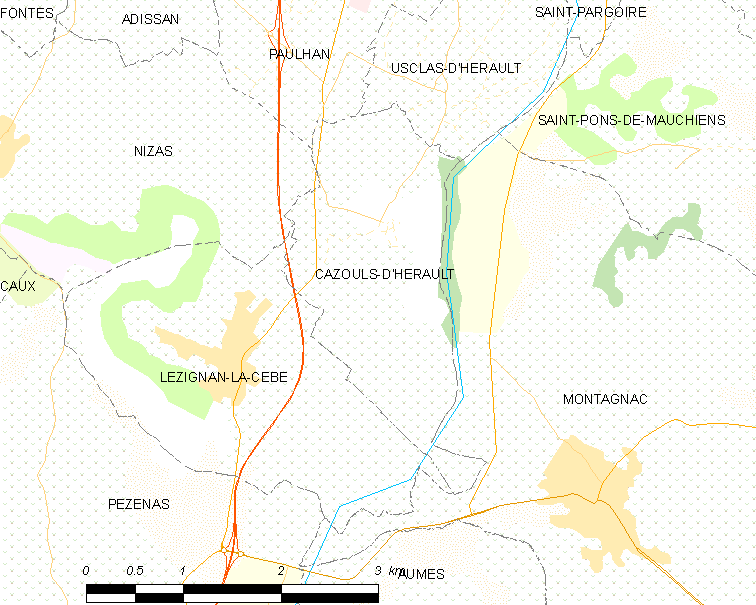
Map

== Population ==
Historical population
Year	Pop.	±% p.a.
1968	315	—
1975	330	+0.67%
1982	302	−1.26%
1990	283	−0.81%
1999	272	−0.44%
2007	307	+1.52%
2012	372	+3.92%
2017	406	+1.76%
2023	420	+0.57%
Source: INSEE

== Twin towns – sister cities ==
Cazouls-d'Hérault is twinned with:

- Monale, Italy (2010)

== See also ==
- Communes of the Hérault department
