= Saint-Pons-de-Mauchiens =

- Commune
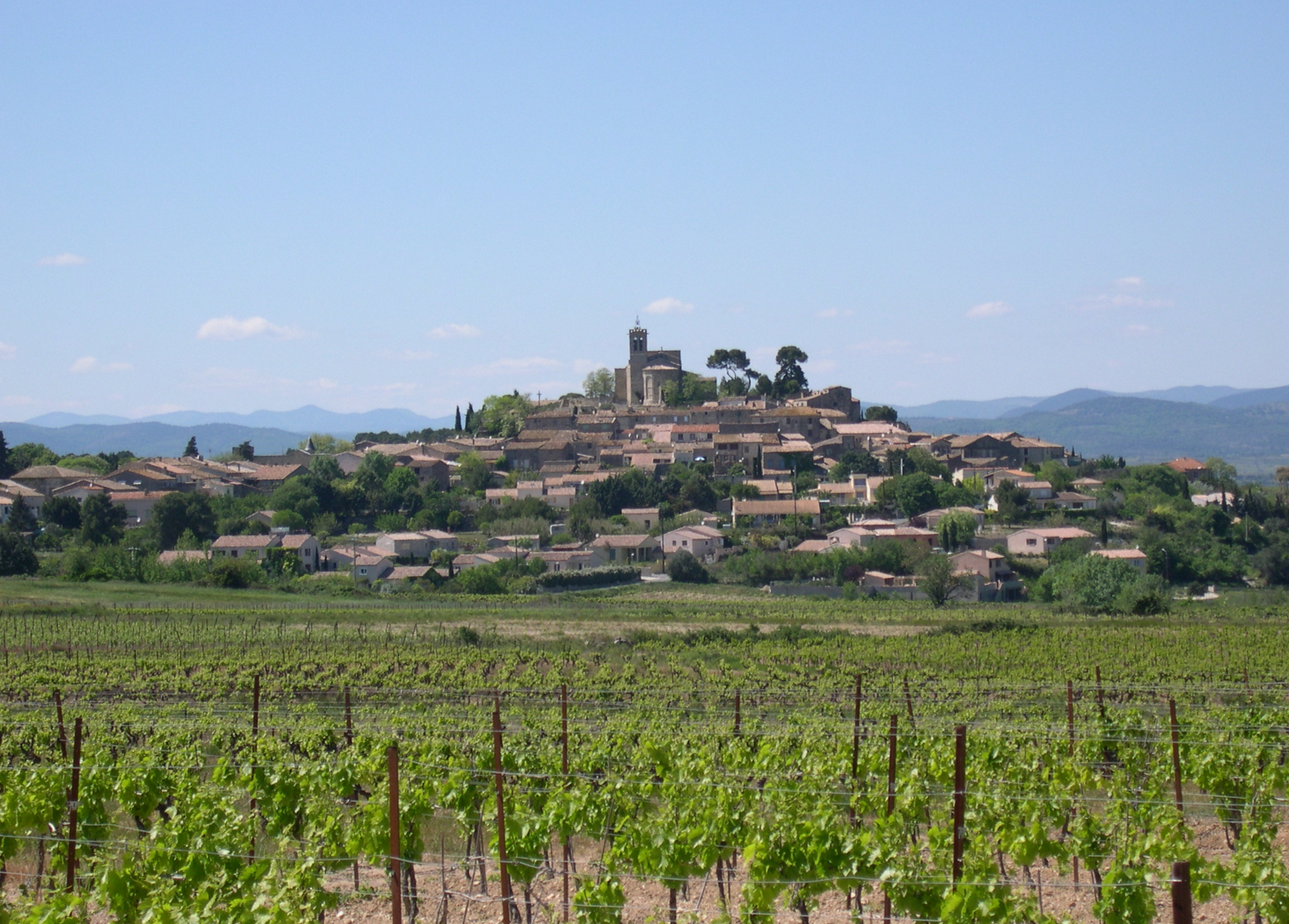
- A general view of Saint-Pons-de-Mauchiens

- Coat of arms
- Location of Saint-Pons-de-Mauchiens
- Location within France Location within Occitanie
- Coordinates: 43°30′51″N 3°30′53″E
- Country: France
- Region: Occitania
- Department: Hérault
- Arrondissement: Béziers
- Canton: Mèze
- Intercommunality: CA Hérault Méditerranée

Government
  - Mayor (2020–2026): Christine Pradel
- Area^{1}: 13.58 km^{2} (5.24 sq mi)
- Elevation: 100 m (330 ft)
- Highest elevation: 185 m (607 ft)
- Lowest elevation: 18 m (59 ft)
- Population (2023): 667
  - Density: 49.1/km^{2} (127/sq mi)
- Time zone: UTC+01:00 (CET)
  - Summer (DST): UTC+02:00 (CEST)
- INSEE/Postal code: 34285 /34230
- ^{1} French Land Register data, which excludes lakes, ponds, glaciers > 1 km^{2} (0.386 sq mi or 247 acres) and river estuaries.

Saint-Pons-de-Mauchiens (French pronunciation: [sɛ̃ pɔ̃s də moʃjɛ̃]; Occitan: Sant Ponç de Mauchins) is a commune in the Hérault department in the Occitanie region in southern France.

== Geography ==
A tiny village perched on a hill, St. Pons de Mauchiens is an example of the circulade type of village dating back to the eleventh and twelfth centuries. The Bishops of Agde built the city castle in 1199. A fine mill, the "Moulin de Roquemengarde" on the river Hérault is only 4 km away. A restored footpath (17 km) leads from the village environs into the hilly garrigue countryside, perfumed with thyme, lavender and rosemary.

== History ==
There is a legend about the village's name; One of the castle's lords owned a pack of ferocious dogs ("chiens" in French) that he let loose at nightfall. One day, he arrived home late and the castle doors were locked. The dogs did not recognize their master, savagely attacking his throat, tearing him to pieces. His last words were "Mauvais chiens !" The village is called St-Pons-de-MAUCHIENS, mauchiens being an abbreviation of 'Mauvais chiens'.

== Population ==
Historical population
Year	Pop.	±% p.a.
1968	511	—
1975	416	−2.90%
1982	411	−0.17%
1990	399	−0.37%
1999	513	+2.83%
2007	600	+1.98%
2012	662	+1.99%
2017	659	−0.09%
2023	667	+0.20%
Source: INSEE

== Sport ==
Saint-Pons-de-Mauchiens had Hérault's only cricket club, allowing league and friendly play against visiting touring sides. The club also demonstrated and coached cricket in local village schools. They have since moved to nearby village, Roujan. The village does boast a Tamburello court, and team, a sport local to the Mediterranean

== Personalities ==
- Marie Sagnier, born 28 February 1898 in St-Pons-de-Mauchiens, died 1996. Righteous among the Nations for saving Jewish children in her then primary school at Murat (Cantal), Auvergne In French. The new school opened in the village in 2023, bears her name in her memory.

== See also ==
- Communes of the Hérault department
