= Frontignan =

Frontignan Frontignan la Peyrade
- Commune
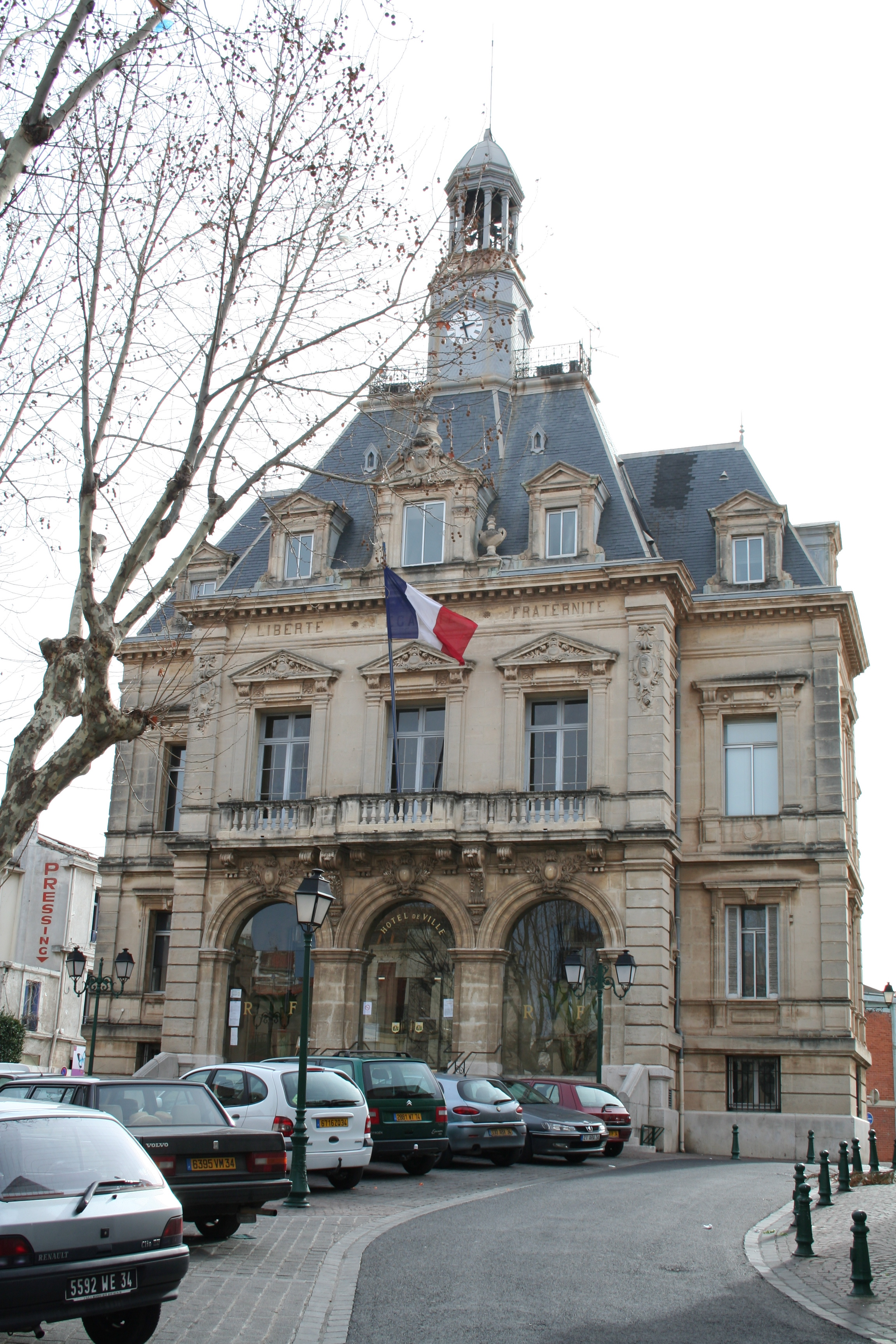
- The Hôtel de Ville

- Coat of arms
- Location of Frontignan
- Location within France Location within Occitanie
- Coordinates: 43°26′54″N 3°45′22″E
- Country: France
- Region: Occitania
- Department: Hérault
- Arrondissement: Montpellier
- Canton: Frontignan
- Intercommunality: CA Sète Agglopôle Méditerranée

Government
  - Mayor (2020–2026): Michel Arrouy (PS)
- Area^{1}: 31.72 km^{2} (12.25 sq mi)
- Elevation: 2 m (6.6 ft)
- Highest elevation: 223 m (732 ft)
- Lowest elevation: 0 m (0 ft)
- Population (2023): 24,136
  - Density: 760.9/km^{2} (1,971/sq mi)
- Time zone: UTC+01:00 (CET)
  - Summer (DST): UTC+02:00 (CEST)
- INSEE/Postal code: 34108 /34110
- ^{1} French Land Register data, which excludes lakes, ponds, glaciers > 1 km^{2} (0.386 sq mi or 247 acres) and river estuaries.

Frontignan (French pronunciation: [fʁɔ̃tiɲɑ̃]; Occitan: Frontinhan) is a commune in the Hérault department in southern France.

Frontignan is renowned for its AOC wine, the Muscat de Frontignan, a sweet wine made solely from the Muscat grape variety.

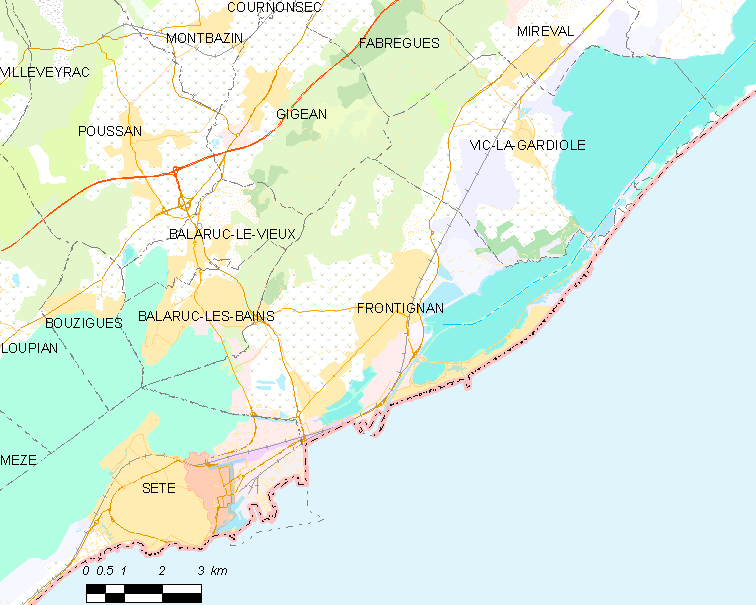
Map

== Geography ==
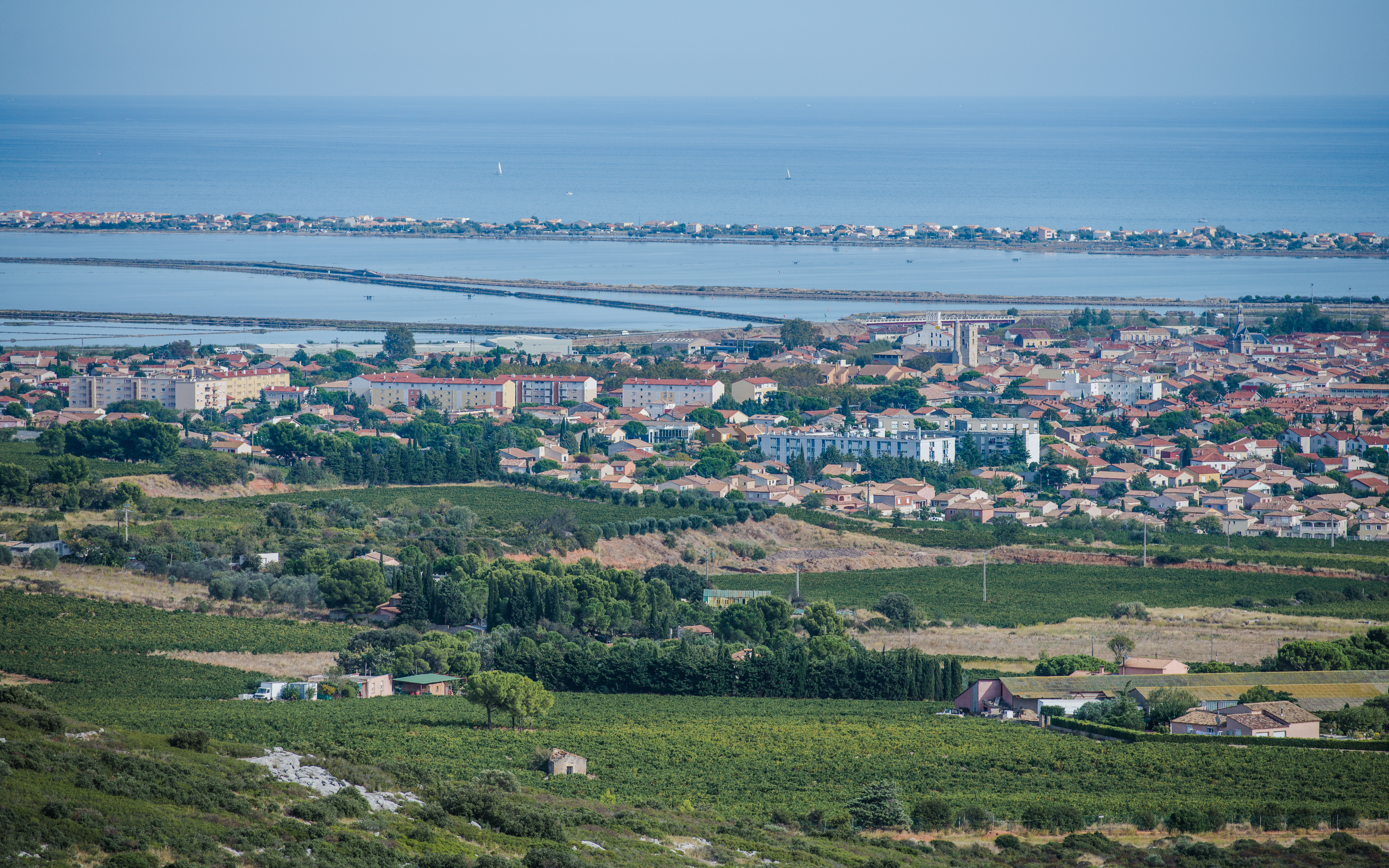
View from La Gardiole Mountain.

Frontignan is located in the Languedoc coastal plain between the towns of Sète and Montpellier.

The town is surrounded by the Gardiole hills to the north, the Ingril lagoon in the east, the Étang de Thau to the west and the Mediterranean shore (including the beach resort Frontignan-Plage) to the south.

The Rhône-Sète canal separates the inland town centre and Frontignan-Plage. Frontignan station has rail connections (TER Occitanie) to Narbonne, Montpellier and Avignon.

== History ==
- 1362 foundation of the fortress
- 1560 ransacked by the Protestants
- 16 June 1642: King Louis XIII and Cardinal Richelieu meet in Frontignan.
- 1787: Thomas Jefferson, future president of the United States, stays in Frontignan and reportedly enjoys the local Muscat de Frontignan wine.
- 1896: The Hôtel de Ville was completed.
- 28 June 1940: The car driven by Paul Reynaud hits a tree at La Peyrade, killing his mistress Helene de Portes. Reynaud is hospitalized, arrested on discharge, and imprisoned for the duration of the war.
- 25 June 1944: The Frontignan oil refineries and parts of the city (including the rail station) are bombed by the 15th USAAF causing some 40 civilian deaths.
- 12 August 1944: Battery Frontignan is attacked by the 465th BG in preparation of the invasion of Southern France on 15 August 1944.
- 31 December 2002: Frontignan together with the neighboring towns of Sète, Balaruc-les-Bains, Balaruc-le-Vieux, Vic-la-Gardiole, Mireval, Gigean and Marseillan joins the Communauté d'agglomération du Bassin de Thau (since 2017: Sète Agglopôle Méditerranée).

== Population ==
Historical population

Year	Pop.	±% p.a.
1793	1,100	—
1800	1,416	+3.67%
1806	1,398	−0.21%
1821	1,491	+0.43%
1831	1,877	+2.33%
1836	1,844	−0.35%
1841	1,966	+1.29%
1846	1,926	−0.41%
1851	2,129	+2.02%
1856	2,077	−0.49%
1861	2,574	+4.38%
1866	3,000	+3.11%
1872	3,225	+1.21%
1876	3,537	+2.34%
1881	3,164	−2.20%
1886	3,326	+1.00%
1891	3,603	+1.61%
1896	3,902	+1.61%
1901	4,470	+2.76%

Year	Pop.	±% p.a.
1906	4,668	+0.87%
1911	5,174	+2.08%
1921	5,283	+0.21%
1926	5,483	+0.75%
1931	5,859	+1.34%
1936	6,243	+1.28%
1946	6,096	−0.24%
1954	6,998	+1.74%
1962	8,309	+2.17%
1968	11,141	+5.01%
1975	12,238	+1.35%
1982	14,951	+2.90%
1990	16,245	+1.04%
1999	19,145	+1.84%
2007	23,068	+2.36%
2012	22,728	−0.30%
2017	22,762	+0.03%
2023	24,136	+0.98%

Source: EHESS and INSEE (1968-2023)

== Sights ==
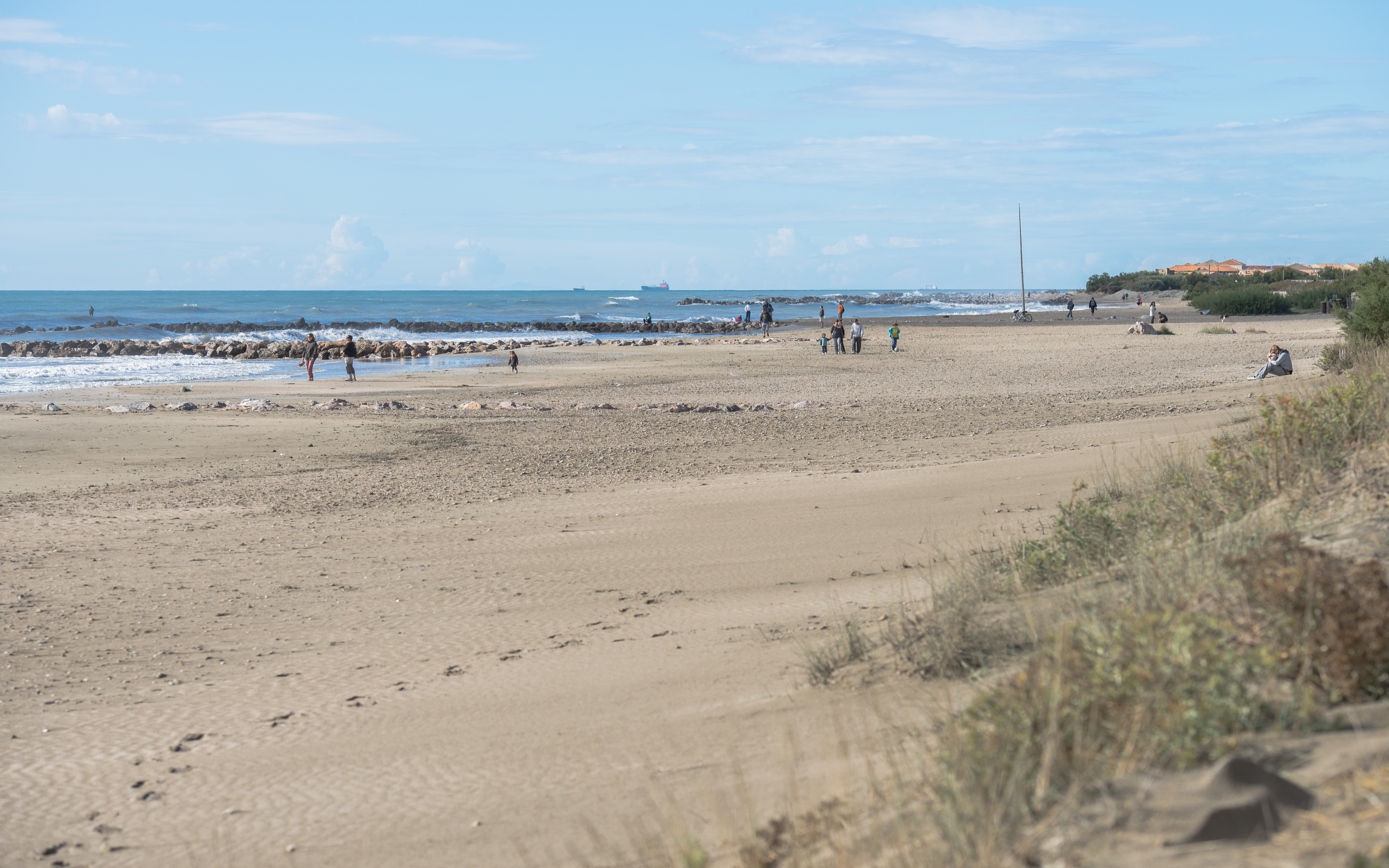
The beach at Frontignan-Plage.

- Old town centre with remains of the fortress dating back to the 14th century
- Saint Paul's Church (in parts 12th century)
- The Penitents' chapel (including the city's museum)
- Maison Population (early 20th century)
- Château Stony
- Château de la Peyrade
- La Peyrade bridge (17th century)
- Yacht port
- Natural reserve beaches
- Aresquiers natural reserve
- Argeliès caves

== Economy ==
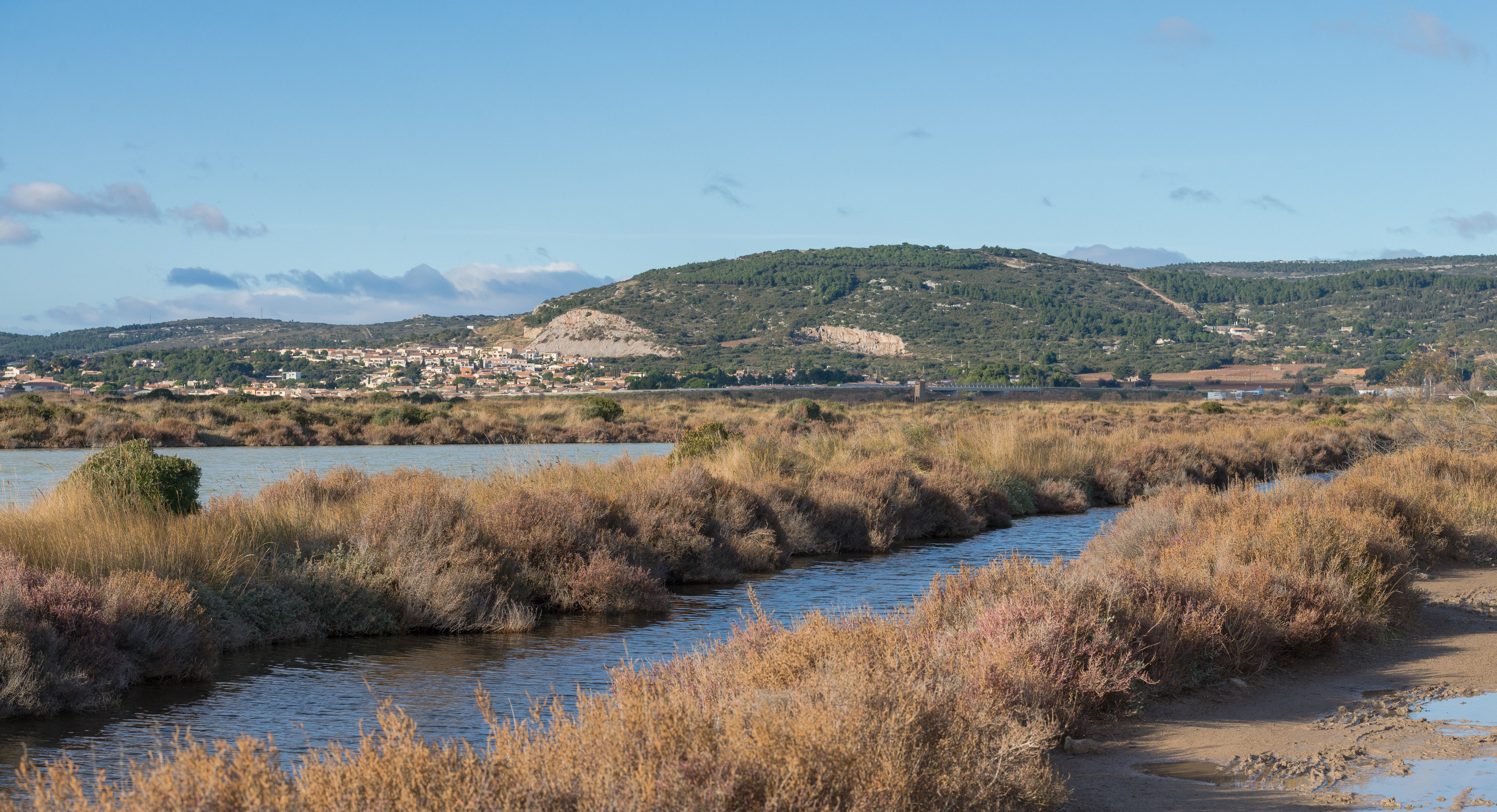
Les Crozets neighbourhood, seen from Les Salins

Until the early 20th century the local economy was based on the production of marine salt and wine. Later petro-chemical and chemical industries predominate with a steady decline in the 1980s. The oil refinery that opened in 1900 was converted to a simple depot in 1986.

Since the end of the 20th century, modern fisheries and high-tech plastics take over. Seasonal tourism is a dominant part of the local economy.

Important businesses in Frontignan include:

- Distrisud S.A.
- Indubois S.A.S.
- Hexis S.A.
- Barba S.A.S.
- Frontignan Coopérative S.C.A.
- Mobil Concepts s.à.r.l.

== Culture ==
- Frontignan is the hometown of the writer Maurice Clavel.
- Since 1998, Frontignan has organised the annual Festival International du Roman Noir, dedicated to noir fiction.
- Bullfighting and river jousting are the traditional sports.

== International relations ==
Frontignan is twinned with:

- Gaeta, Italy
- Vizela, Portugal
- Pineda de Mar, Spain
- M'Diq, Morocco

== See also ==
- Communes of the Hérault department
