= Gigean =

- Commune
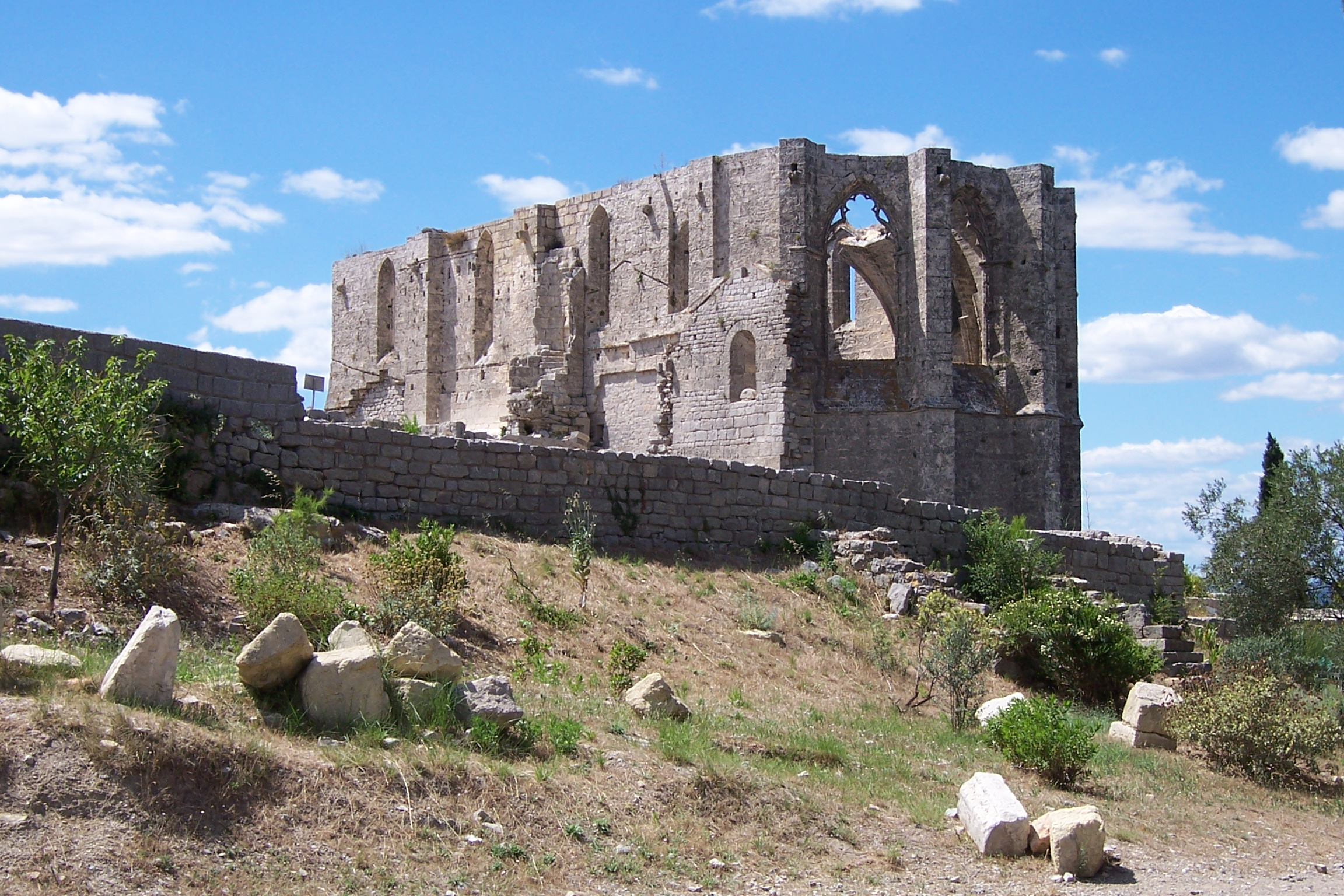
- Abbey St Félix de Montceau.

- Coat of arms
- Location of Gigean
- Location within France Location within Occitanie
- Coordinates: 43°30′01″N 3°42′42″E
- Country: France
- Region: Occitania
- Department: Hérault
- Arrondissement: Montpellier
- Canton: Frontignan
- Intercommunality: CA Sète Agglopôle Méditerranée

Government
  - Mayor (2020–2026): Marcel Stoecklin
- Area^{1}: 16.56 km^{2} (6.39 sq mi)
- Elevation: 44 m (144 ft)
- Highest elevation: 232 m (761 ft)
- Lowest elevation: 10 m (33 ft)
- Population (2023): 6,639
  - Density: 400.9/km^{2} (1,038/sq mi)
- Time zone: UTC+01:00 (CET)
  - Summer (DST): UTC+02:00 (CEST)
- INSEE/Postal code: 34113 /34770
- ^{1} French Land Register data, which excludes lakes, ponds, glaciers > 1 km^{2} (0.386 sq mi or 247 acres) and river estuaries.

Gigean (French pronunciation: [ʒiʒɑ̃]; Occitan: Gijan) is a commune in the Hérault département in Occitanie in southern France.

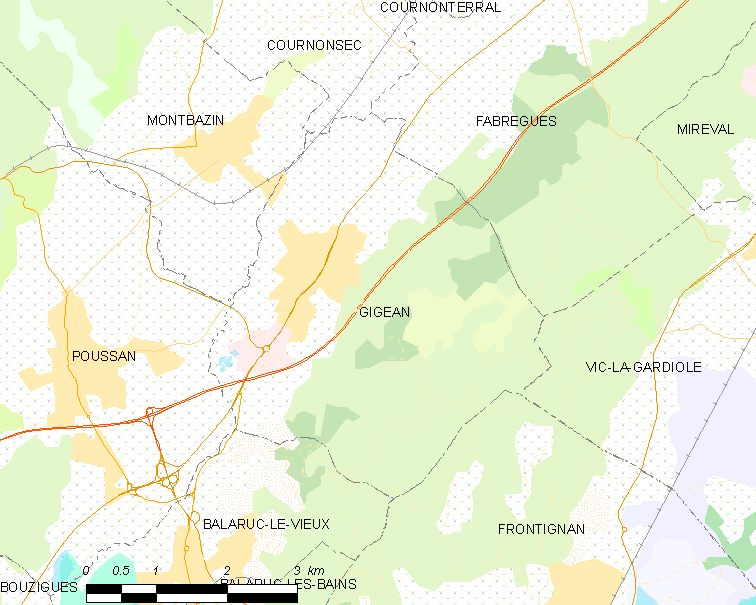
Map

== Geography ==
Gigean is bordered by the Étang de Thau to its west, the Gardiole hills to its south and by a wine growing plain, which runs from the Moure Hills to the edge of Montpellier.

Gigean is 18 km (11 mi) from Montpellier and 14 km (8.7 mi) from Sète.

The A9 autoroute exchange is 2 km (1.2 mi) south, which runs to the A75 33 km (21 mi) away at Clermont-l'Hérault.

The climate is Mediterranean: warm and dry in the summer, mild in the winter. Autumn is often marked by rain and heavy wind.

=== Neighboring communes ===
Poussan, Montbazin, Cournonsec, Fabrègues, Vic-la-Gardiole, Frontignan and Balaruc-le-Vieux.

== Population ==
Its inhabitants are called Gigeannais

Historical population
Year	Pop.	±% p.a.
1968	1,847	—
1975	2,135	+2.09%
1982	2,021	−0.78%
1990	2,529	+2.84%
1999	3,552	+3.85%
2007	5,186	+4.84%
2012	5,957	+2.81%
2017	6,426	+1.53%
2023	6,639	+0.54%
Source: INSEE

== Sights ==
- Saint Félix-de-Montceau: 13th century abbey, a listed monument historique since 1925, now in ruins, situated on the Gardiole hills.
- Église Saint Genis: 13th century church.

== See also ==
- Communes of the Hérault department
