= Hôtel de Ville, Frontignan =

Town hall in Frontignan, France

Hôtel de Ville
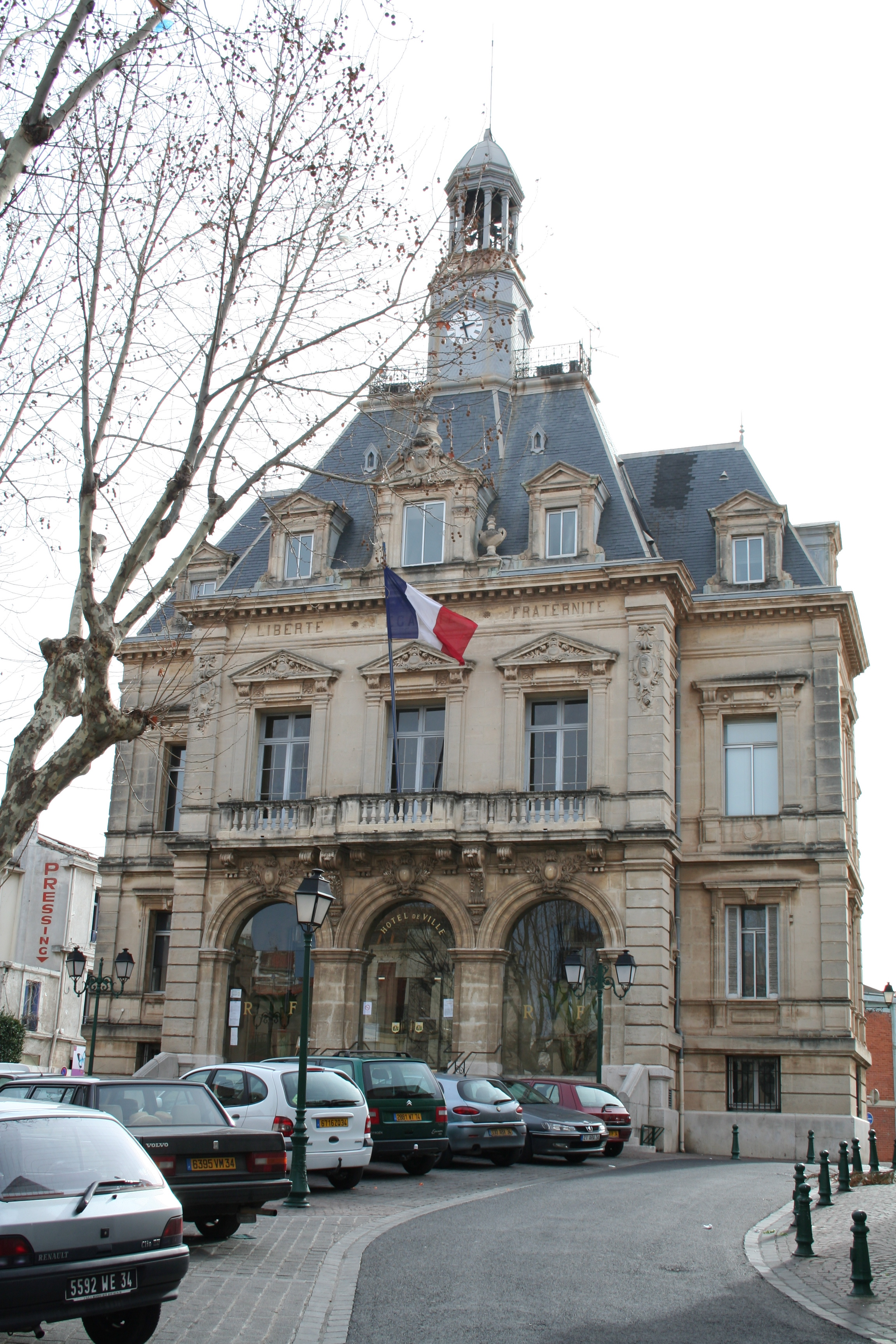
- The main frontage of the Hôtel de Ville in February 2007
- Interactive map of the Hôtel de Ville area

General information
- Type: City hall
- Architectural style: Neoclassical style
- Location: Frontignan, France
- Coordinates: 43.4456°N 3.7562°E
- Completed: 1896

Design and construction
- Architect: Dieudonné Deschanels

The Hôtel de Ville (French pronunciation: [otɛl də vil], City Hall) is a municipal building in Frontignan, Hérault, in southern France, standing on Place de l'Hôtel de Ville.

== History ==
The first municipal building in the town was the Maison de Ville which was commissioned under authority from Philip IV in the 14th century. It was located within the old ramparts of the Château de Roquefiche, close to the Church of Saint-Paul on what is now Rue du Député Lucien Salette. It was designed in the medieval style, built in stone and was completed in around 1345. Under the ancien régime, it served as the meeting place of the consuls and, following the French Revolution, it became the meeting place of the elected town council. In 1719, the travel writer, Jean-Aymar Piganiol de La Force, described it as the "most remarkable building in Frontignan". However, after the building became dilapidated, it was demolished in 1894.

In the late 19th century, following significant population growth, the council decided to commission a more substantial town hall. The site they selected had previously been occupied by the Château de Roquefiche itself and was located just 240 metres (790 ft) to the southeast of the old Maison de Ville. The site had already been acquired by the municipality for the purpose of building a new town hall in 1785. After the remains of the château had been cleared, the site was laid out with a new town square and surrounding streets. The foundation stone for the new building was laid by the mayor, François Simorre, on 21 April 1895. It was designed by Dieudonné Deschanels in the neoclassical style, built in ashlar stone at a cost of FFr260,000 and was completed in 1896.

The design involved a symmetrical main frontage of five bays facing onto the new town square. The central section of three bays, which was slightly projected forward, featured three round-headed openings with imposts, moulded surrounds and keystones. There were three French doors, flanked by pilasters supporting pediments and fronted by a balustraded balcony, on the first floor. The outer bays were fenestrated by casement windows flanked by pilasters supporting cornices, while the central section and the corners of the building were flanked by full-height pilasters supporting an entablature and a modillioned cornice. At roof level, there were three dormer windows and, behind them, a steep roof and an octagonal clock tower. Internally, the principal room was the Salle d'honneur (room of honour) which featured a fine chimney piece.

The novelist, Jules Verne, visited the town and commented on how beautiful the new building was when he saw it in 1895. On 4 September 1920, the building was lit up to celebrate the 50th anniversary of the Republic and the implementation of a system of public lighting in the town. Work was carried out to restore the stonework on the balcony after cracks began to appear in July 2013.
