= Canton of Frontignan =

Coordinates: 43°28′50″N 3°45′48″E

Frontignan
- Canton
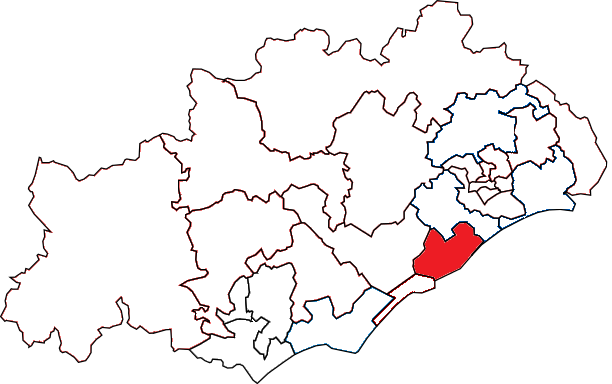
- Interactive map of Frontignan
- Country: France
- Region: Occitania
- Department: Hérault
- No. of communes: {{{nbcomm}}}

Government
  - Representatives (2021–2028): Jean-Franck Cappellini; Sylvie Pradelle
- Area: 92.40 km^{2} (35.68 sq mi)
- Population (2023): 47,380
  - Density: 512.8/km^{2} (1,328/sq mi)
- INSEE code: 34 08

The canton of Frontignan is an administrative division of the Hérault department, southern France.

== Municipalities ==
This Canton was revised in 2008, and again in 2015. Since the French canton reorganisation which came into effect in March 2015, the communes of the canton of Frontignan are:

- Balaruc-les-Bains
- Balaruc-le-Vieux
- Frontignan
- Gigean
- Mireval
- Vic-la-Gardiole

== Councillors ==
Election	Councillors	Party	Occupation
2015	Pierre Bouldoire	PS	Mayor of Frontignan
2015	Sylvie Pradelle	PS	Councillor of Gigean

== Pictures of the canton ==
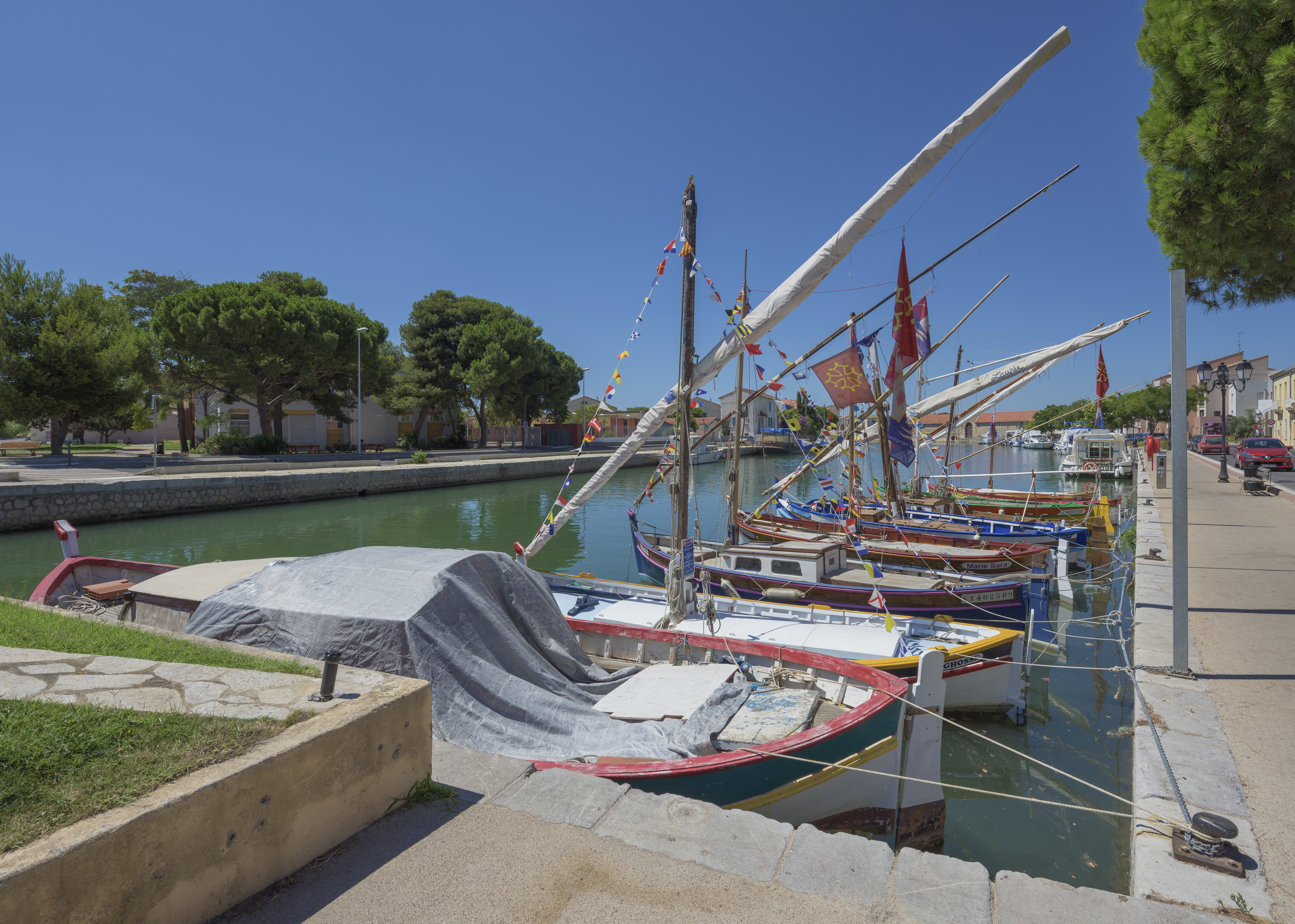
The Voltaire Embankment in Frontignan

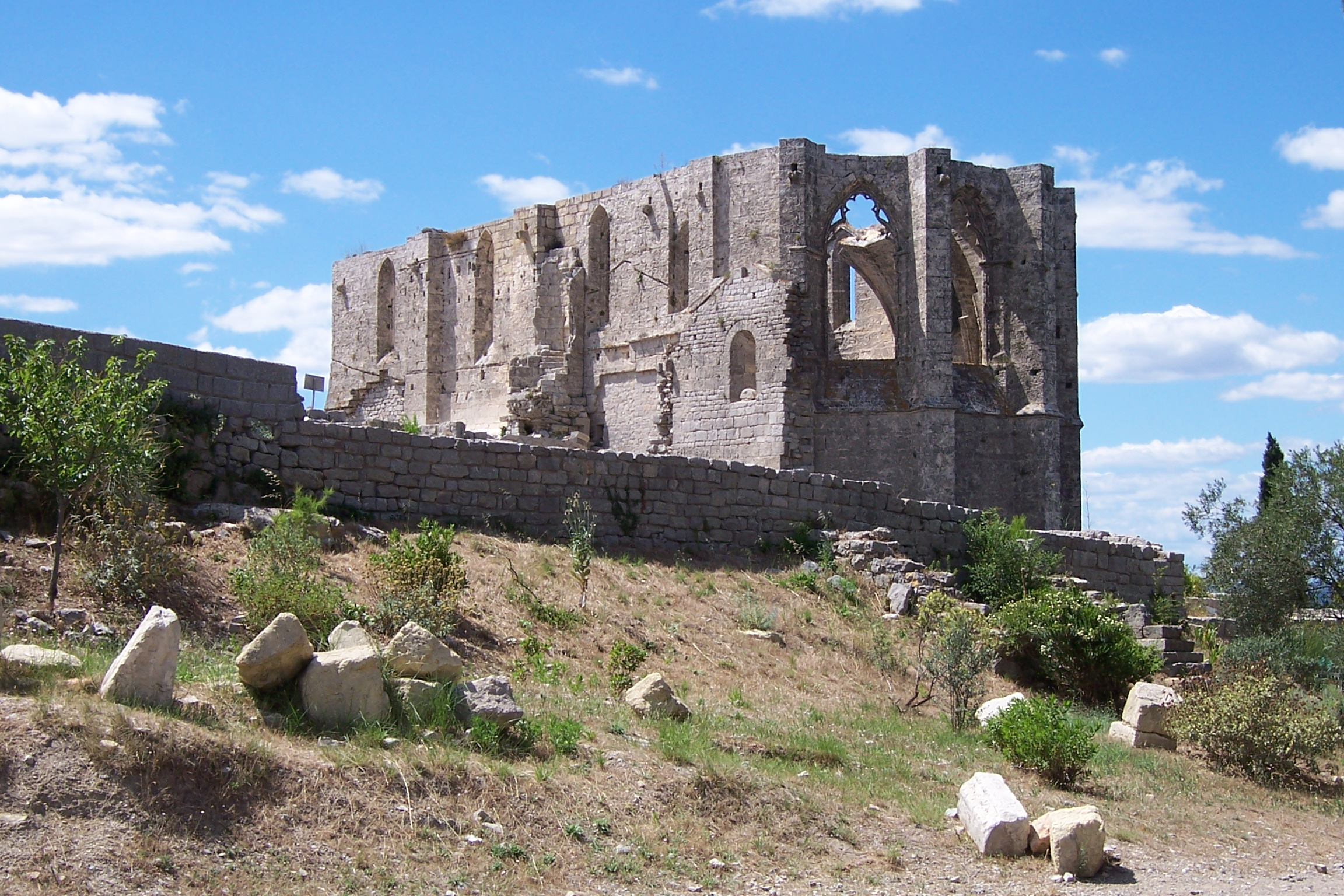
Saint-Félix-de-Montceau Abbey in Gigean

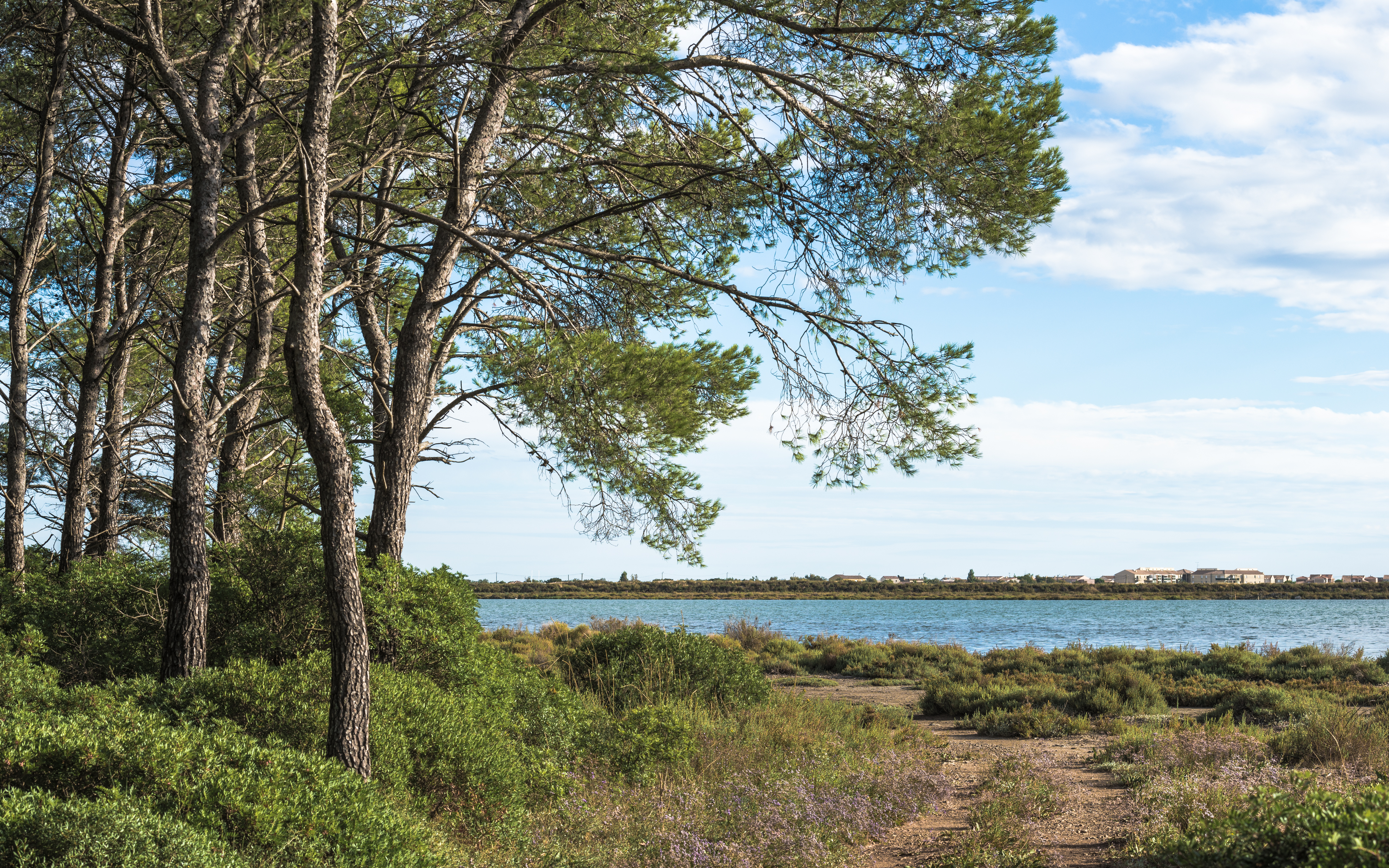
The Étang d'Ingril in Vic-la-Gardiole
