= Hexis S.A. =

French manufacturer of self-adhesive vinyl films

Hexis S.A.S
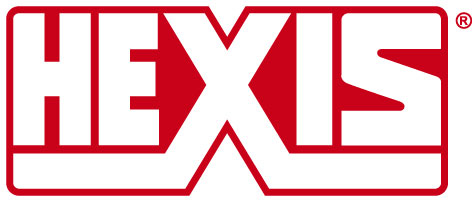
- Company type: Private Limited Company
- Industry: Manufacturing (plastics)
- Founded: 1989
- Headquarters: Frontignan, France
- Key people: Michel Mateu (managing director)
- Products: Pressure-sensitive adhesive coated films
- Revenue: EUR 63 million (2011)
- Number of employees: 250 (2011)
- Website: www.hexisgroup.com

Hexis S.A.S is a manufacturer of self-adhesive vinyl (PVC) films used for commercial signage and as digital printing media for large format inkjet printers. The company headquarters are in Frontignan, France. The company was founded in 1989 by its current (2010) president, Michel Mateu.

The company specializes in pressure-sensitive adhesive (PSA) coating of thin plastic films and pioneered their own process to produce cast vinyl films. In 2008 Hexis patented an anti-microbial film adhésif intended for the anti-microbial protection of surfaces

For its quality management system the company is ISO 9001-2000 certified.

In 2007 Hexis S.A.S received the Prix de l’Ambition jointly awarded by Banque Palatine, a French bank, the La Tribune financial newspaper and the HEC School of Management, recognizing the company's growth performance.

The same year Michel Mateu, President of Hexis S.A.S, received the 2007 Innovation Award for the Mediterranean region jointly awarded by Ernst & Young and the French business magazine L’Entreprise.

In the United Kingdom Hexis S.A.S is represented by its exclusive distributor Hexis UK Ltd. Based in Lichfield, Staffordshire, the UK company was founded in 1994 by its current (2017) managing director Scott Wilkins and its then managing director Philip Wilkins.

== Trademark ==
Hexis with the associated logo is a registered trademark which is licensed by Mark Holding Europe BV.

Hexis S.A.S has affiliated companies using the Hexis trademark under licence the Netherlands, Switzerland and the United Kingdom.

== Subsidiaries ==
- Hexis FWI, Baie-Mahault, Guadeloupe, France
- Hexis GmbH, Hilden, Germany
- Hexis Graphics España s.l., Barcelona, Spain
- Hexis Graphics Sverige, Landskrona, Sweden
- Hexis Italia s.r.l., Bologna, Italy
- Hexis USA LLC, Corona, California, USA
- Hexis Swiss, Birr, Swiss

== See also ==
- Hexis Racing
