= Étang de Thau =

Lake on the south coast of France

- Thau Lagoon
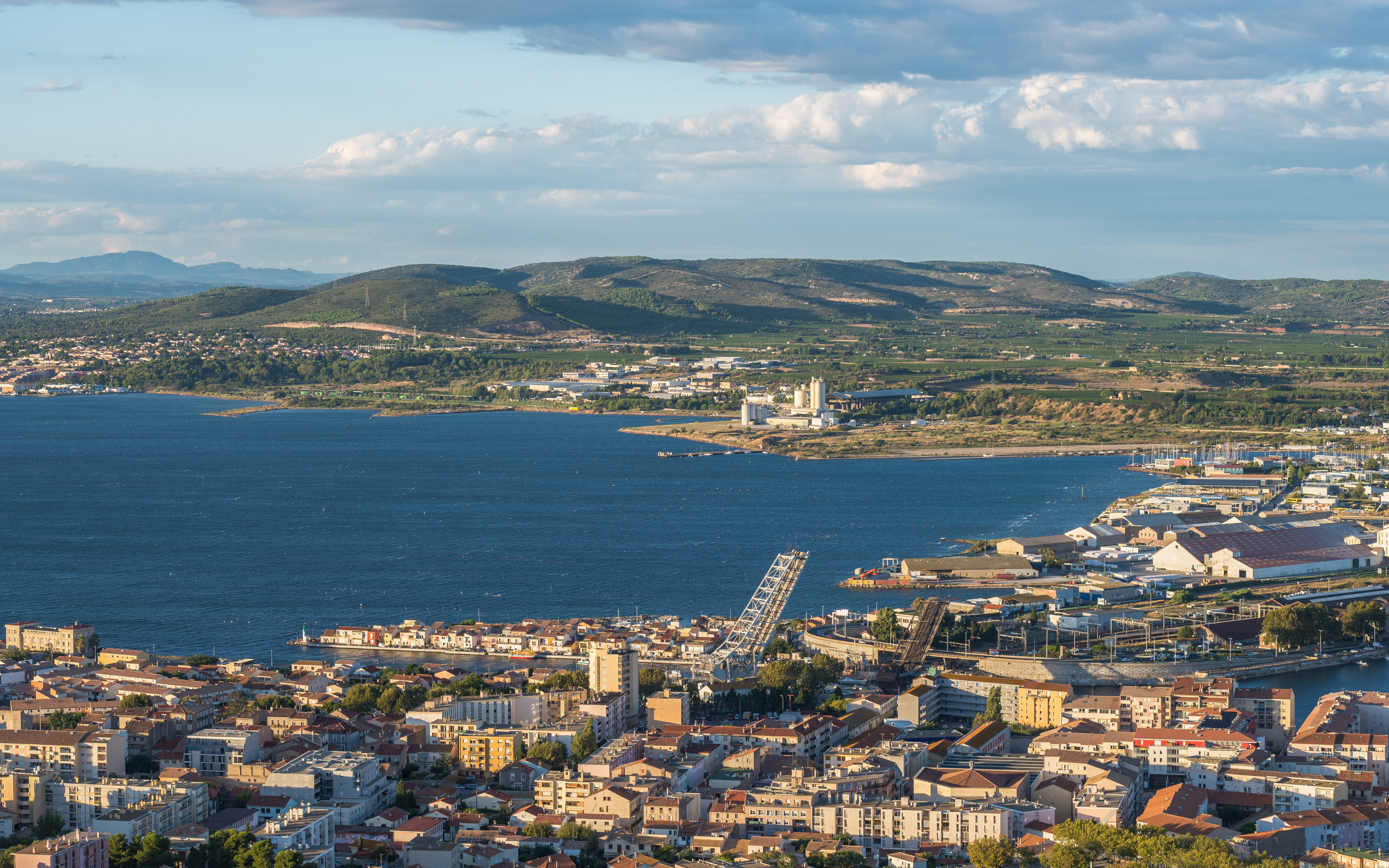
- View from Sète

- Location within France
- Location: Languedoc-Roussillon
- Coordinates: 43°24′36″N 3°37′27″E
- Type: lagoon
- Basin countries: France
- Max. length: 21 km (13 mi)
- Max. width: 8 km (5.0 mi)
- Surface area: 7,012 ha (17,330 acres)
- Average depth: 4 m (13 ft)
- Max. depth: 30 m (98 ft)
- Surface elevation: 0 m (0 ft)
- Settlements: Marseillan, Mèze, Bouzigues, Balaruc-les-Bains, Sète

The Étang de Thau (French pronunciation: [etɑ̃ də to]; Occitan: Estanh de Taur) or Bassin de Thau is the largest of a string of lagoons (étangs) that stretch along the French coast from the Rhône river to the foothills of the Pyrenees and the border to Spain in the Languedoc-Roussillon. Although it has a high salinity, it is considered the third largest lake in France.

== Description ==
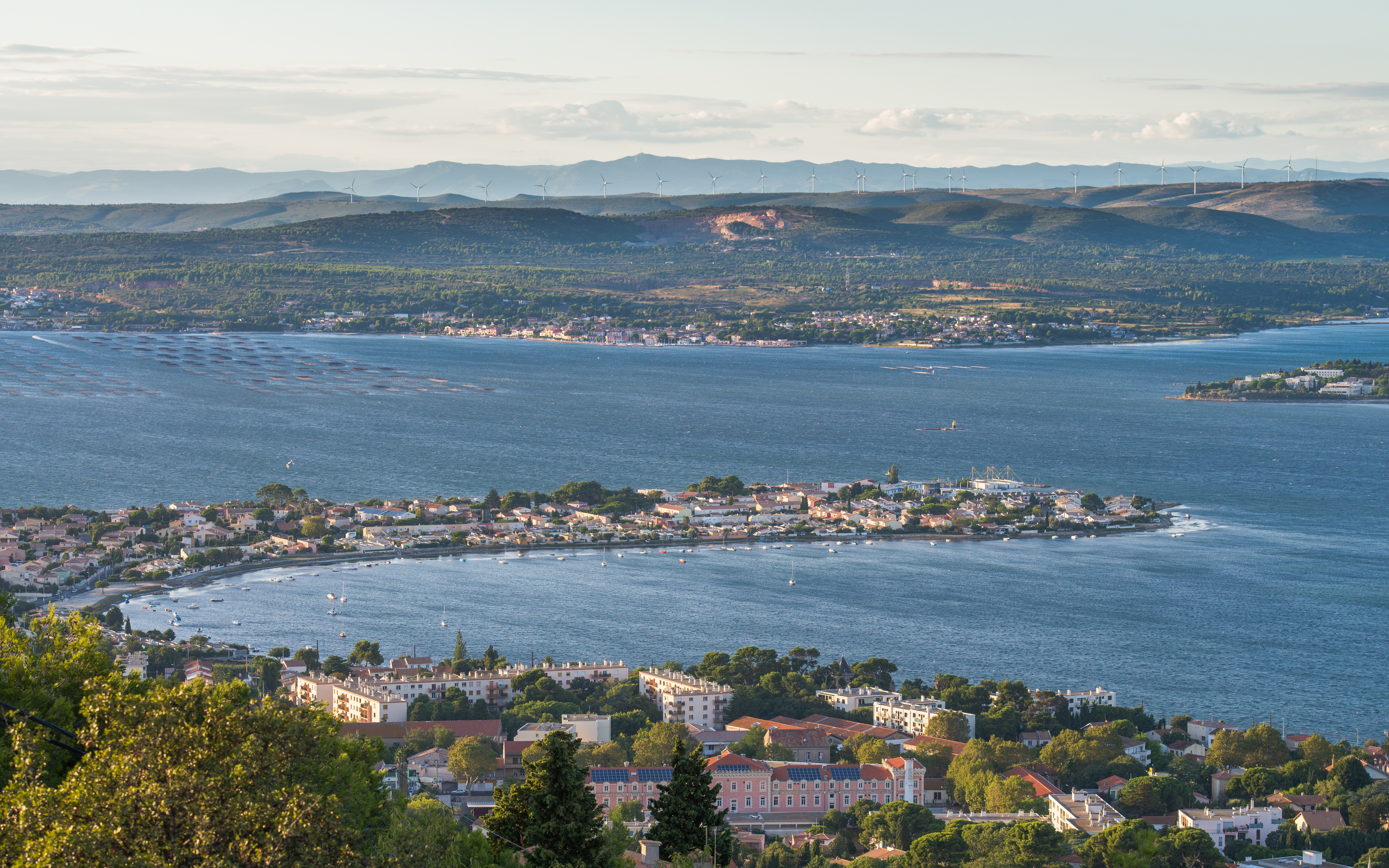
The Étang de Thau seen from Sète.

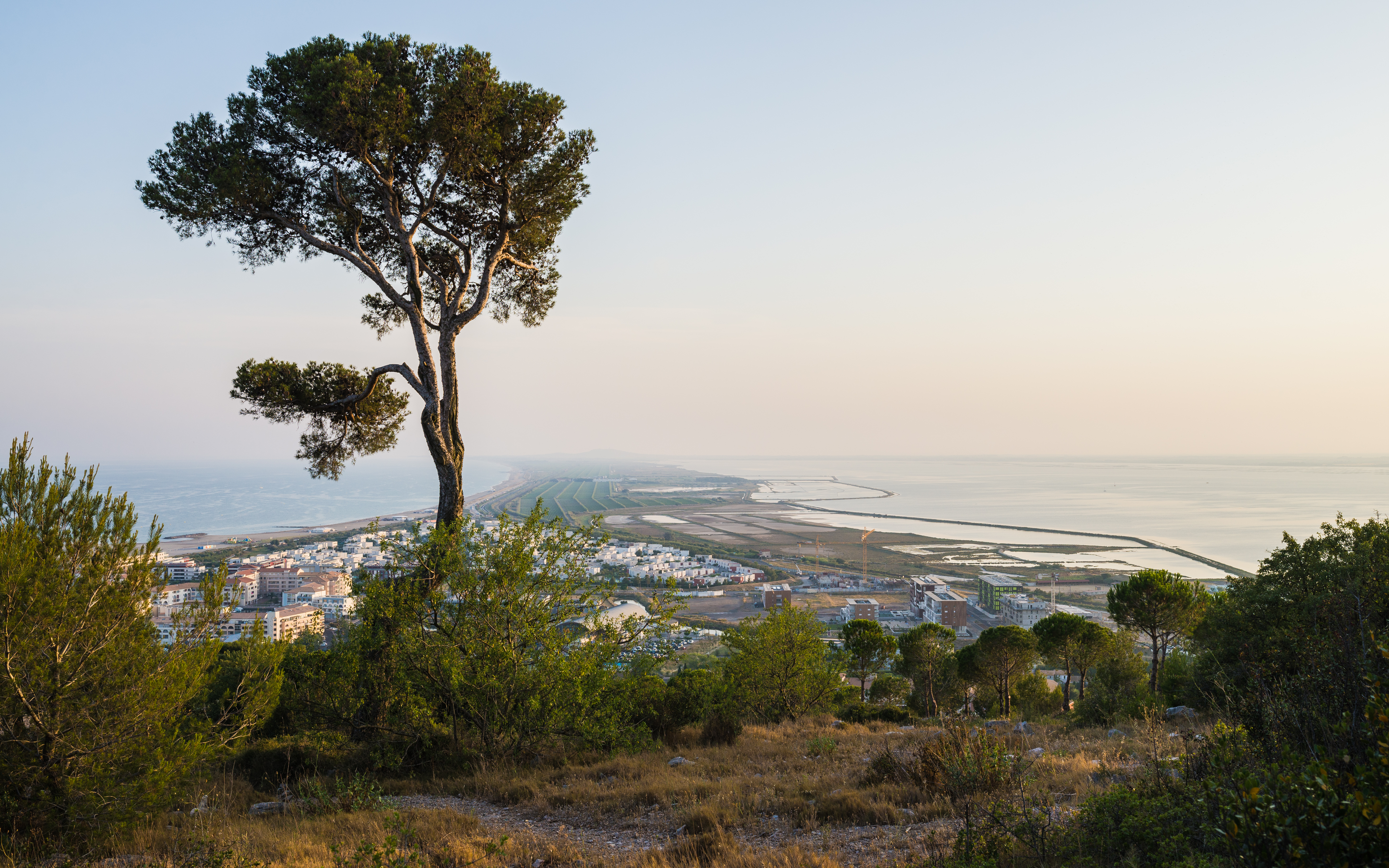
The coastline between Sète and Marseillan with the Étang de Thau on the right.

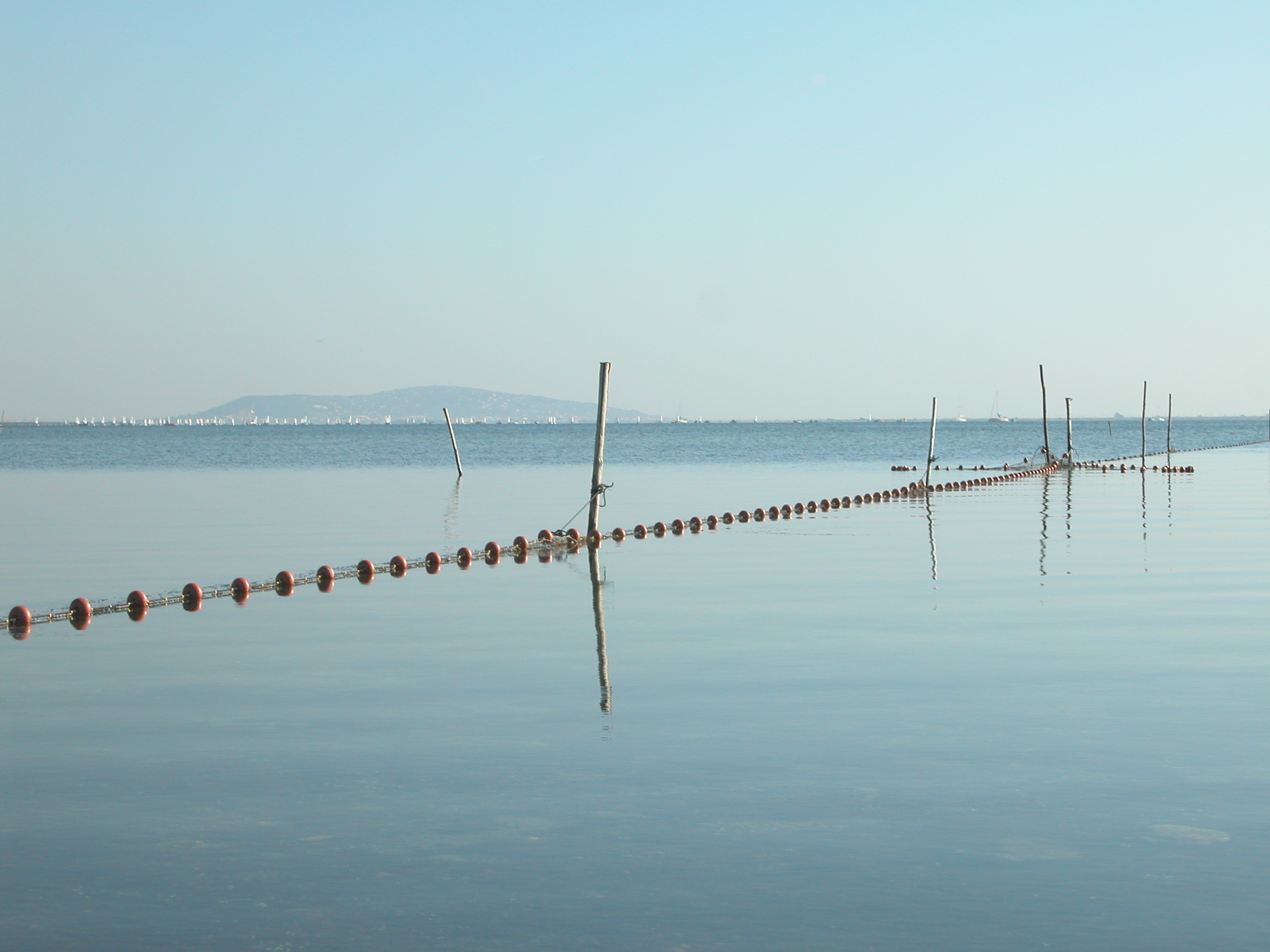
The Étang de Thau during a sailing regatta.

It is about 21 kilometres (13 mi) long and 8 km wide, with an area of 7,012 hectares (27.07 sq mi). The mean depth of the lagoon is 4.5 metres (15 ft), but in the central navigation channel it can be 10 metres (33 ft) deep. Near Bouzigues is a 30-metre-deep (98 ft) depression with a diameter of 100 metres (330 ft). This 'Fosse de la Vise' is the source of a hot spring that feeds the spa in Balaruc.

Its size and depth, which distinguish it from other lagoons of the region, is explained by the geomorphology of the region since the syncline formed by folding produced the corresponding anticline of the Gardiole in the north-east.

Until relatively recently, the lagoons from Marseillan to the Rhône were a continuous stretch of inland waterway. Early settlers described this feature as "une petite mer intérieure et tranquille" ("a small, calm, inland sea"). It provided access to, in particular, Marseillan, a fishing village that became a trade centre.

Linked now by the Canal du Rhône à Sète to the river Rhône and by the Canal du Midi to Bordeaux via Toulouse, the lagoon also has access to the Mediterranean at Sète. There is also a small canal (le canal des Allemands or the pisse-saume) that links the western end to the sea at Marseillan Plage. This canal is only suitable for small craft since both road and railway bridges restrict height.

To the east, between Balaruc and Sète, the borders of the lagoon are largely industrial. The south bank is formed by the coastal strip from Sète to Cap d'Agde. The northern side has villages dedicated to fishing and the production of shellfish. There are harbours in the towns of Marseillan, Mèze and Bouzigues, with smaller ports dedicated to shellfish on the northern shore.

There is significant variation in the rainfall in the catchment basin for the lagoon, both seasonally and between years. The annual precipitation can range from 200 to 1,000 mm per year. As a result, the water temperature and salinity have extensive ranges. Water temperature ranges from 3 °C to 29 °C, with salinities of 27 to 40 psu. The salinity changes during the year with lows from February to June and peaks in July to January.

== Administration ==
Located between the towns of Sète and Marseillan in the Hérault département, the Étang de Thau is shared administratively by the communes of (running clockwise), Balaruc-le-Vieux, Balaruc-les-Bains, Frontignan, Sète, Marseillan, Mèze, Loupian and Bouzigues.

== Economy and natural resources ==
As the lagoon is open to the sea, it has fish such as the gilt-head bream (dorade), the meagre (maigre, a kind of croaker) and the sea bass. The lagoon produces approximately 200 kg/ha/year of fish. However, the shellfish industry is more economically important. Eighteen varieties of shellfish are taken from the lagoon - the most important being oysters. 750 producers farm 2,750 oyster tables and take some 13,000 tonnes annually. This provides for about 8.5% of France's consumption. Oysters from the Étang de Thau are marketed under the name huîtres de Bouzigues (Bouzigues oysters) after the village of Bouzigues where oyster production started. They are a cupped variety. Fixed with cement to ropes, the young oysters are immersed in the water until they reach a size suitable for consumption. Thau water is graded A and so shellfish can be caught and consumed within minutes. In addition to oysters, some 3,000 tonnes of mussels are produced every year.

Apart from fishing and shellfish, the Étang de Thau provides income through tourism, particularly via sailing schools.

== Wildlife ==
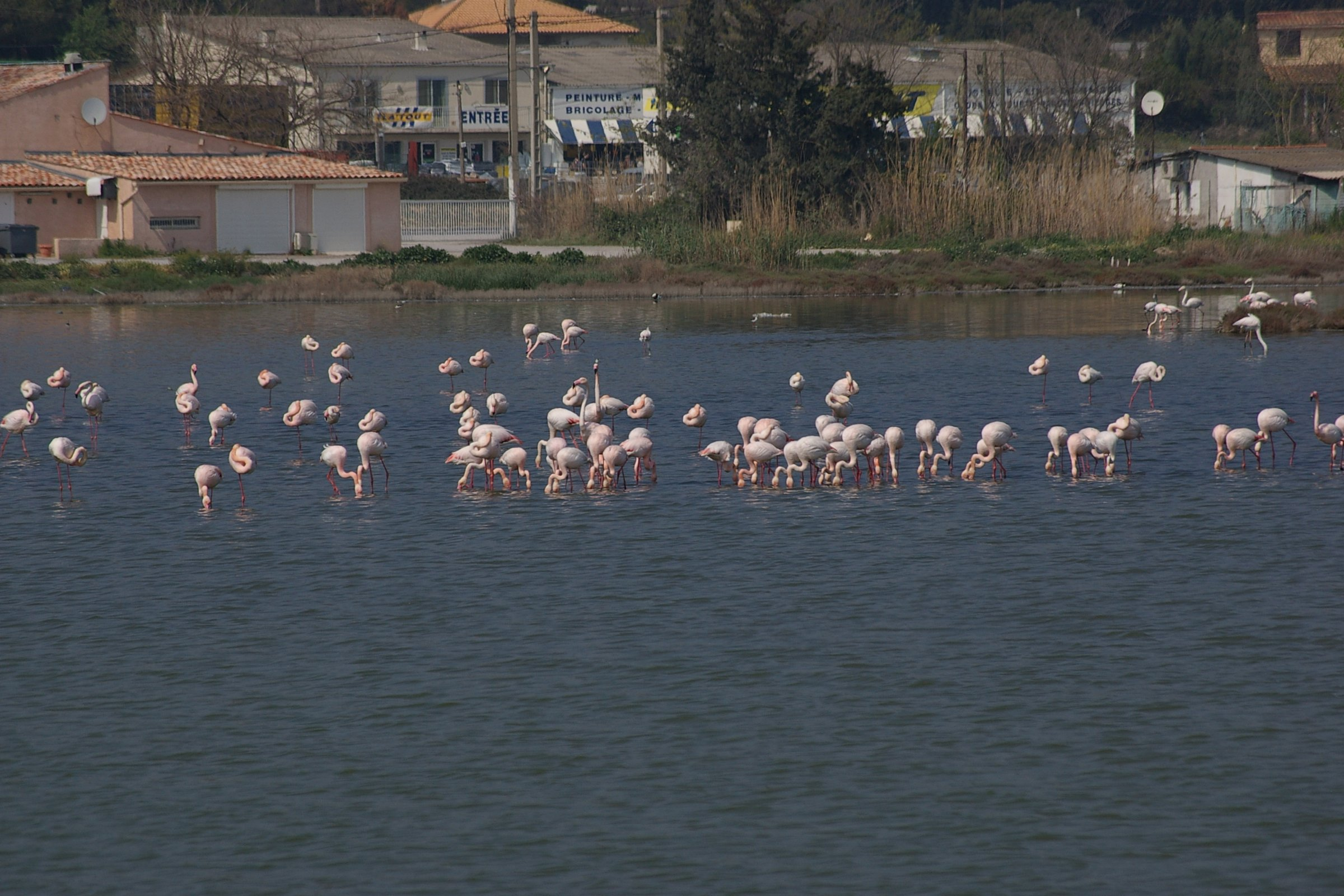
Flamingos near Bouzigues

The Bassin de Thau provides a habitat for a variety of wild animals, notably birds such as herons and pink flamingos and a rich marine fauna, including bivalves (oysters and mussels), jellyfish, fish, and algae. Periodically in the spring and summer, the Thau Lagoon has algae blooms of Alexandrium catenella which sometimes reach such high levels that it results in contamination of the lagoon's bivalves with algal toxins.

== Gallery ==
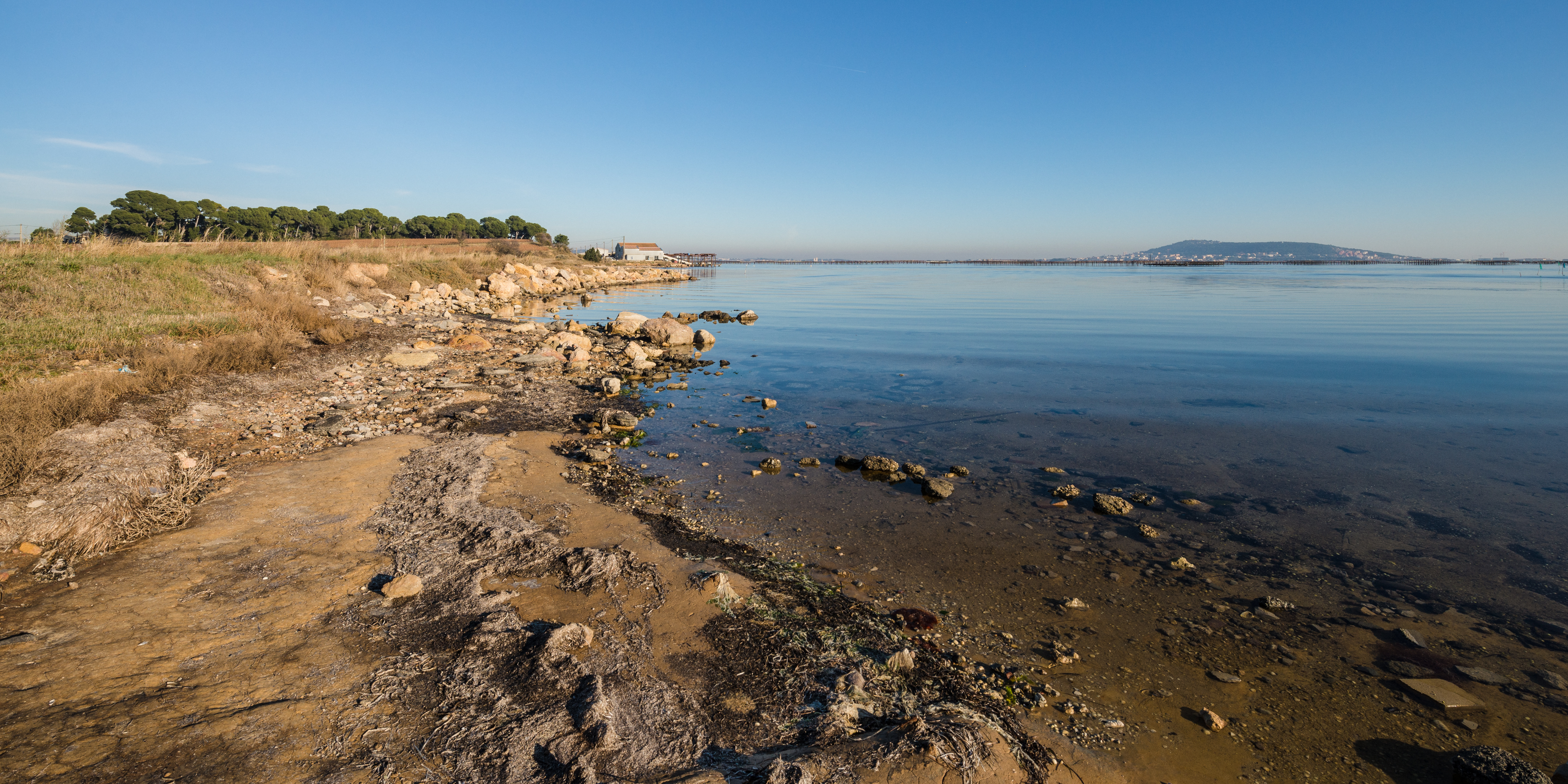
Étang de Thau and Sète from Mèze

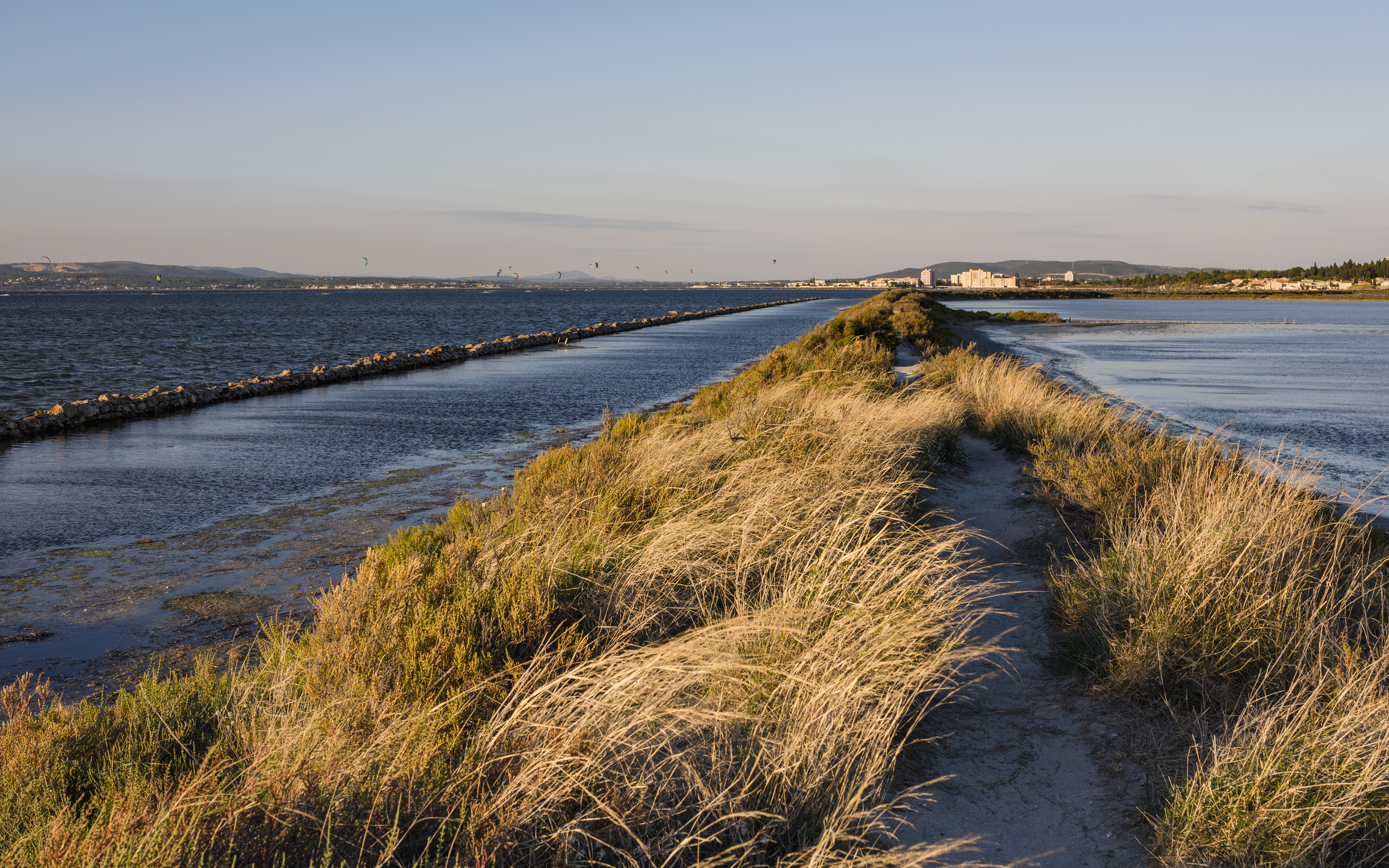
Lido de Thau with the Étang de Thau on the left, former salt evaporation ponds on the right

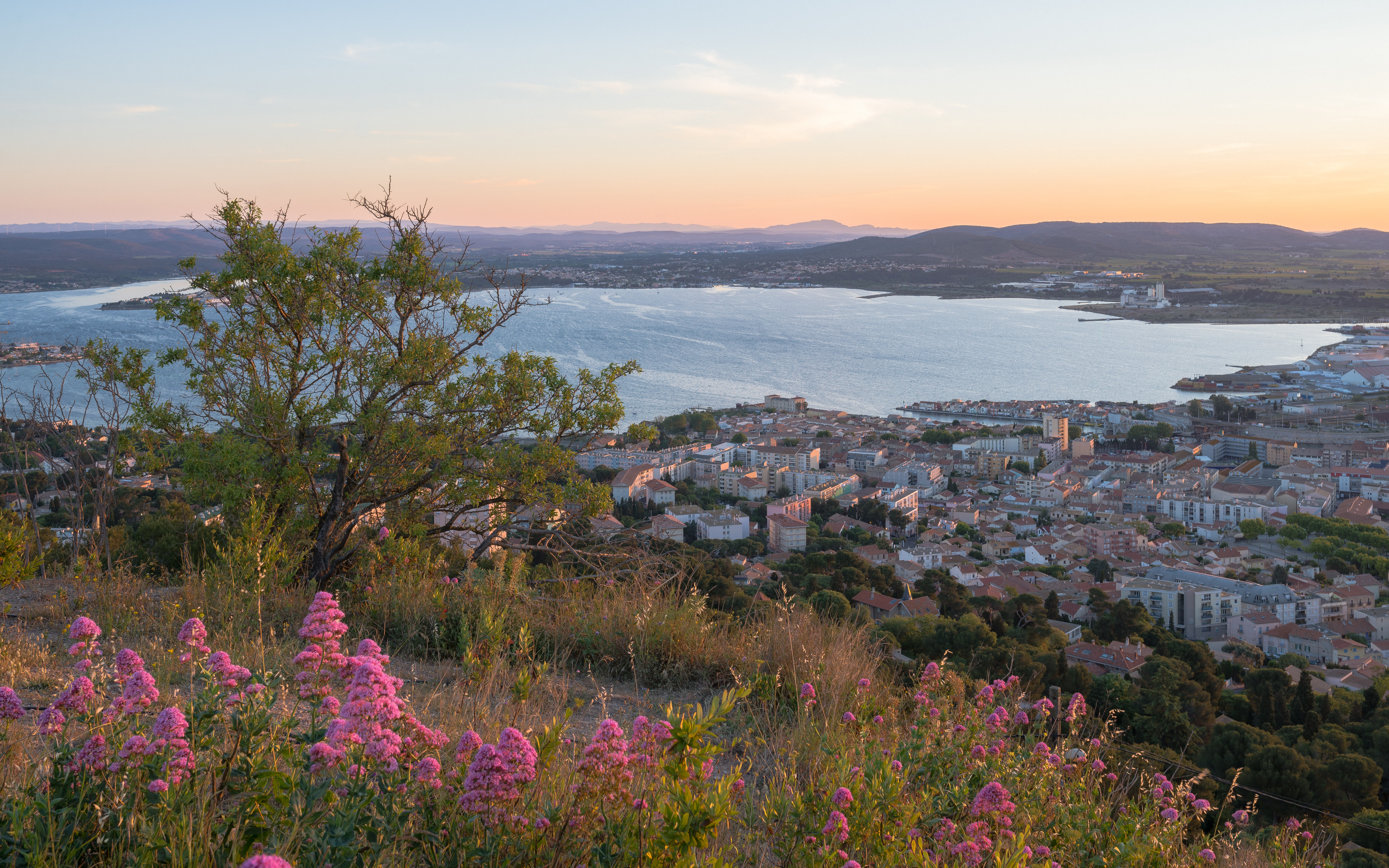
Sète and the Étang de Thau at dawn

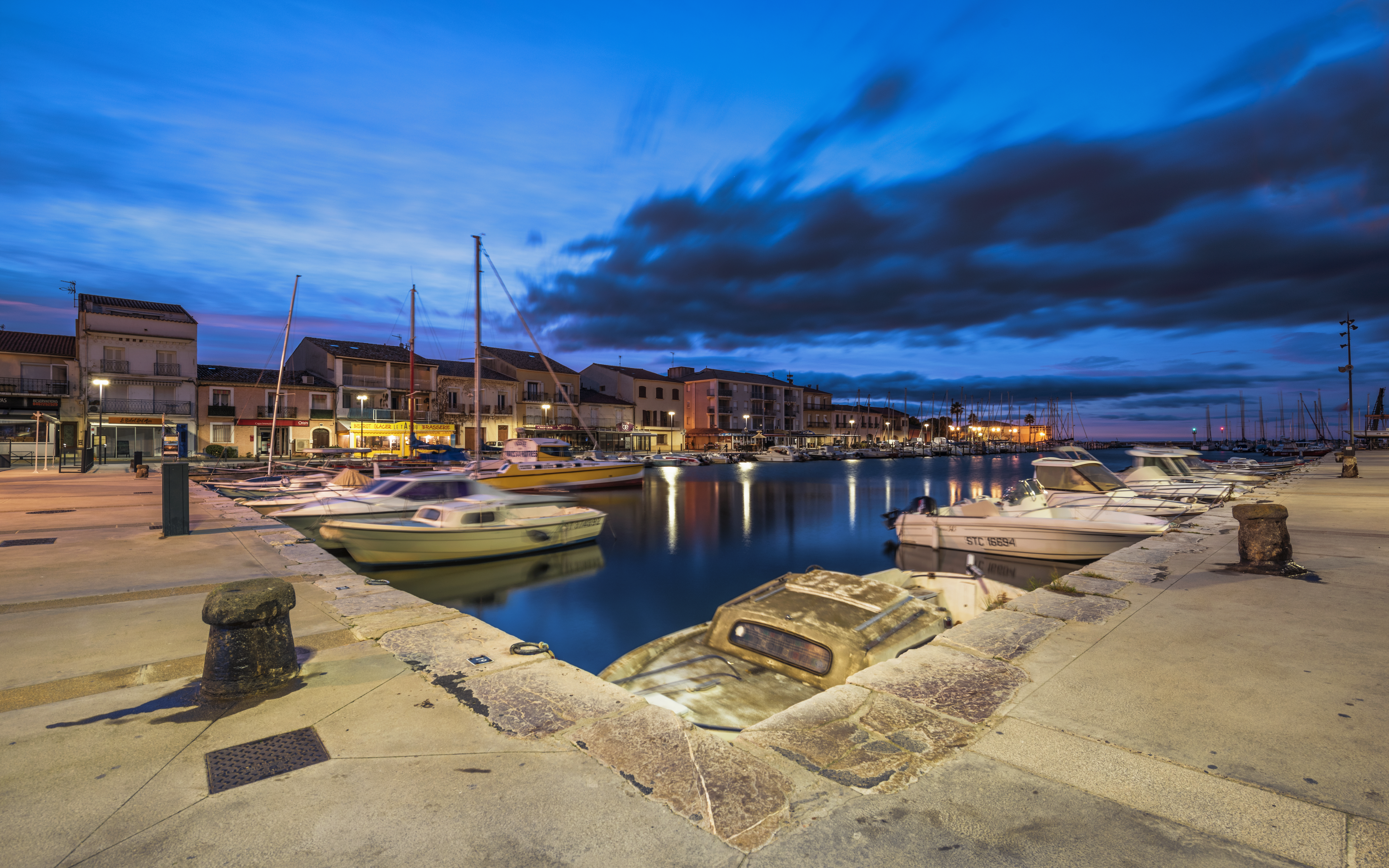
Harbour of Mèze

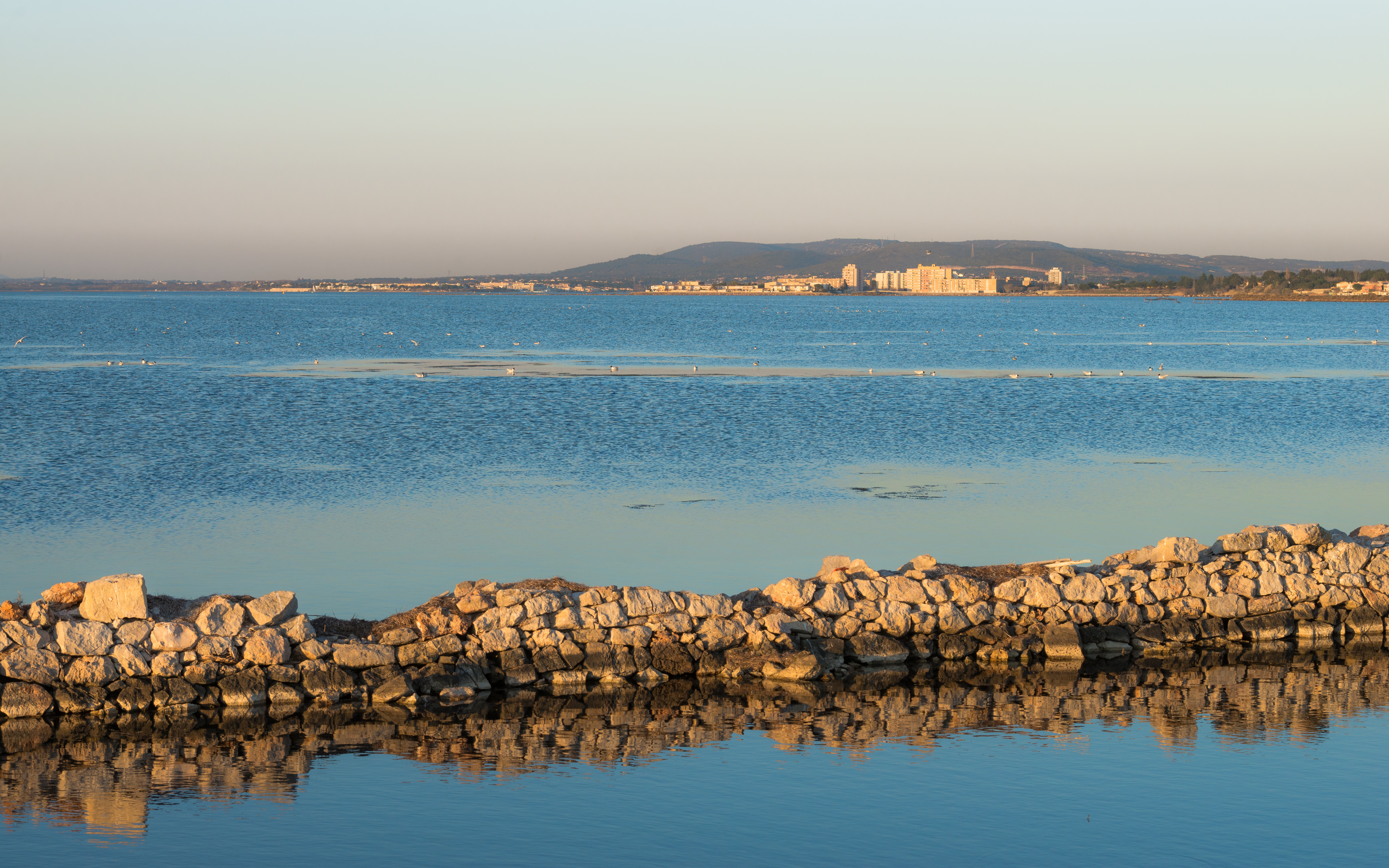
The Île de Thau neighbourhood and the Étang de Thau seen from the "Lido de Thau" in Sète

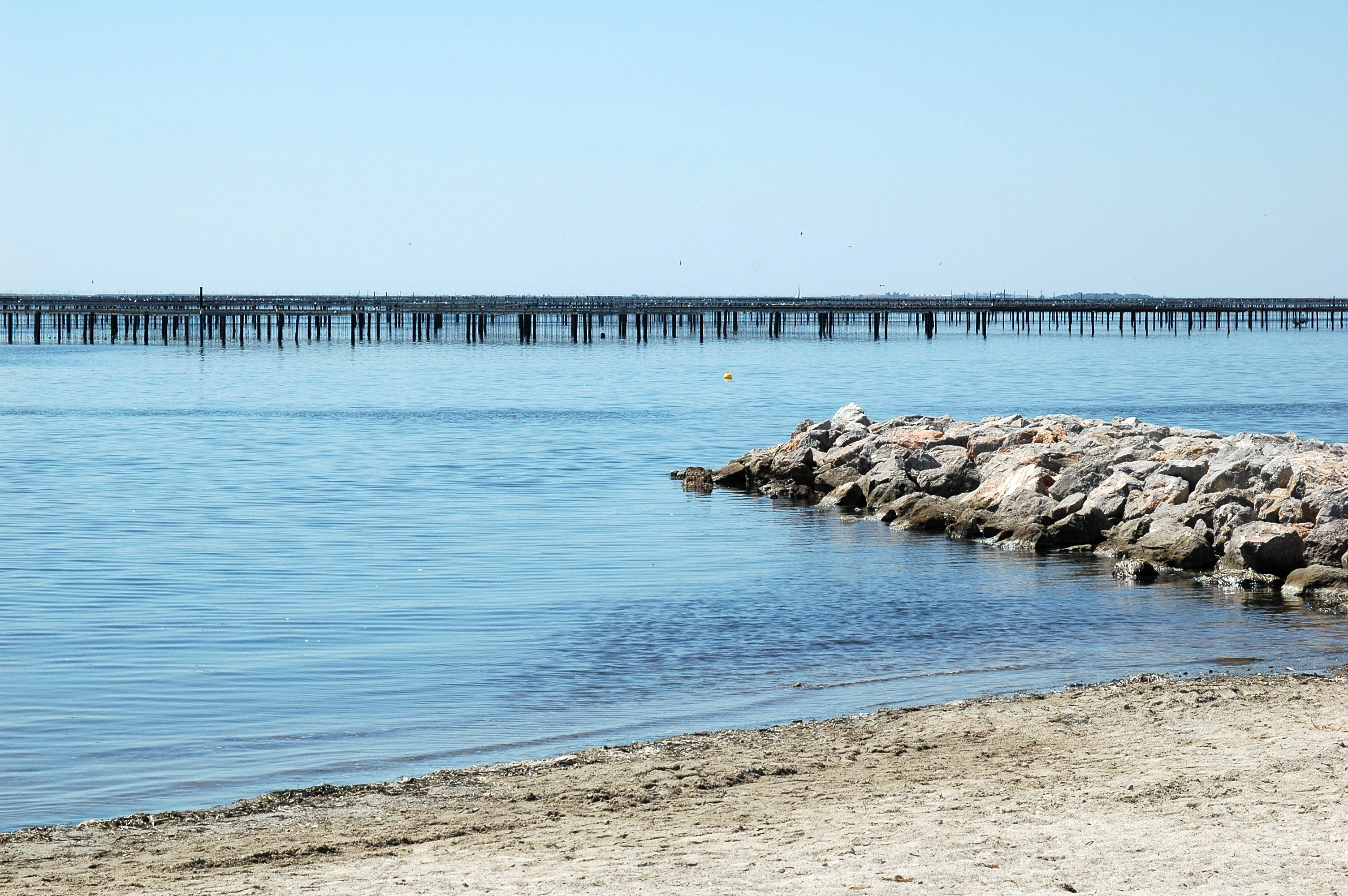
Oyster production at Bouzigues

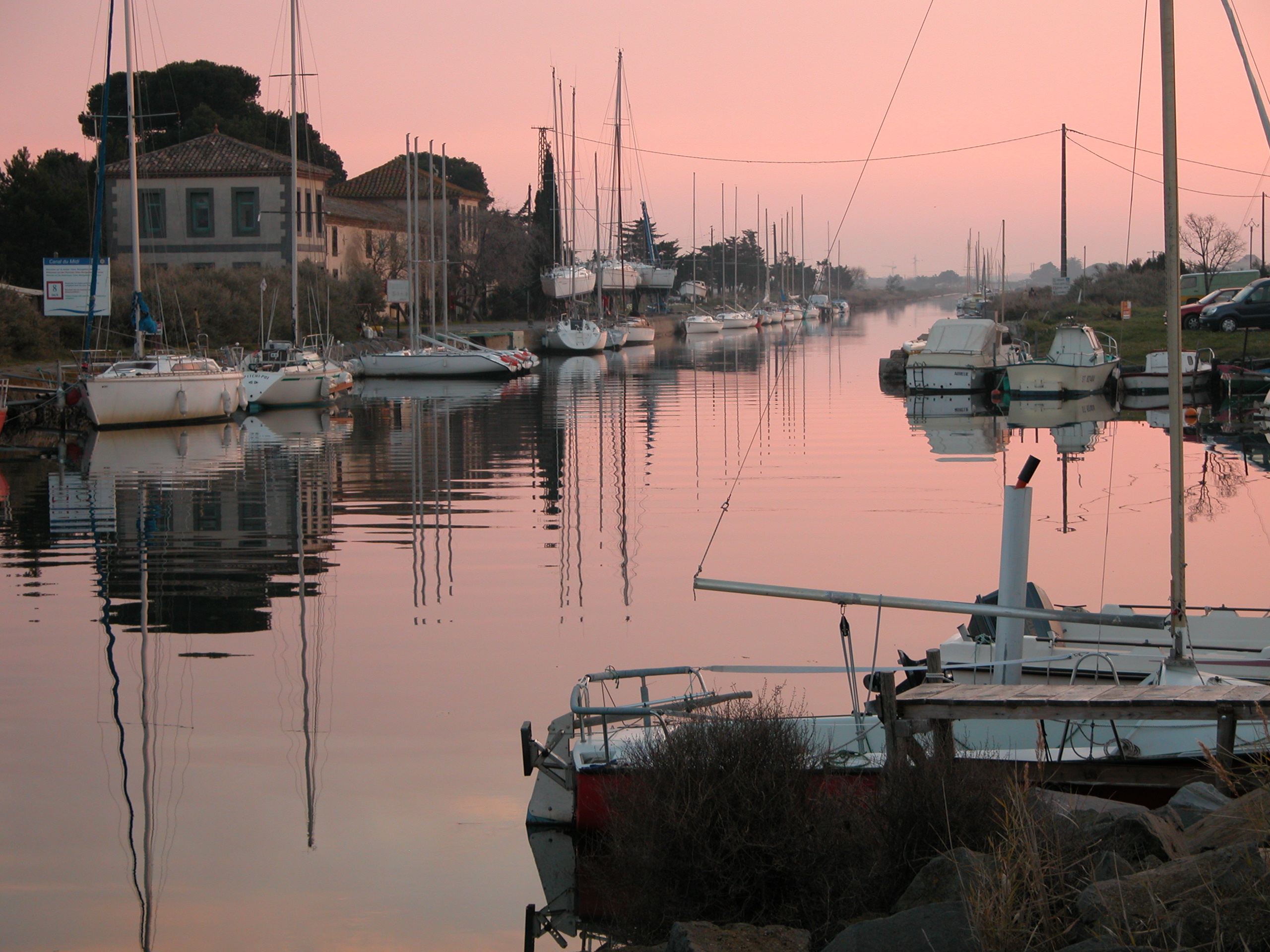
Canal du Midi joins Étang de Thau in Marseillan

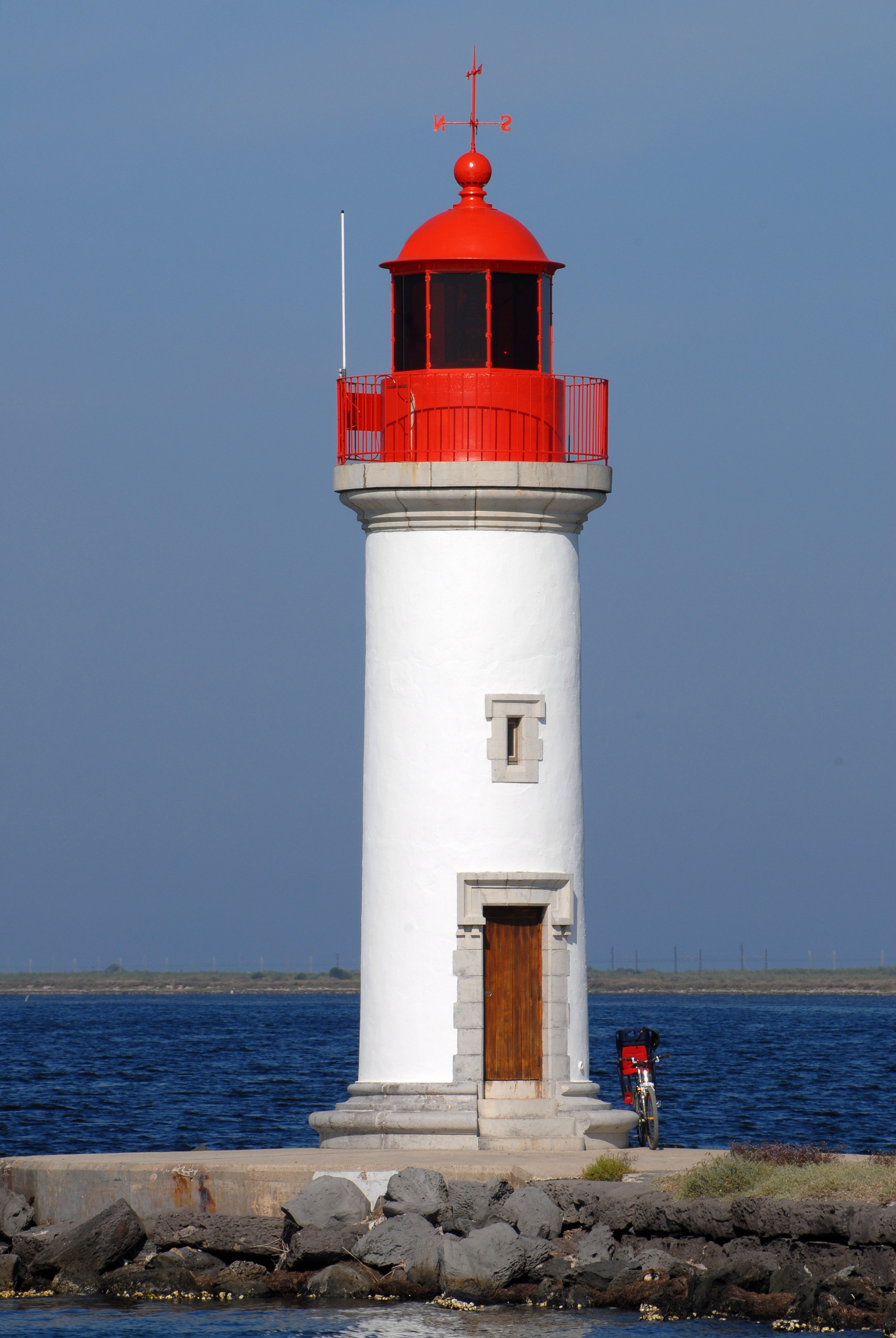
Phare des Onglous lighthouse at the mouth of Canal du Midi
