= Mireval =

- Commune
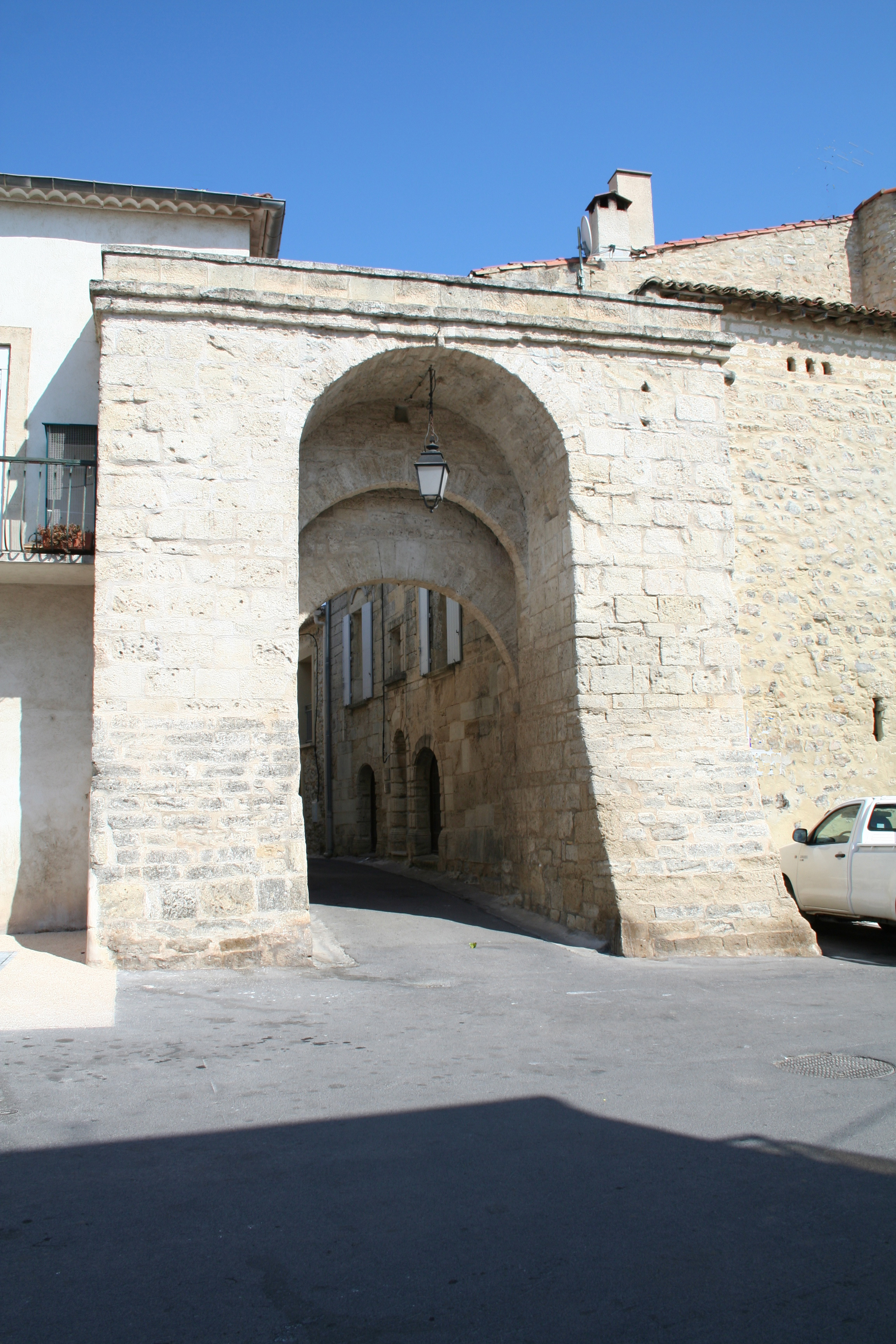
- City gate

- Coat of arms
- Location of Mireval
- Location within France Location within Occitanie
- Coordinates: 43°30′31″N 3°48′06″E
- Country: France
- Region: Occitania
- Department: Hérault
- Arrondissement: Montpellier
- Canton: Frontignan
- Intercommunality: CA Sète Agglopôle Méditerranée

Government
  - Mayor (2020–2026): Christophe Durand
- Area^{1}: 11.05 km^{2} (4.27 sq mi)
- Elevation: 5 m (16 ft)
- Highest elevation: 196 m (643 ft)
- Lowest elevation: 0 m (0 ft)
- Population (2023): 3,301
  - Density: 298.7/km^{2} (773.7/sq mi)
- Time zone: UTC+01:00 (CET)
  - Summer (DST): UTC+02:00 (CEST)
- INSEE/Postal code: 34159 /34110
- ^{1} French Land Register data, which excludes lakes, ponds, glaciers > 1 km^{2} (0.386 sq mi or 247 acres) and river estuaries.

Mireval (French pronunciation: [miʁval]; Occitan: Miravau) is a commune in the Hérault department in Occitanie in southern France. Vic-Mireval station has rail connections to Narbonne, Montpellier and Avignon.

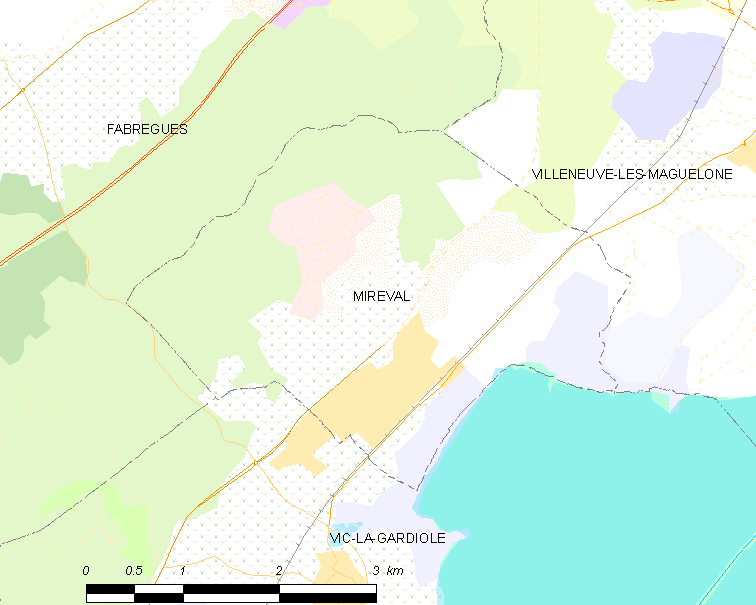
Map

It is famous for its muscat wine, the Muscat de Mireval, about which François Rabelais wrote at the beginning of the 16th century.

== Population ==
Historical population
Year	Pop.	±% p.a.
1968	781	—
1975	839	+1.03%
1982	1,105	+4.01%
1990	2,355	+9.92%
1999	3,049	+2.91%
2007	3,151	+0.41%
2012	3,272	+0.76%
2017	3,283	+0.07%
2023	3,301	+0.09%
Source: INSEE

== Gallery ==
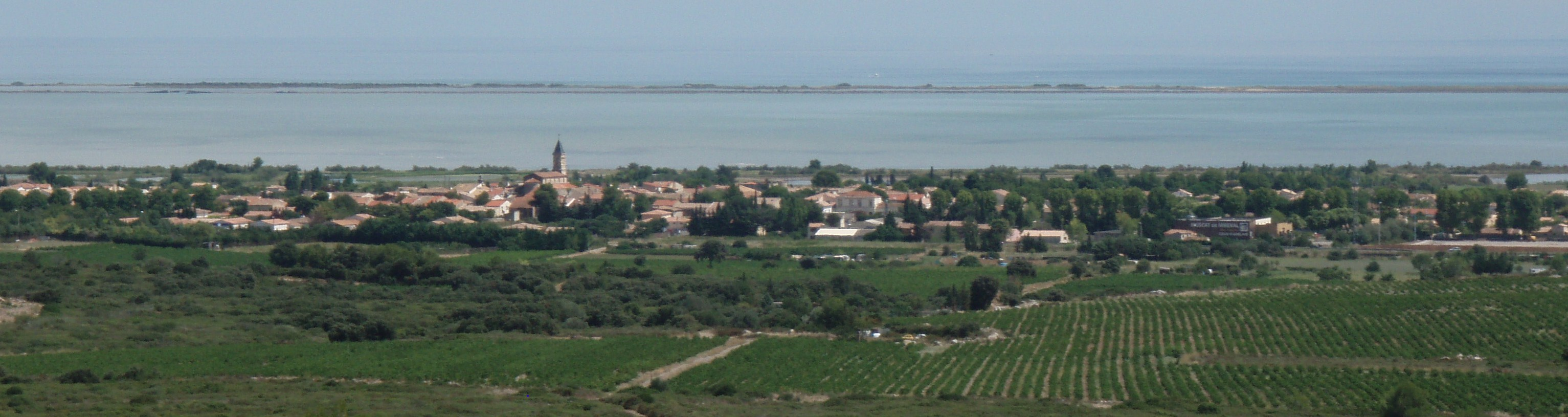
The village and, in the foreground, the Muscat vineyard

== See also ==
- Communes of the Hérault department
