= Balaruc-les-Bains =

- Commune
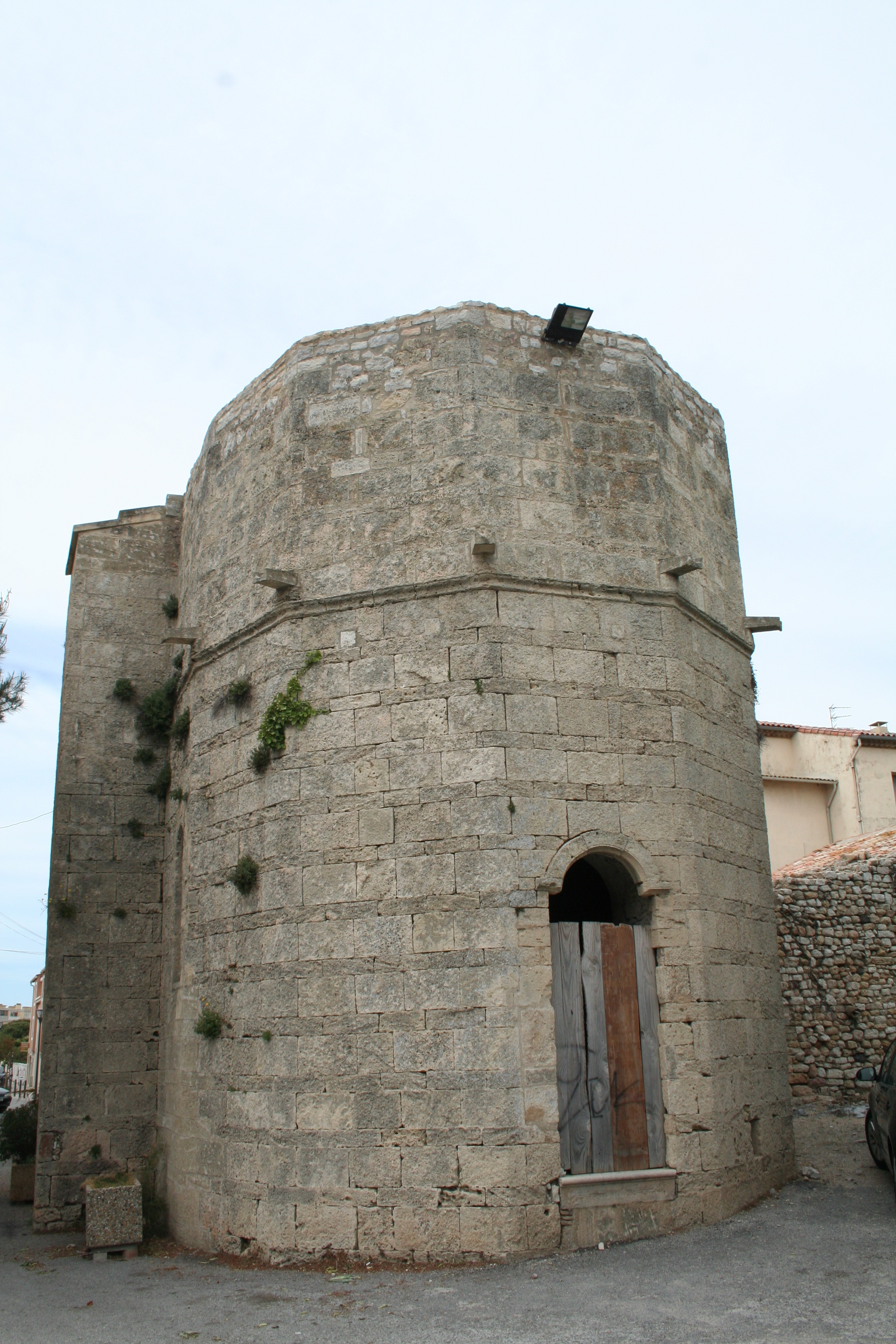
- Church ND d'Aix

- Coat of arms
- Location of Balaruc-les-Bains
- Location within France Location within Occitanie
- Coordinates: 43°26′30″N 3°40′40″E
- Country: France
- Region: Occitania
- Department: Hérault
- Arrondissement: Montpellier
- Canton: Frontignan
- Intercommunality: CA Sète Agglopôle Méditerranée

Government
  - Mayor (2020–2026): Gérard Canovas
- Area^{1}: 8.66 km^{2} (3.34 sq mi)
- Elevation: 3 m (9.8 ft)
- Highest elevation: 169 m (554 ft)
- Lowest elevation: 0 m (0 ft)
- Population (2023): 7,139
  - Density: 824/km^{2} (2,140/sq mi)
- Time zone: UTC+01:00 (CET)
  - Summer (DST): UTC+02:00 (CEST)
- INSEE/Postal code: 34023 /34540
- ^{1} French Land Register data, which excludes lakes, ponds, glaciers > 1 km^{2} (0.386 sq mi or 247 acres) and river estuaries.

Balaruc-les-Bains (French pronunciation: [balaʁyk le bɛ̃]; Occitan: Los Banhs de Balaruc) is a commune in the Hérault department in the Occitanie region in southern France.

== Population ==
Historical population
Year	Pop.	±% p.a.
1968	1,830	—
1975	2,957	+7.10%
1982	4,369	+5.73%
1990	5,013	+1.73%
1999	5,688	+1.41%
2007	6,130	+0.94%
2012	6,886	+2.35%
2017	6,751	−0.40%
2023	7,139	+0.94%
Source: INSEE

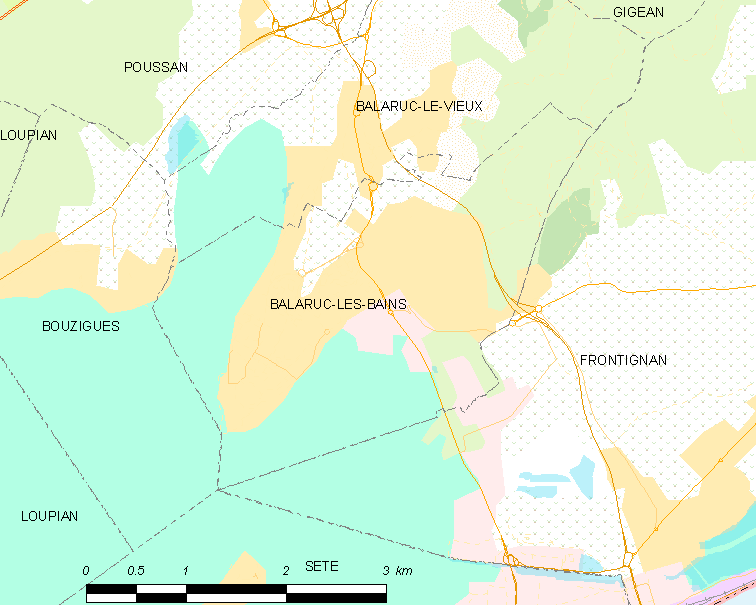
Map

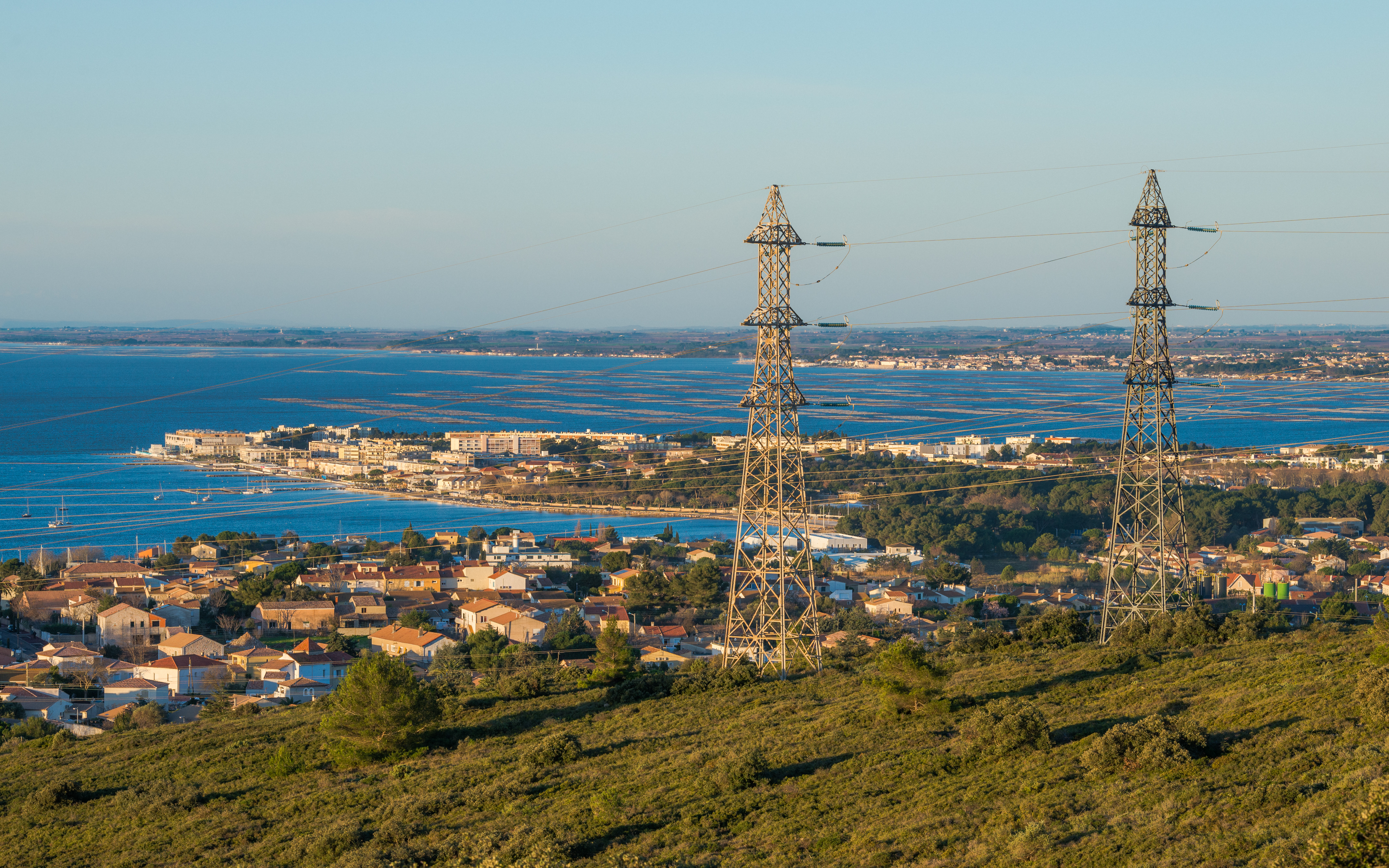
From La Gardiole Mountain.

== See also ==
- Communes of the Hérault department
- Balaruc
- Étang de Thau
