= Impost =

Impost may mean:

- A type of tax, especially a tax levied on imports
- A handicap (usually a lead weight) used in horse racing
- Impost (architecture): a block or capital on which an arch rests
