= Balaruc =

Former commune in France

Coordinates: 43.4569°N 3.689777°E

Balaruc is a former commune of the Hérault department in southern France. It was suppressed in 1886 and split into two new separate communes:

- Baillargues-et-Colombier, renamed Balaruc-les-Bains in 1908, and
- Balaruc-le-Vieux
