= Balaruc-le-Vieux =

- Commune
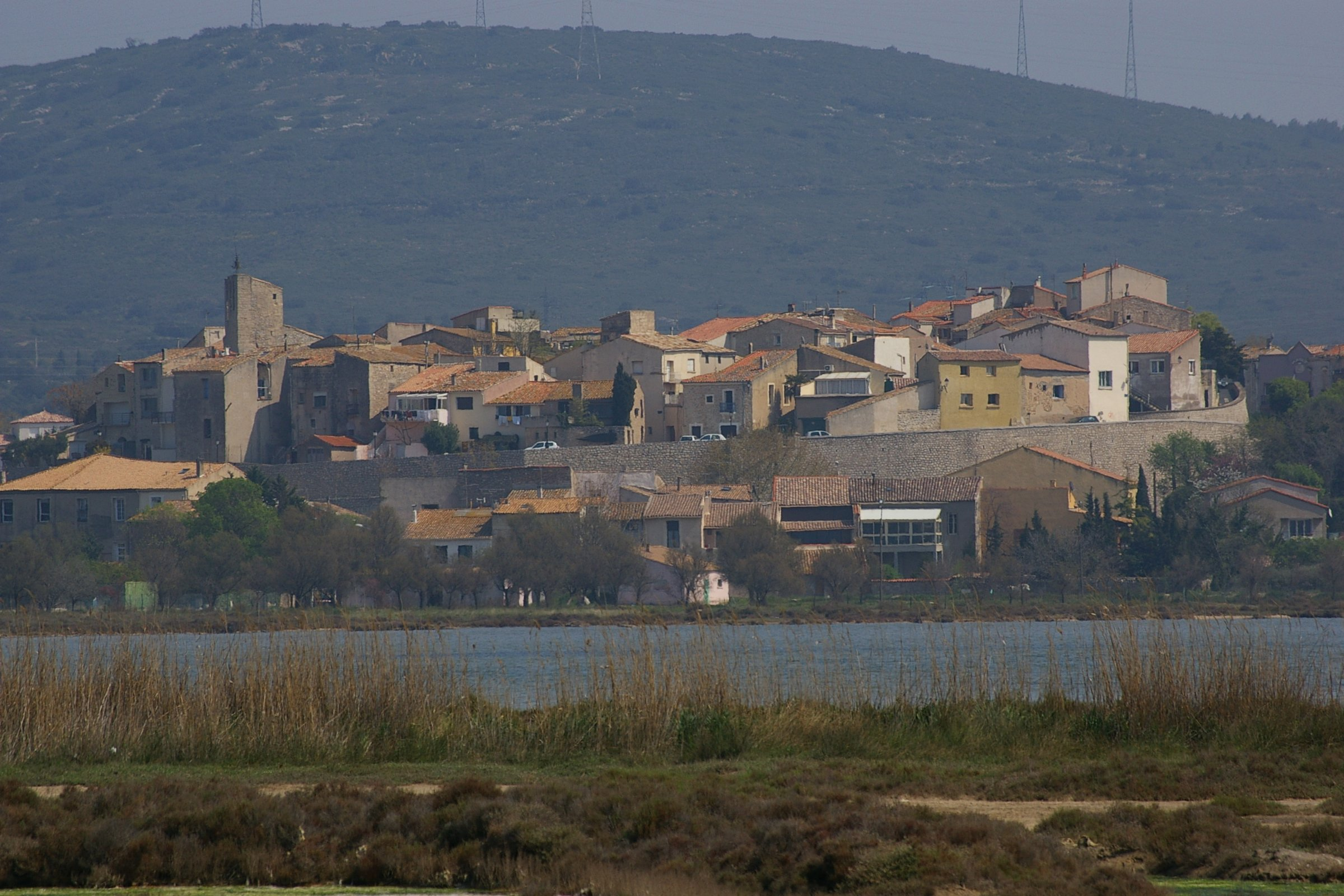
- View of Balaruc-le-Vieux across the Étang de Thau

- Coat of arms
- Location of Balaruc-le-Vieux
- Location within France Location within Occitanie
- Coordinates: 43°27′41″N 3°41′07″E
- Country: France
- Region: Occitania
- Department: Hérault
- Arrondissement: Montpellier
- Canton: Frontignan
- Intercommunality: CA Sète Agglopôle Méditerranée

Government
  - Mayor (2020–2026): Norbert Chaplin
- Area^{1}: 5.92 km^{2} (2.29 sq mi)
- Elevation: 12 m (39 ft)
- Highest elevation: 196 m (643 ft)
- Lowest elevation: 0 m (0 ft)
- Population (2023): 2,737
  - Density: 462/km^{2} (1,200/sq mi)
- Time zone: UTC+01:00 (CET)
  - Summer (DST): UTC+02:00 (CEST)
- INSEE/Postal code: 34024 /34540
- ^{1} French Land Register data, which excludes lakes, ponds, glaciers > 1 km^{2} (0.386 sq mi or 247 acres) and river estuaries.

Balaruc-le-Vieux (French pronunciation: [balaʁyk lə vjø]; Occitan: Balaruc Vièlh) is a commune in the Hérault department in the Occitanie region in southern France.

== Population ==
Historical population
Year	Pop.	±% p.a.
1968	533	—
1975	521	−0.32%
1982	701	+4.33%
1990	1,065	+5.37%
1999	1,802	+6.02%
2007	2,031	+1.51%
2012	2,234	+1.92%
2017	2,628	+3.30%
2023	2,737	+0.68%
Source: INSEE

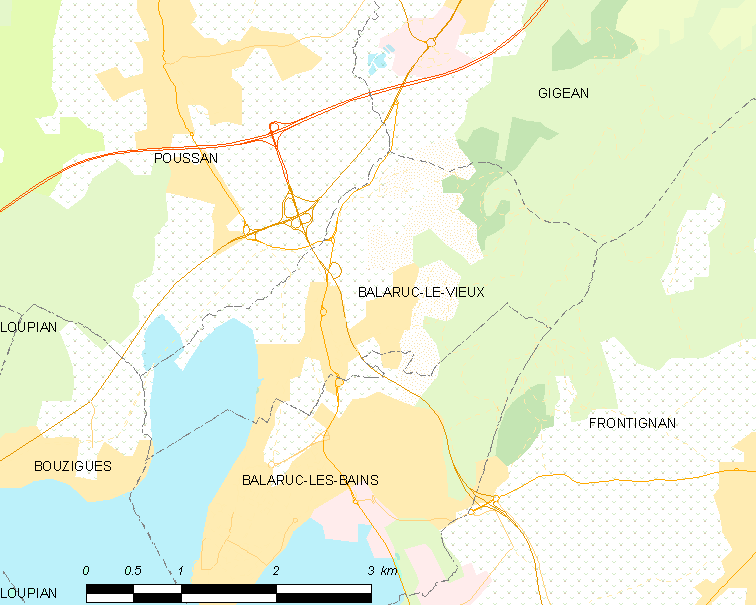
Map

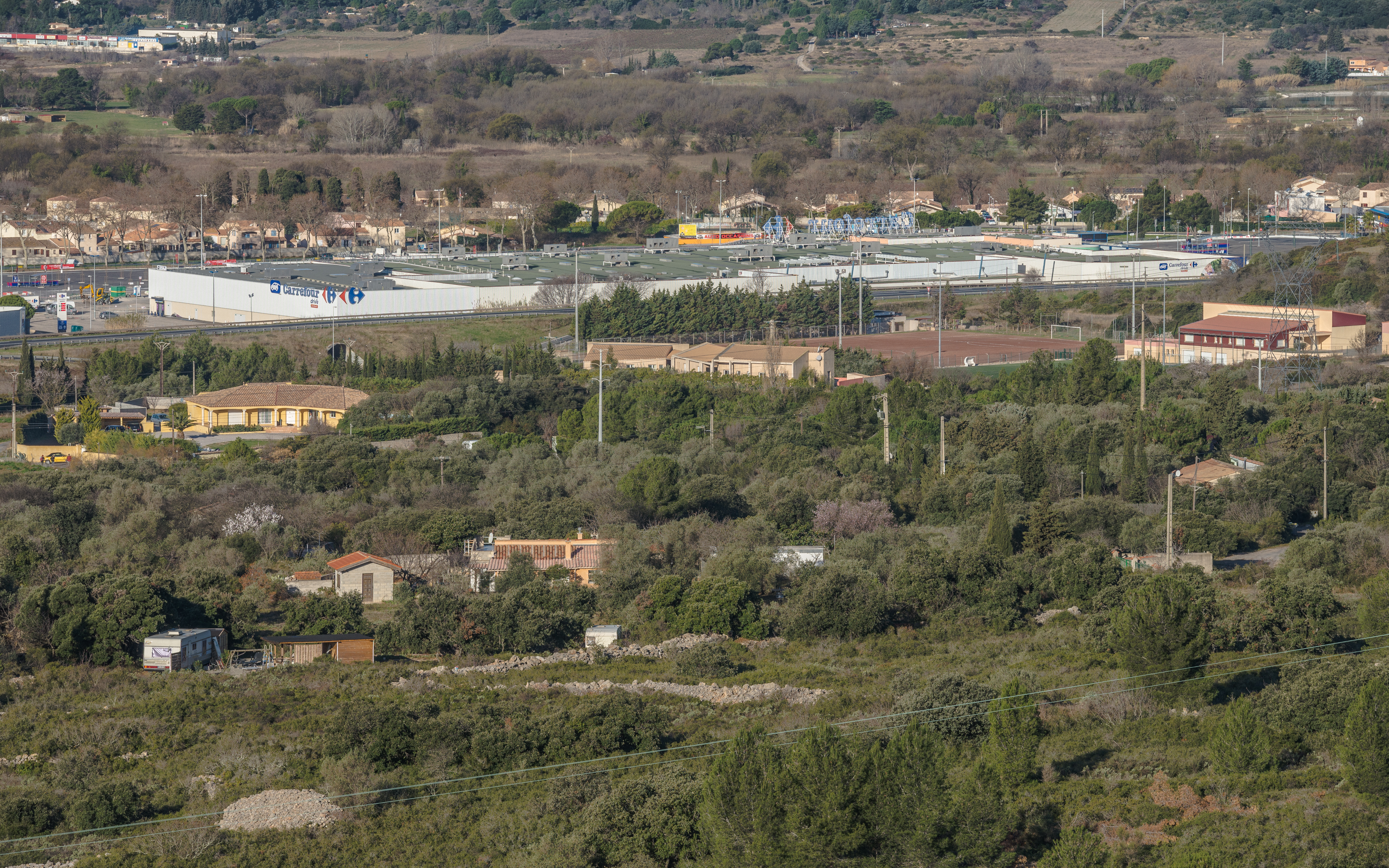
The shopping mall from the Southeast.

== See also ==
- Communes of the Hérault department
- Balaruc
- Étang de Thau
