= Vic-la-Gardiole =

- Commune
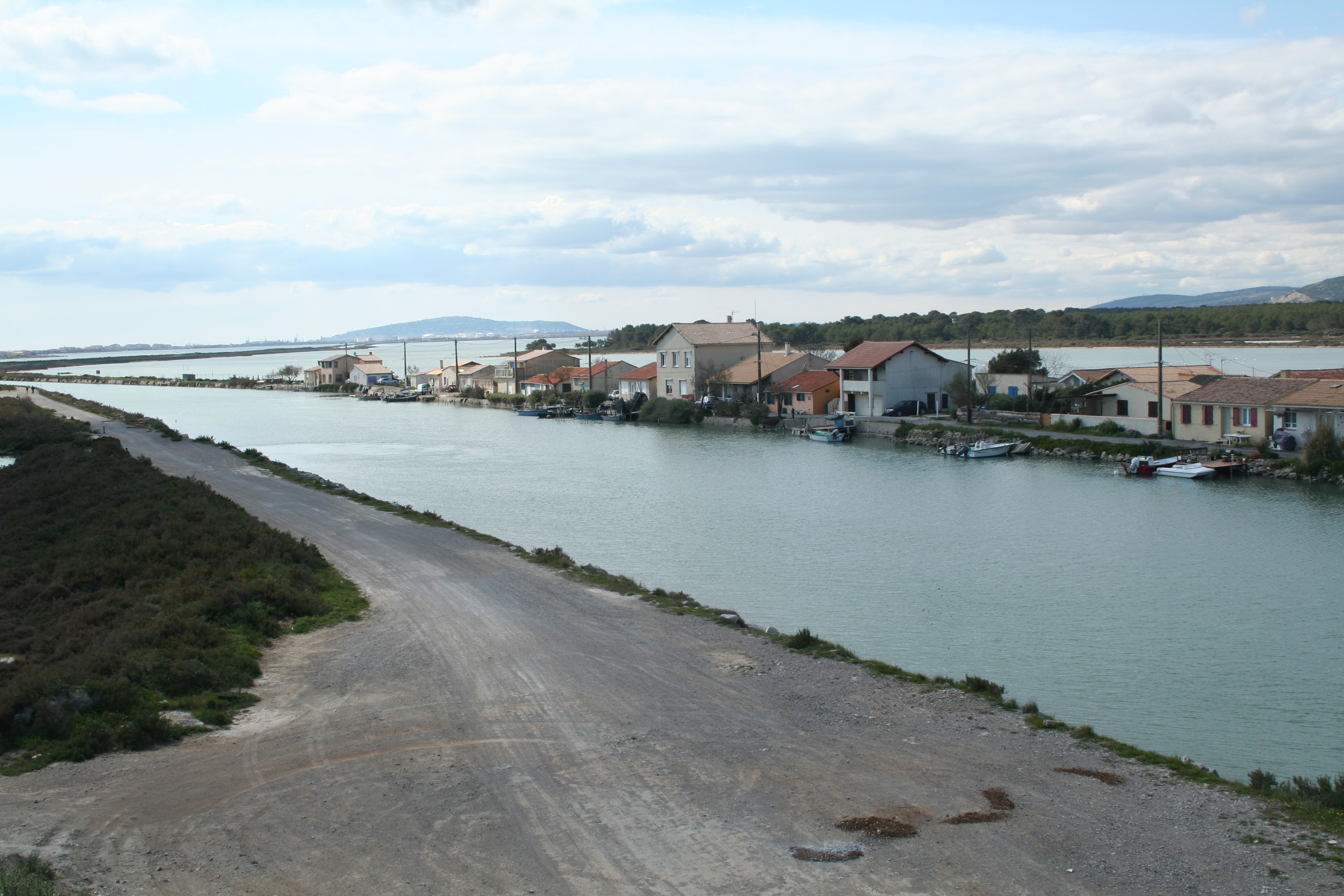
- Canal du Rhône à Sète between two marshes at Les Aresquiers

- Coat of arms
- Location of Vic-la-Gardiole
- Location within France Location within Occitanie
- Coordinates: 43°29′27″N 3°47′51″E
- Country: France
- Region: Occitania
- Department: Hérault
- Arrondissement: Montpellier
- Canton: Frontignan
- Intercommunality: CA Sète Agglopôle Méditerranée

Government
  - Mayor (2020–2026): Magali Ferrier
- Area^{1}: 18.49 km^{2} (7.14 sq mi)
- Elevation: 10 m (33 ft)
- Highest elevation: 216 m (709 ft)
- Lowest elevation: 0 m (0 ft)
- Population (2023): 3,428
  - Density: 185.4/km^{2} (480.2/sq mi)
- Time zone: UTC+01:00 (CET)
  - Summer (DST): UTC+02:00 (CEST)
- INSEE/Postal code: 34333 /34110
- ^{1} French Land Register data, which excludes lakes, ponds, glaciers > 1 km^{2} (0.386 sq mi or 247 acres) and river estuaries.

Vic-la-Gardiole (French pronunciation: [vik la gaʁdjɔl]; Occitan: Vic la Gardiòla) is a commune in the Hérault department in the Occitanie region in southern France.

== Population ==
Historical population
Year	Pop.	±% p.a.
1968	528	—
1975	602	+1.89%
1982	827	+4.64%
1990	1,607	+8.66%
1999	2,464	+4.86%
2007	2,812	+1.67%
2012	2,978	+1.15%
2017	3,261	+1.83%
2023	3,428	+0.84%
Source: INSEE

== Gallery ==
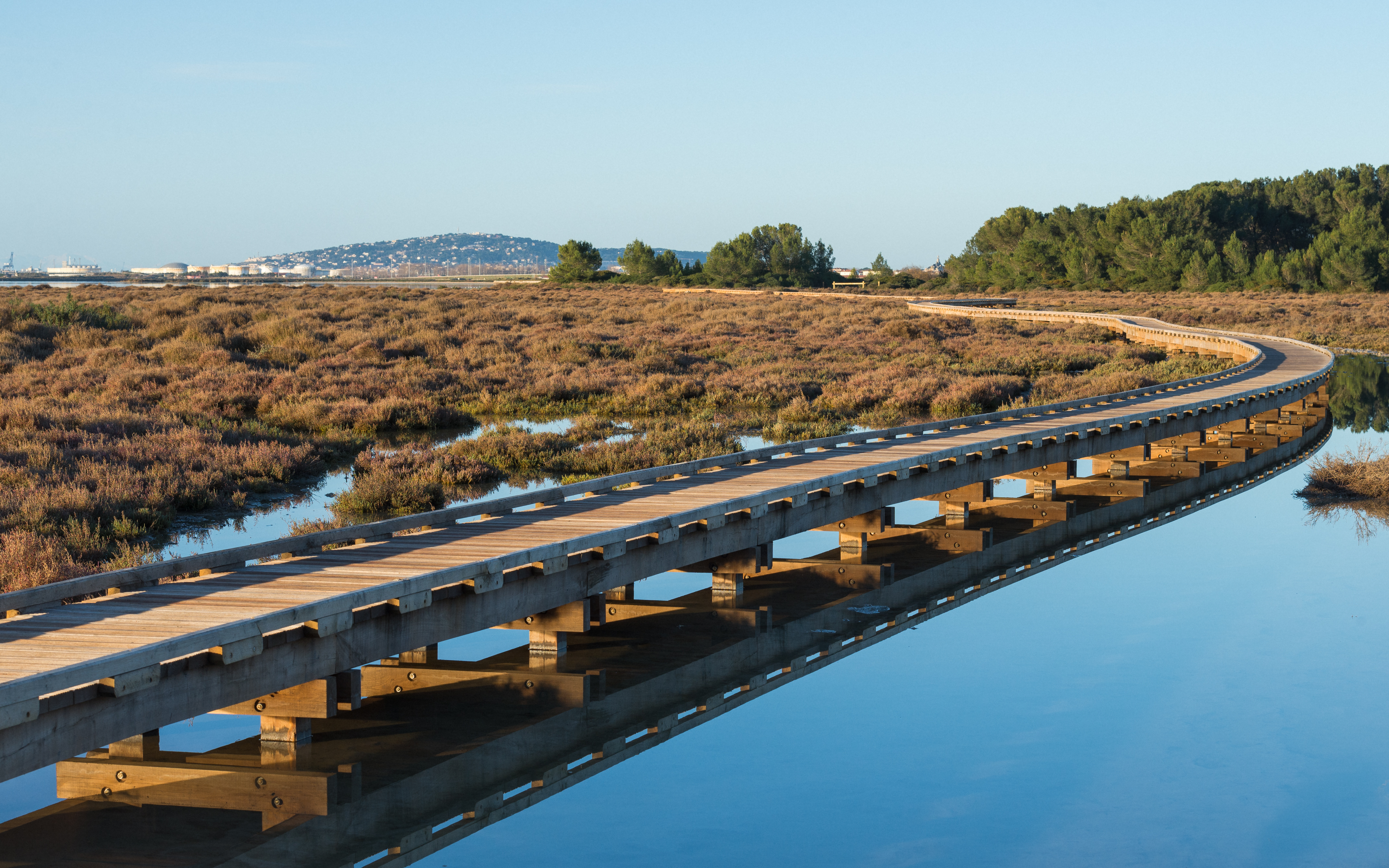
"Bois des Aresquiers"

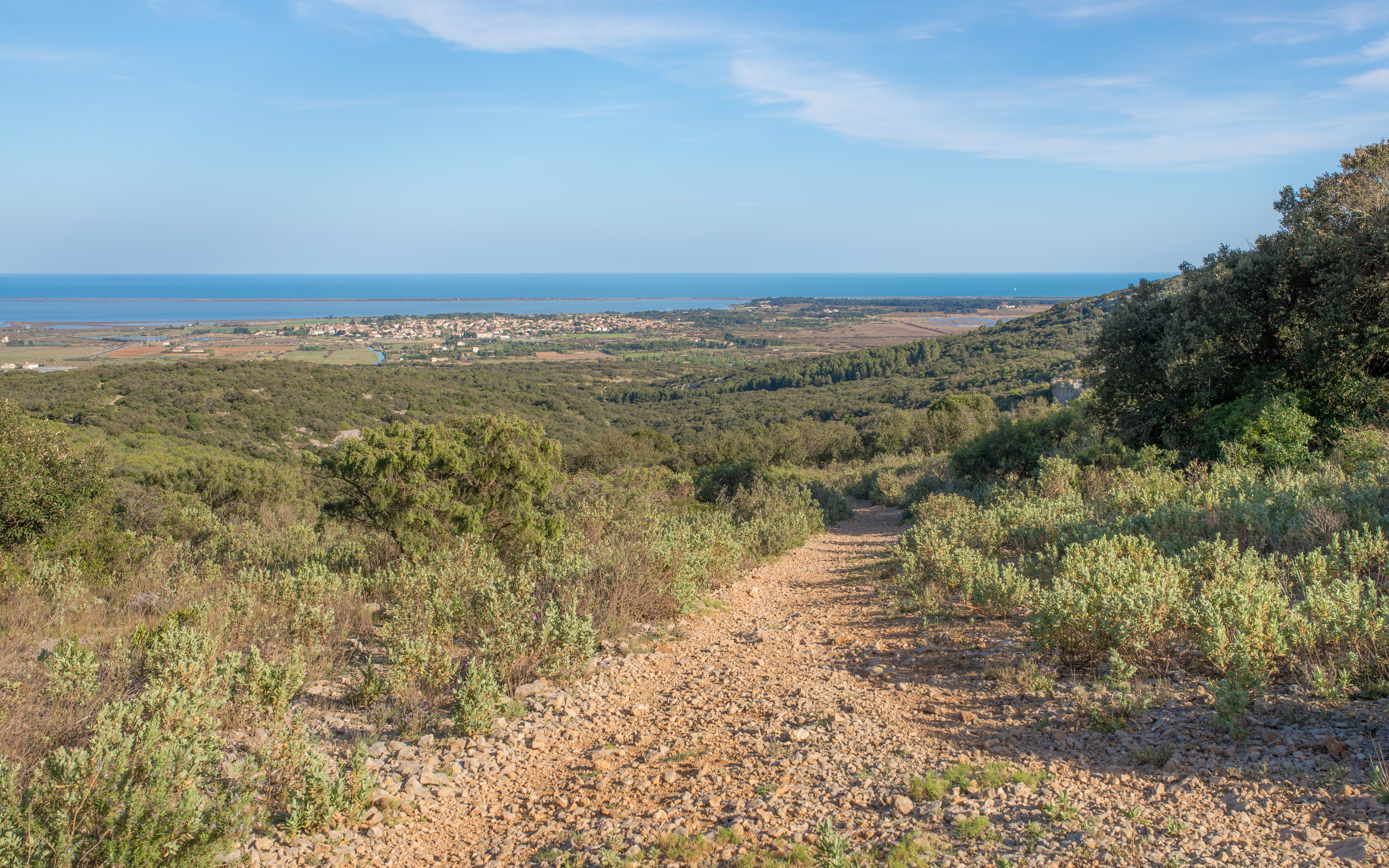
View from the Northwest

== See also ==
- Communes of the Hérault department
