= Communauté de communes du Nord du Bassin de Thau =

Coordinates: 43.5014°N 3.6013°E

Nord du Bassin de Thau
- Former communauté de communes
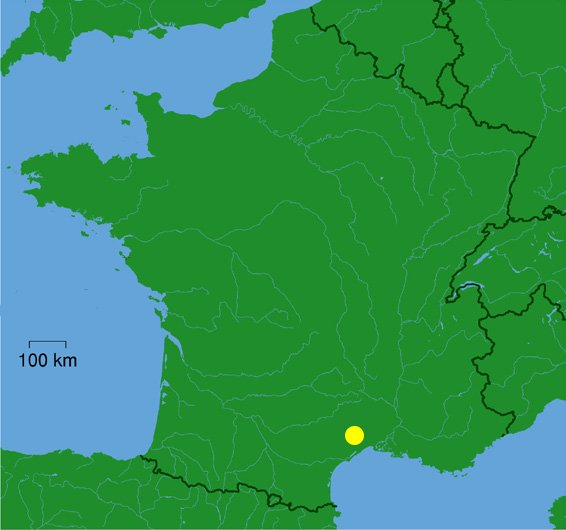
- Country: France
- Region: Occitania
- Department: Hérault
- No. of communes: {{{nbcomm}}}
- Established: 2000
- Disbanded: 2017
- Population: 18,790

The Communauté de communes du Nord du Bassin de Thau is a former intercommunal government structure, in the Hérault département of southern France. It stems from the Syndicat Intercommunal du Nord du Bassin de Thau. It was established on 21 December 2000. It was merged into the Communauté d'agglomération du Bassin de Thau in January 2017. This was renamed Sète Agglopôle Méditerranée in September 2017.

== Composition ==
The Communauté de communes comprised the following communes:

- Bouzigues
- Loupian
- Mèze
- Montbazin
- Poussan
- Villeveyrac

== Jurisdiction ==
The CABT has four mandatory areas of jurisdiction:

- Economic development of intercommunal links,
- Land management.

Areas of shared jurisdiction are:

- Assessment, protection, and economic impact of the local environment,
- Housing Policy
