= Sète Agglopôle Méditerranée =

Coordinates: 43.44167°N 3.67778°E

- Communauté d'agglomération
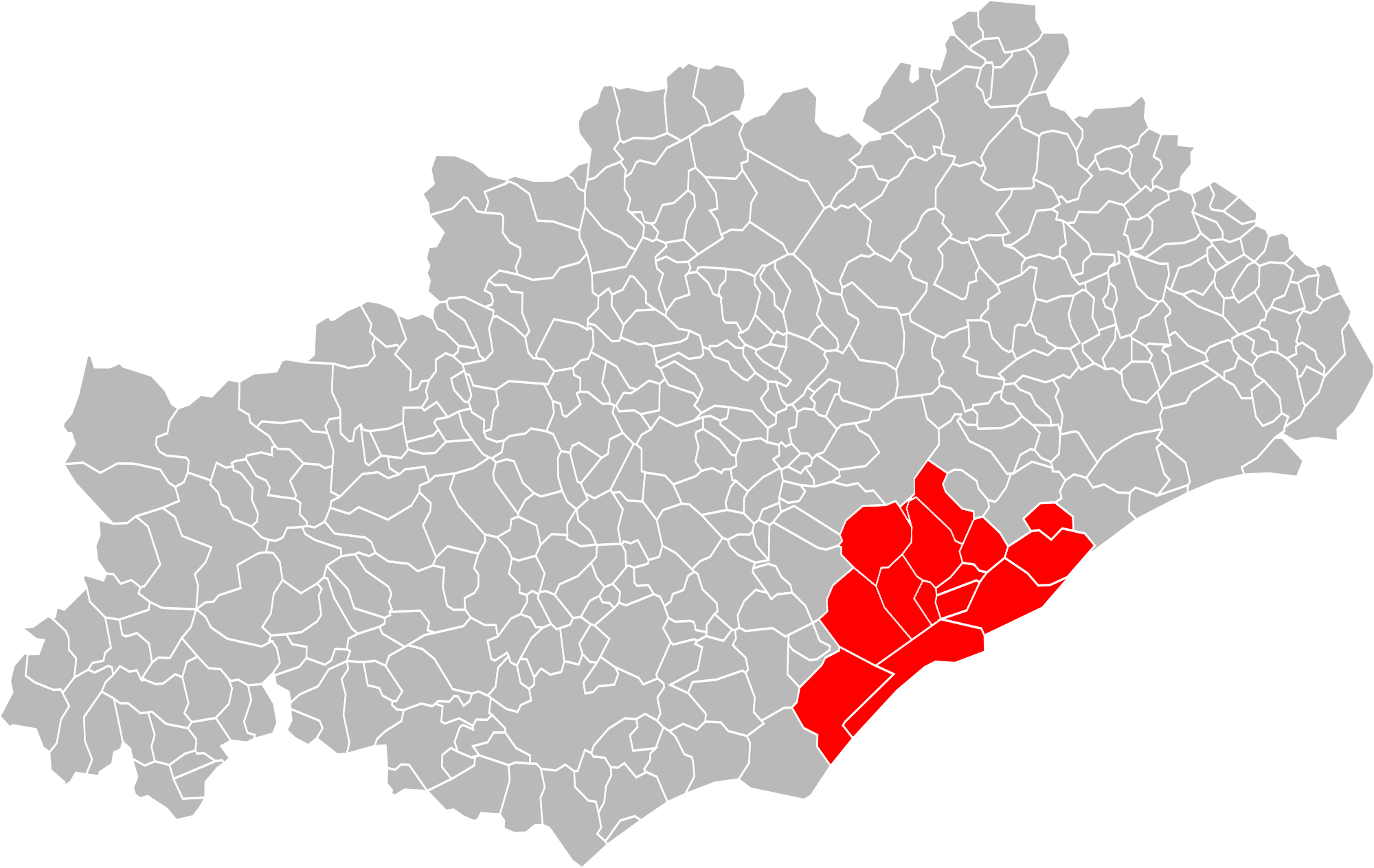
- Location within the Hérault department
- Country: France
- Region: Occitania
- Department: Hérault
- No. of communes: {{{nbcomm}}}
- Established: 2002

Government
  - President: François Commeinhes
- Area: 310.3 km^{2} (119.8 sq mi)
- Population (2018): 125,325
  - Density: 403.9/km^{2} (1,046/sq mi)
- Website: www.agglopole.fr

Sète Agglopôle Méditerranée (before September 2017: Communauté d'agglomération du Bassin de Thau) is an intercommunal government structure, in the Hérault département of the Occitanie région, in France. Its seat is in Frontignan. Its area is 310.3 km^{2}. Its population was 125,325 in 2018, of which 43,686 were in Sète and 22,731 in Frontignan. The Communauté d'agglomération du Bassin de Thau was established in December 2002. The former Communauté de communes du Nord du Bassin de Thau was merged into it in January 2017, and its name was changed to Sète Agglopôle Méditerranée in September 2017.

== Composition ==
The agglomeration community consists of 14 communes:

1. Balaruc-les-Bains
2. Balaruc-le-Vieux
3. Bouzigues
4. Frontignan
5. Gigean
6. Loupian
7. Marseillan
8. Mèze
9. Mireval
10. Montbazin
11. Poussan
12. Sète
13. Vic-la-Gardiole
14. Villeveyrac

== Jurisdiction ==
The agglomeration community has four mandatory areas of jurisdiction:

- Economic development,
- Land management,
- Environmental protection,
- Town political structures.

It also oversees:

- Organization of common transport problems,
- Sanitation collection and treatment,
- Assessment, protection, and economic impact of the local environment,
- The creation, management and assessment of cultural and sporting organizations across the communes.

== Activities ==
Areas over which the agglomeration community has shared jurisdiction:

- Ports,
- Fisheries and shellfish cultivation,
- Vineyard Cultivation,
- Wine and Spirits production,
- Thermal Energy production,
- Tourism.
