= Loupian Roman villa =

Coordinates: 43.4401°N 3.6143°E

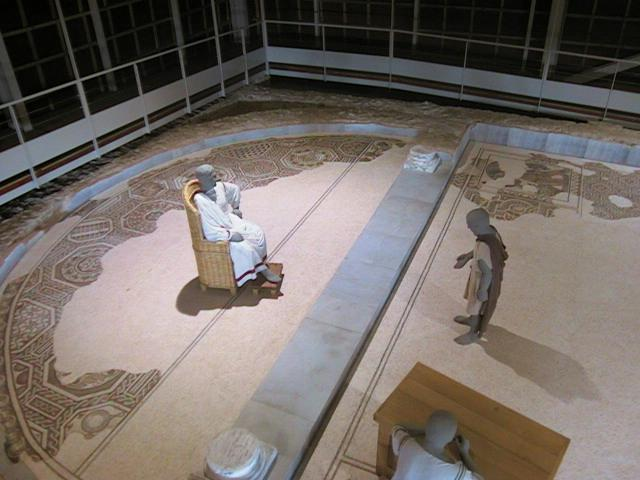

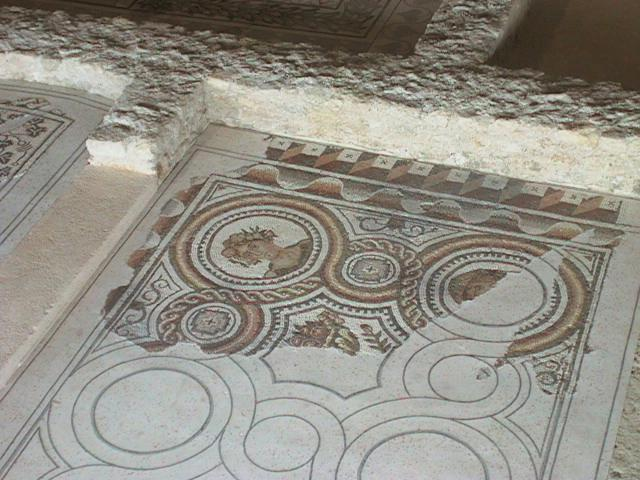

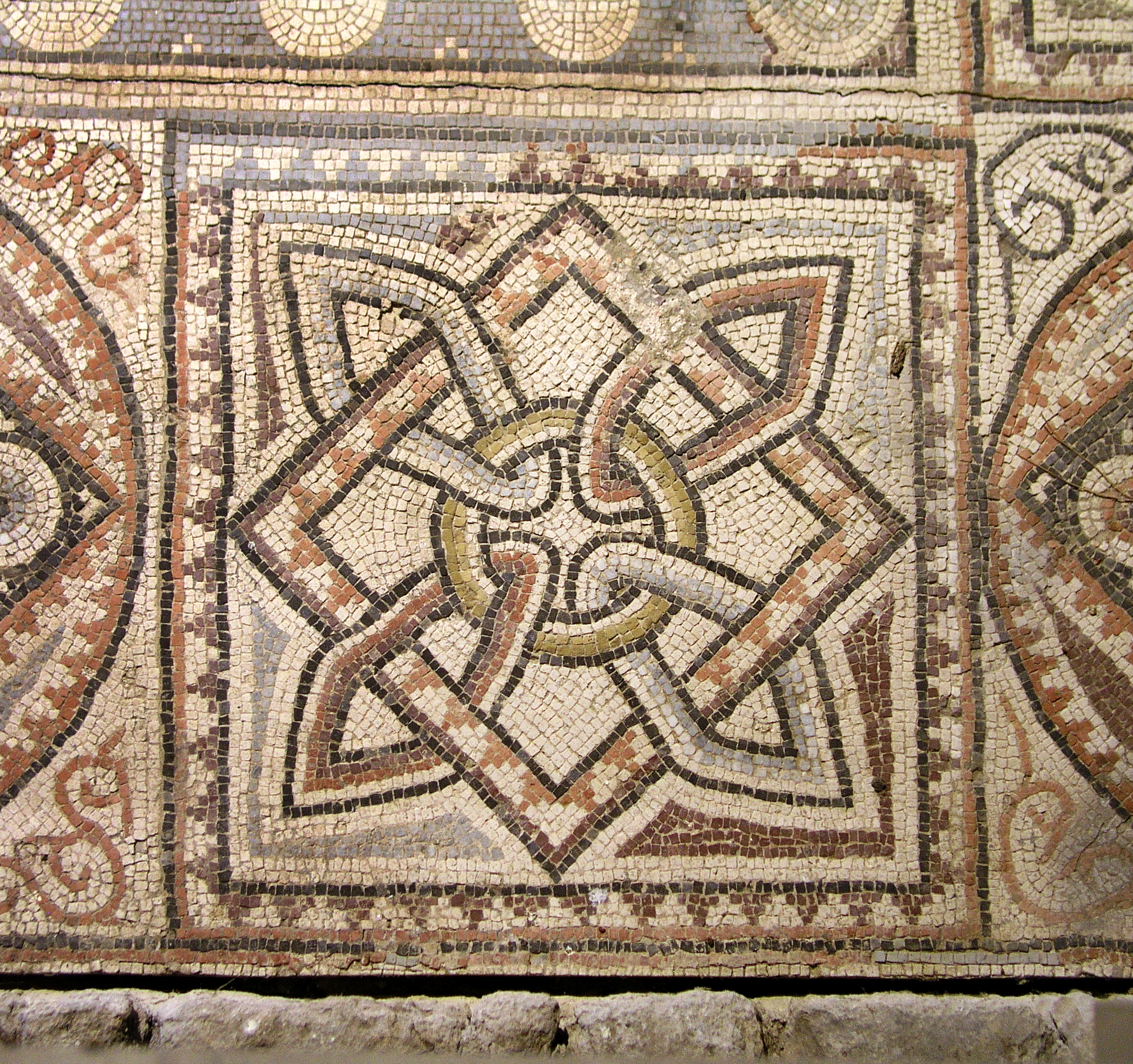

Loupian Roman villa is in the village of Loupian in the Hérault département of France, between Montpellier and Béziers, the heart of Gallia Narbonensis. Excavations on a three-hectare site south of the village have revealed remains of a Roman farm villa with extensive 2nd-century Gallo-Roman mosaics. The site was occupied for more than 600 years.

== History ==
Originally a modest farmstead built a few kilometres south of the Via Domitia, it rapidly prospered and grew on the hillside overlooking the Bassin de Thau. During the early Empire, in the 1st and 2nd centuries, the villa was a large patrician residence with thermal springs. The main agricultural activity was viticulture, for which a storehouse capable of holding 1,500 hl of wine was constructed. This period also saw the building of a small port on the northern shore of the Bassin de Thau, as well as pottery workshops producing amphorae for the transportation of wine.

In the 5th century, the villa was completely rebuilt, and the owner's home became a small mansion. The thirteen ground-floor rooms are covered in multicoloured, highly decorated mosaics. By now, the potteries were producing amphorae and household pottery.

== The mosaics ==
The springs from the original house were decorated with 2nd-century mosaics. However, those in the later villa are unique since there is no other villa in which the influences of two geographically separated countries, Aquitaine and Syria, have come together. This oddity is perhaps explained by the owner's eclectic taste or a desire to complete the work quickly. Theoretically, a team of four mosaic workers would take a year to cover a 500 m^{2} floor. At Loupian, two teams working together could have laid the original 450 m^{2} between six and eighteen months.
