= Mèze =

- Commune
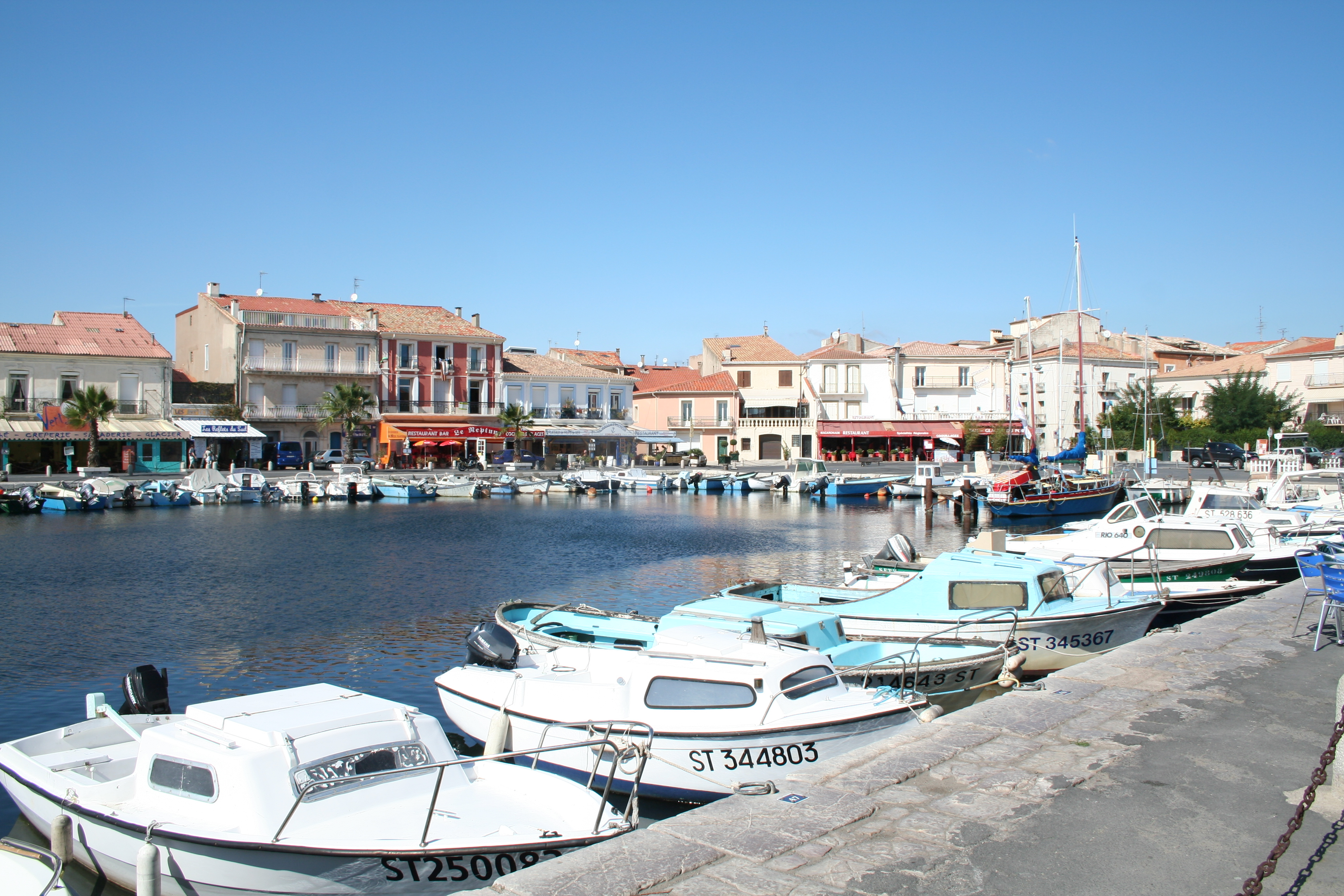
- Harbour

- Coat of arms
- Location of Mèze
- Location within France Location within Occitanie
- Coordinates: 43°25′40″N 3°36′21″E
- Country: France
- Region: Occitania
- Department: Hérault
- Arrondissement: Montpellier
- Canton: Mèze
- Intercommunality: CA Sète Agglopôle Méditerranée

Government
  - Mayor (2021–2026): Thierry Baëza
- Area^{1}: 34.59 km^{2} (13.36 sq mi)
- Elevation: 20 m (66 ft)
- Highest elevation: 75 m (246 ft)
- Lowest elevation: 0 m (0 ft)
- Population (2023): 12,669
  - Density: 366.3/km^{2} (948.6/sq mi)
- Time zone: UTC+01:00 (CET)
  - Summer (DST): UTC+02:00 (CEST)
- INSEE/Postal code: 34157 /34140
- ^{1} French Land Register data, which excludes lakes, ponds, glaciers > 1 km^{2} (0.386 sq mi or 247 acres) and river estuaries.

Mèze (French pronunciation: [mɛz]; Occitan: Mesa; Phoenician: Mansa) is a commune in the Hérault department in southern France.

Its inhabitants are called Mézois.

== Geography ==
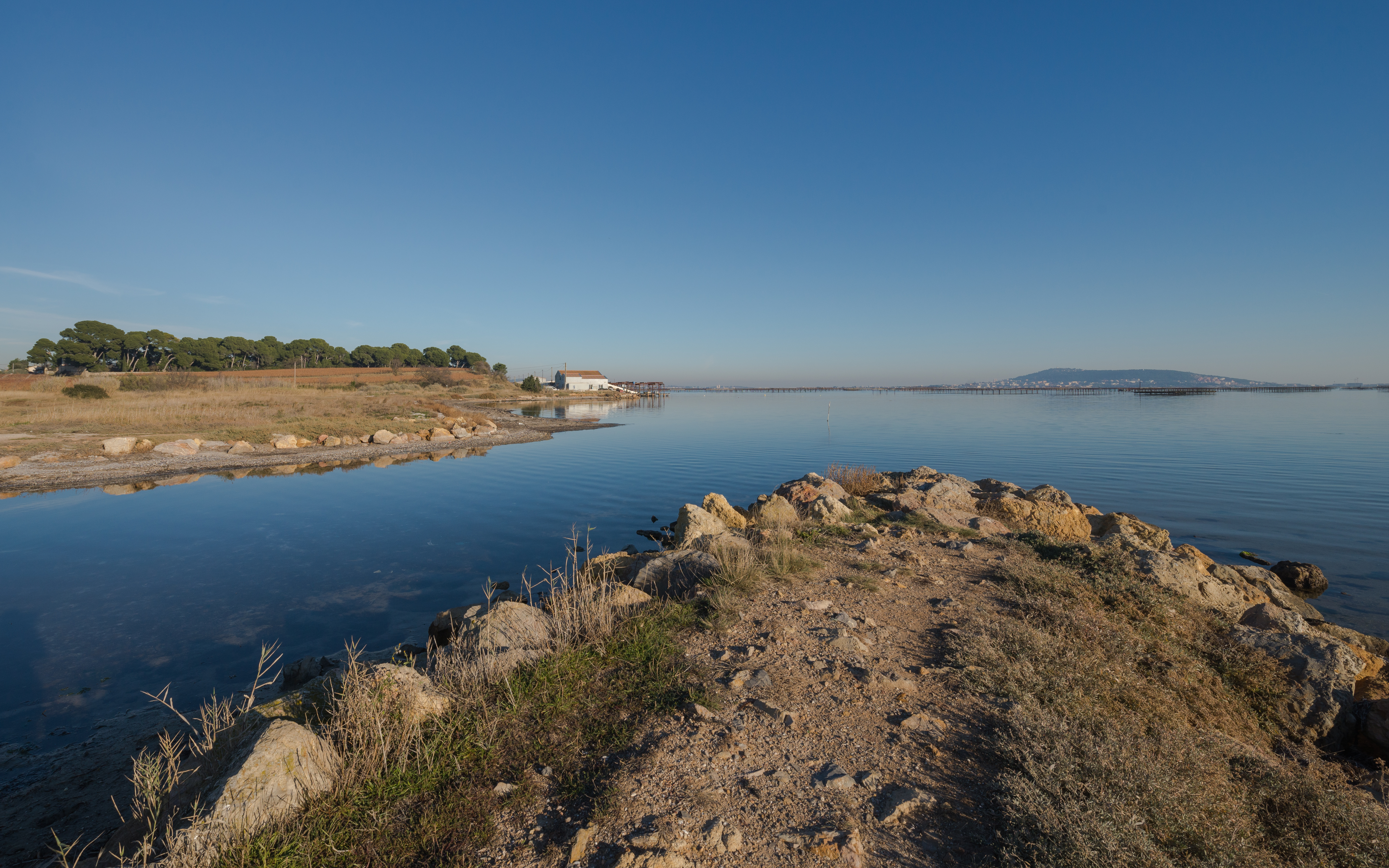
Eastern end of the communal area.

Situated on the étang de Thau, Mèze shares with Bouzigues its historic role as the oyster capital of the area. Almost a third of its inhabitants depend on the fishing industry for their livelihood. In recent years, tourism and transport have become increasingly central to the local economy.

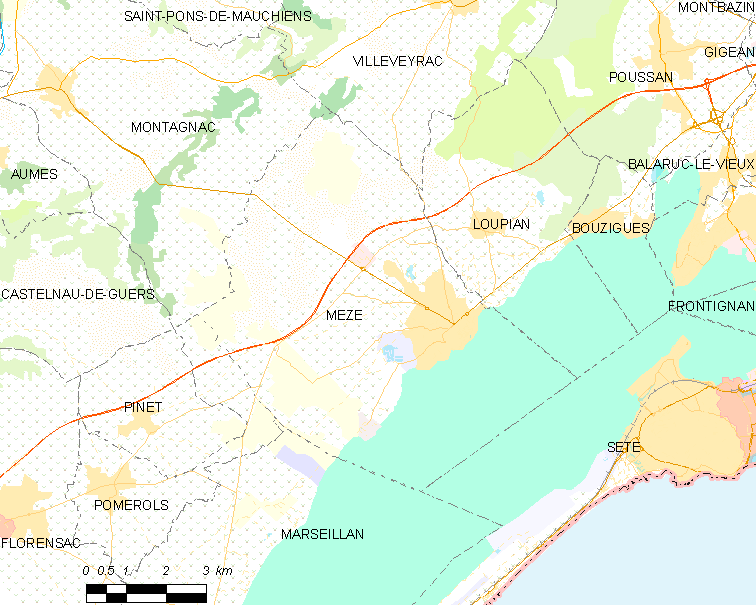
Map

== History ==
An important port since Phoenician times, Mèze has always primarily been a fishing town. During the Roman Empire, the town lay on the main Southern route from Italy to Spain - the 'Via Domitia'. The Romans brought wine to the area and left a legacy of architecture including two of the town's churches. The production of shellfish, especially oysters, has been the mainstay of the Mèze economy for almost a century and the whole Bassin de Thau area has built an international reputation for the quality of its seafood.

== Administration ==
| Term | Mayor of Mèze | Party |
|---|---|---|
| 1807–1815 | Michel Privat | |
| 1815–1817 | Charles de Borie | |
| 1817–1820 | Pierre Ronzier | |
| 1820–1828 | Louis Charamaule | |
| 1828–1840 | François Bouliech | |
| 1840–1848 | de Borie | |
| 1848-1848 | Santy | |
| 1848–1849 | Hippolyte Bouliech | |
| 1849-1849 | Frédéric de Girard | |
| 1849–1850 | Jules Molinier | |
| 1850–1851 | François Besse | |
| 1851-1851 | Sylla Lacroix | |
| 1851–1859 | Constantin Bouliech | |
| 1859–1865 | Adrien Lonjon | |
| 1865–1870 | Gustave Privat | |
| 1870–1874 | Antonin Bouliech | |
| 1874–1876 | Emile Molinier | |
| 1876-1876 | Jean-Baptiste Allègre | |
| 1876–1878 | Jean-François Besse | |
| 1878-1878 | Benjamin Durand | |
| 1878–1880 | Jean-Baptiste Allègre | |
| 1880–1882 | Emile Beaumadier | |
| 1882–1885 | Jean-Baptiste Allègre | |
| 1885-1885 | Vincent Germain | |
| 1885–1887 | Jean-Baptiste Allègre | |
| 1887–1892 | Guillaume Gros | |
| 1892–1901 | Paulin Arnaud | |
| 1901–1904 | Paul Enteric | |
| 1904–1912 | Baptiste Guitard | |
| 1912–1921 | Paul Enteric | |
| 1921–1922 | Louis Brun | |
| 1922–1923 | Camille Fraisse, Charles Poujol, François Vailhe | délégation spéciale |
| 1923–1925 | Julien Granal | |
| 1925–1941 | Méril Poujade | |
| 1941–1944 | Thomas Bessiere | délégation spéciale |
| 1944–1947 | Henri Bessède | |
| 1947–1971 | André Montet | |
| 1971–1977 | Georges Jean | |
| 1977–2001 | Yves Pietrasanta | Greens |
| 2001-2001 | Yvon Pibre | |
| 2001-2021 | Henry Fricou | Greens/Europe Écologie–The Greens |
| 2021-2026 | Thierry Baëza | Génération écologie |

== Population ==
Historical population
| Year | Pop. | ±% p.a. |
|---|---|---|
| 1968 | 5,005 | — |
| 1975 | 5,508 | +1.38% |
| 1982 | 5,742 | +0.60% |
| 1990 | 6,502 | +1.57% |
| 1999 | 7,630 | +1.79% |
| 2007 | 10,336 | +3.87% |
| 2012 | 10,917 | +1.10% |
| 2017 | 11,587 | +1.20% |
| 2023 | 12,669 | +1.50% |
Source: INSEE

== Sights ==
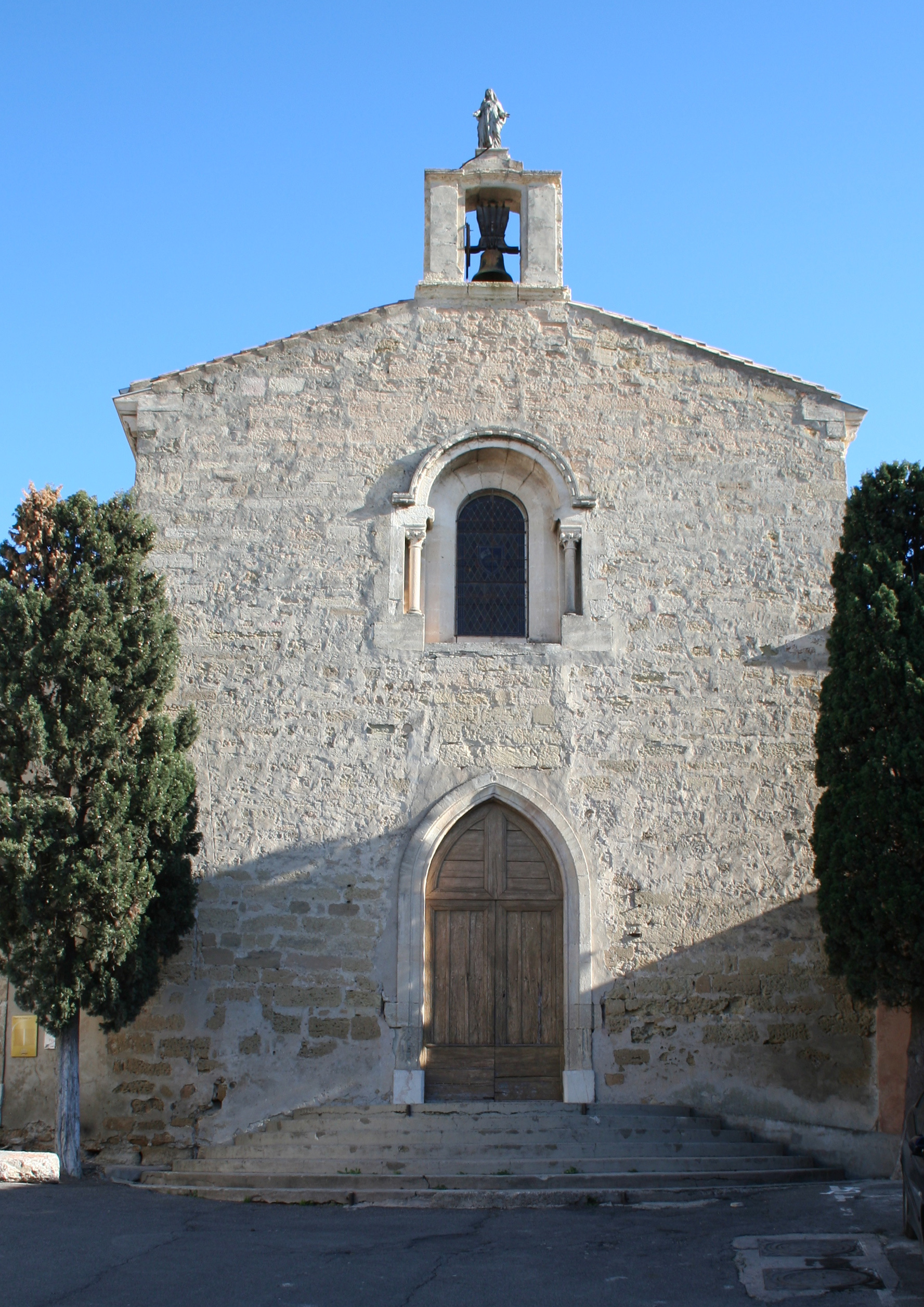
Chapelle des Pénitents.

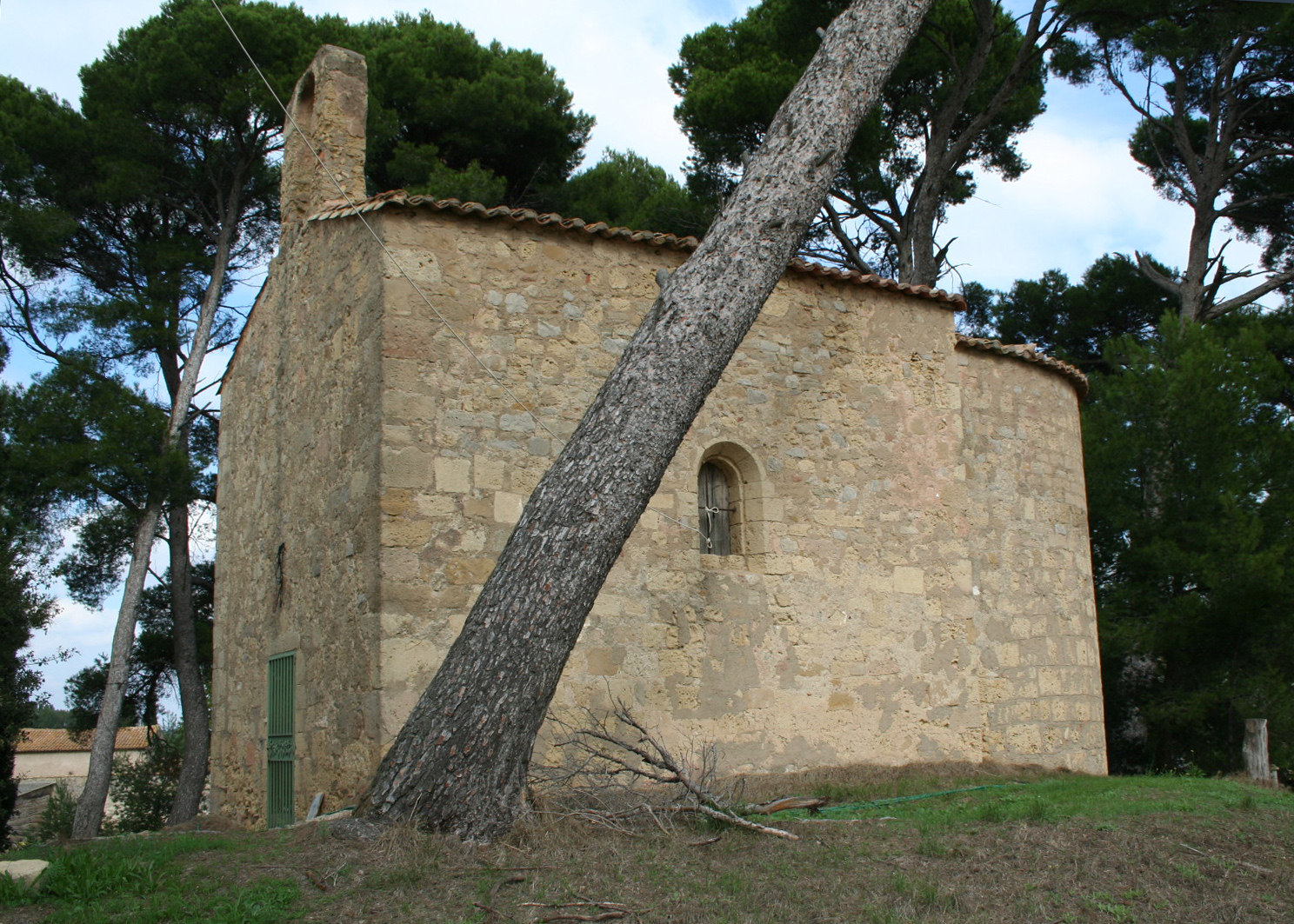
St-Jean-de-la-Garrigue - église romane.

- Old village center
- Port Mèze: both a working fishing harbor and a port for recreational boating.
- Lagunage ecological site
- Dinosaur Plain' palenthology museum.
- Eglise Saint Hilaire
- La Chapelle des Pénitents (12th century)
- Le château de Girard (end of 17th century)
- Remains of city walls
- St-Jean-de-la-Garrigue, former parish church, built in romanesque style.

== Personalities ==
- The French Arabist and historian André Miquel was born in Mèze.
- Singer Pierre Vassiliu lived for many years in Mèze.
- Singer Christian Delagrange lives in Mèze.

== Festivals ==
- Music Festival de Thau (annual),
- A festival of traditional Boat Jousting is held each summer.

== Traditions ==
- The legendary bœuf de Mèze has become the animal symbol of the town.
- The Balle au tambourin ball game.

== See also ==
- Communes of the Hérault department
