= Montbazin =

- Commune
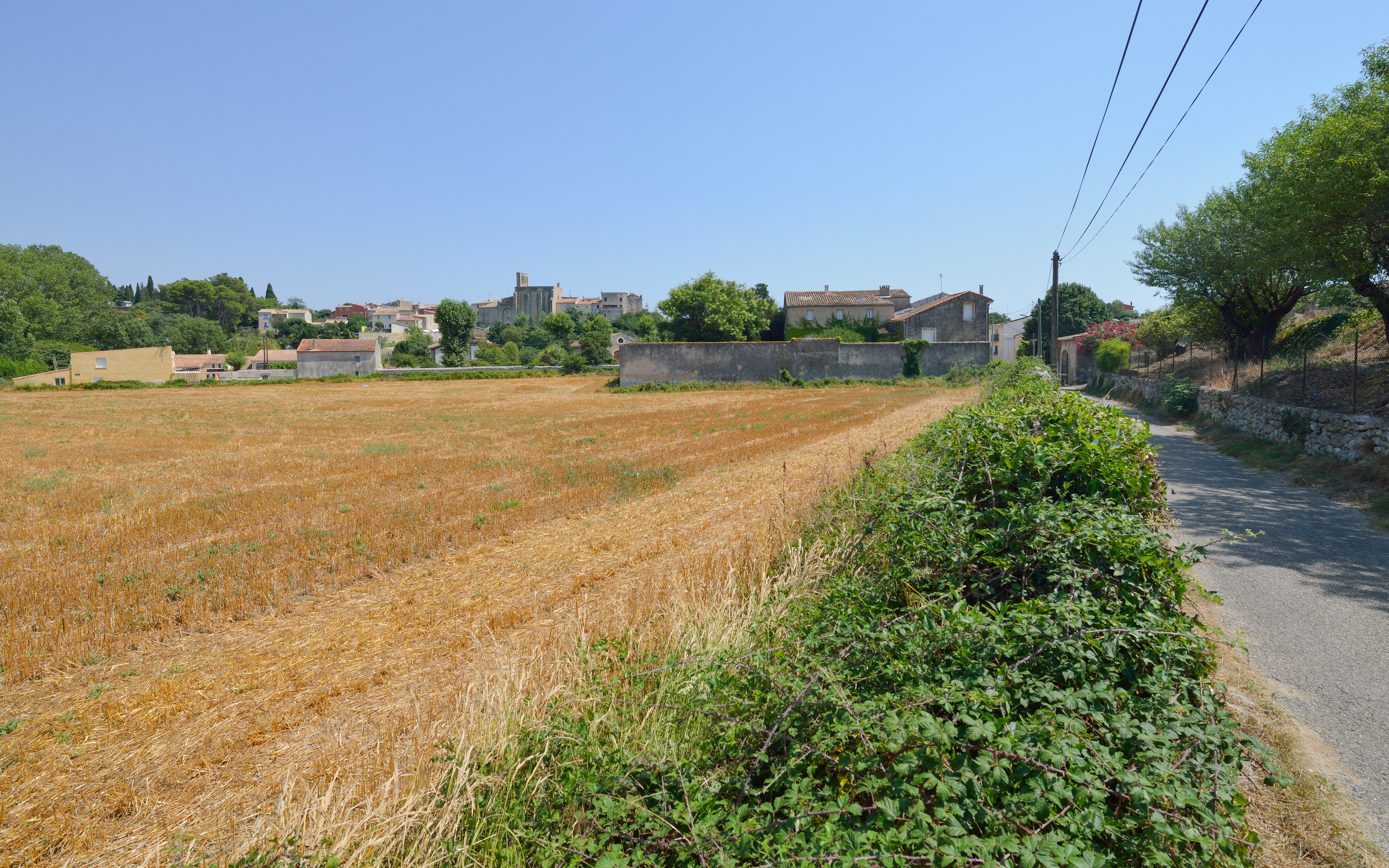
- A general view of Montbazin

- Coat of arms
- Location of Montbazin
- Location within France Location within Occitanie
- Coordinates: 43°31′00″N 3°41′48″E
- Country: France
- Region: Occitania
- Department: Hérault
- Arrondissement: Montpellier
- Canton: Mèze
- Intercommunality: CA Sète Agglopôle Méditerranée

Government
  - Mayor (2020–2026): Josian Ribes
- Area^{1}: 21.13 km^{2} (8.16 sq mi)
- Elevation: 34 m (112 ft)
- Highest elevation: 313 m (1,027 ft)
- Lowest elevation: 16 m (52 ft)
- Population (2023): 2,877
  - Density: 136.2/km^{2} (352.6/sq mi)
- Time zone: UTC+01:00 (CET)
  - Summer (DST): UTC+02:00 (CEST)
- INSEE/Postal code: 34165 /34560
- ^{1} French Land Register data, which excludes lakes, ponds, glaciers > 1 km^{2} (0.386 sq mi or 247 acres) and river estuaries.

Montbazin (French pronunciation: [mɔ̃bazɛ̃]; Occitan: Montbasin) is a commune in the Hérault department in the Occitanie region in southern France. It is part of the agglomeration of Sète. In Roman times it was an important stopover on the road from Narbonne to Rome.

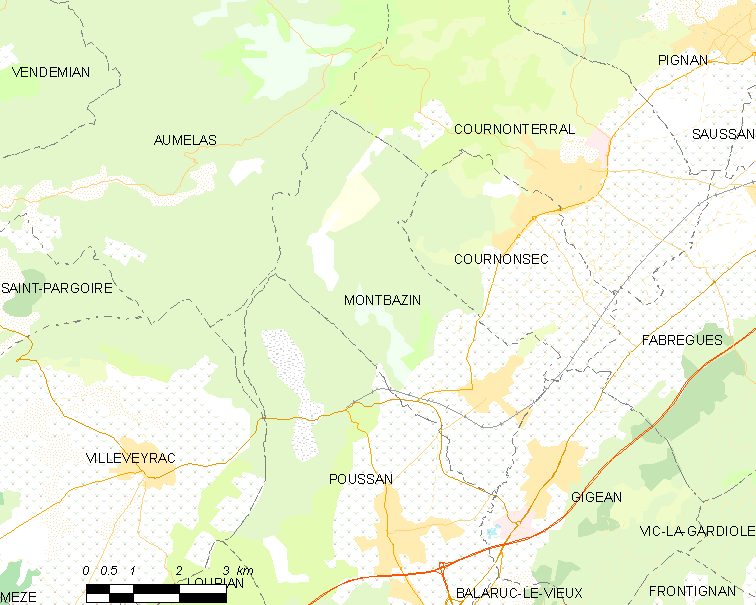
Map

== Population ==
Its inhabitants are referred to as Montbazinois.

Historical population
Year	Pop.	±% p.a.
1968	1,041	—
1975	1,109	+0.91%
1982	1,377	+3.14%
1990	2,062	+5.18%
1999	2,214	+0.79%
2007	2,779	+2.88%
2012	2,927	+1.04%
2017	2,952	+0.17%
2023	2,877	−0.43%
Source: INSEE

== Administration ==
Mayor of Montbazin	Elected	Party
Joseph Roussel	1788-1790	
Albert David	1923-1944	
Lucien Labit	1995-2001	
Jean-Marc Baillon	2001-2006	
Laure Tondon	March 2006	PS
Josian Ribes	May 2020	IP

== Gallery ==
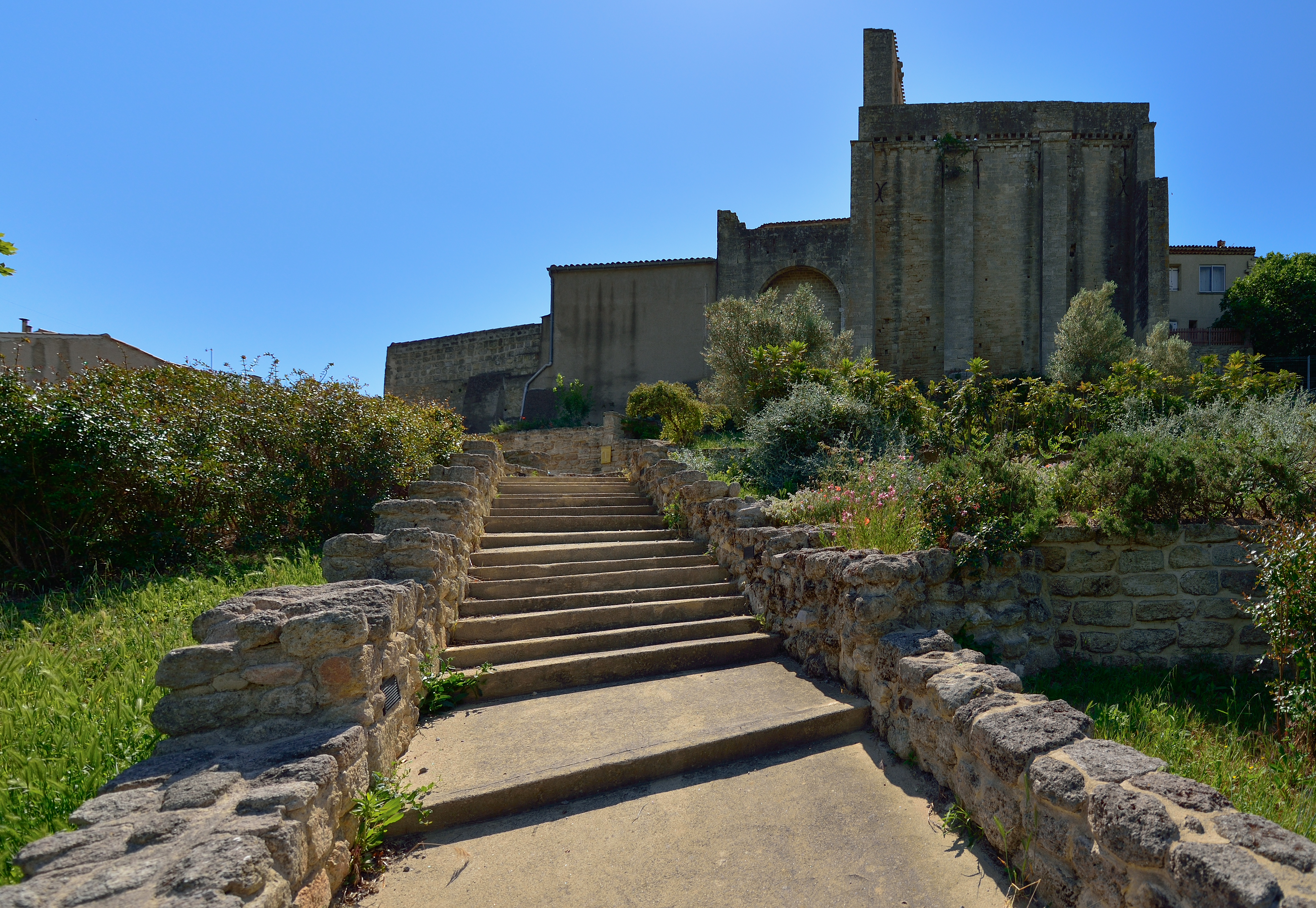
Chapelle Saint-Pierre

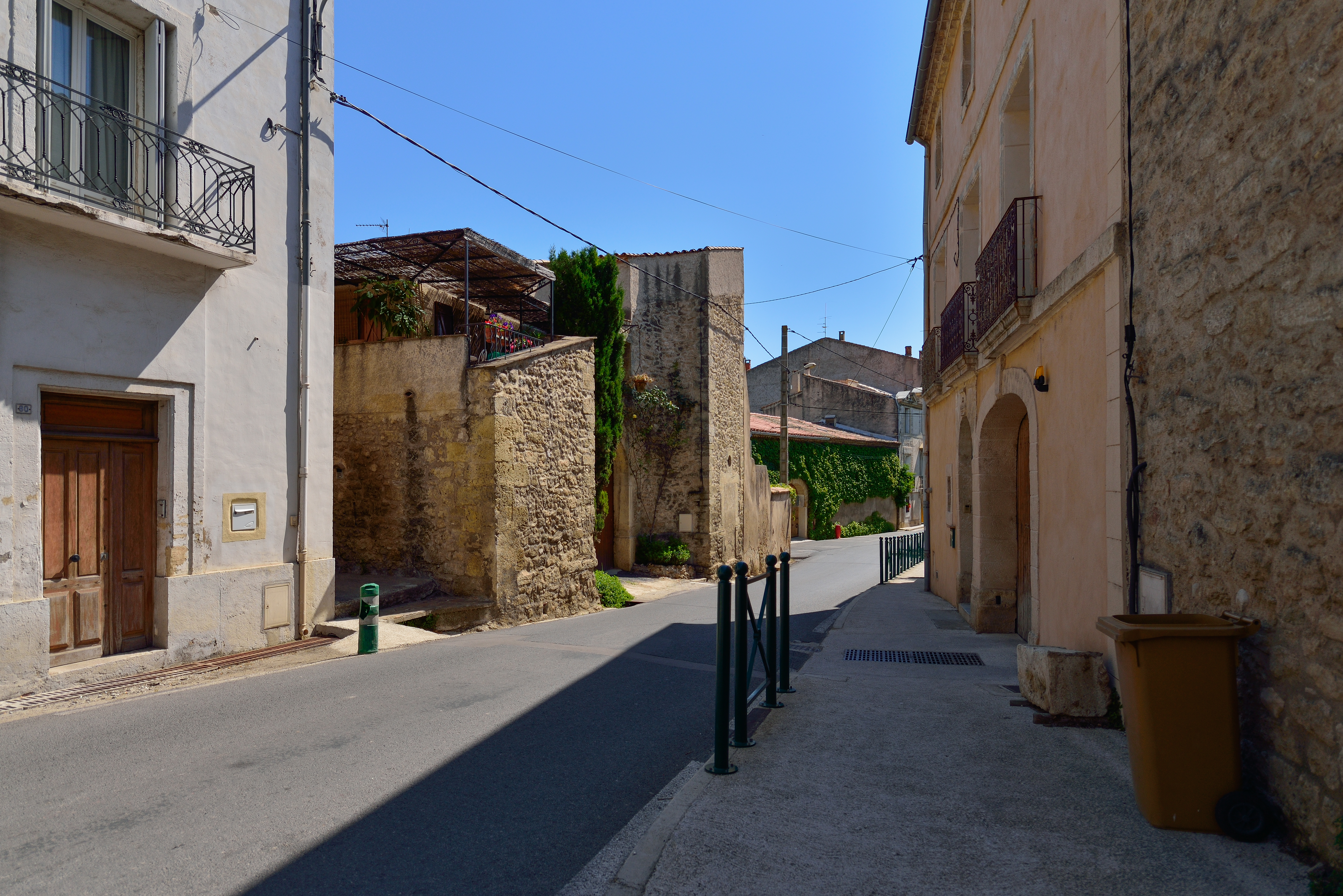
A street in the village

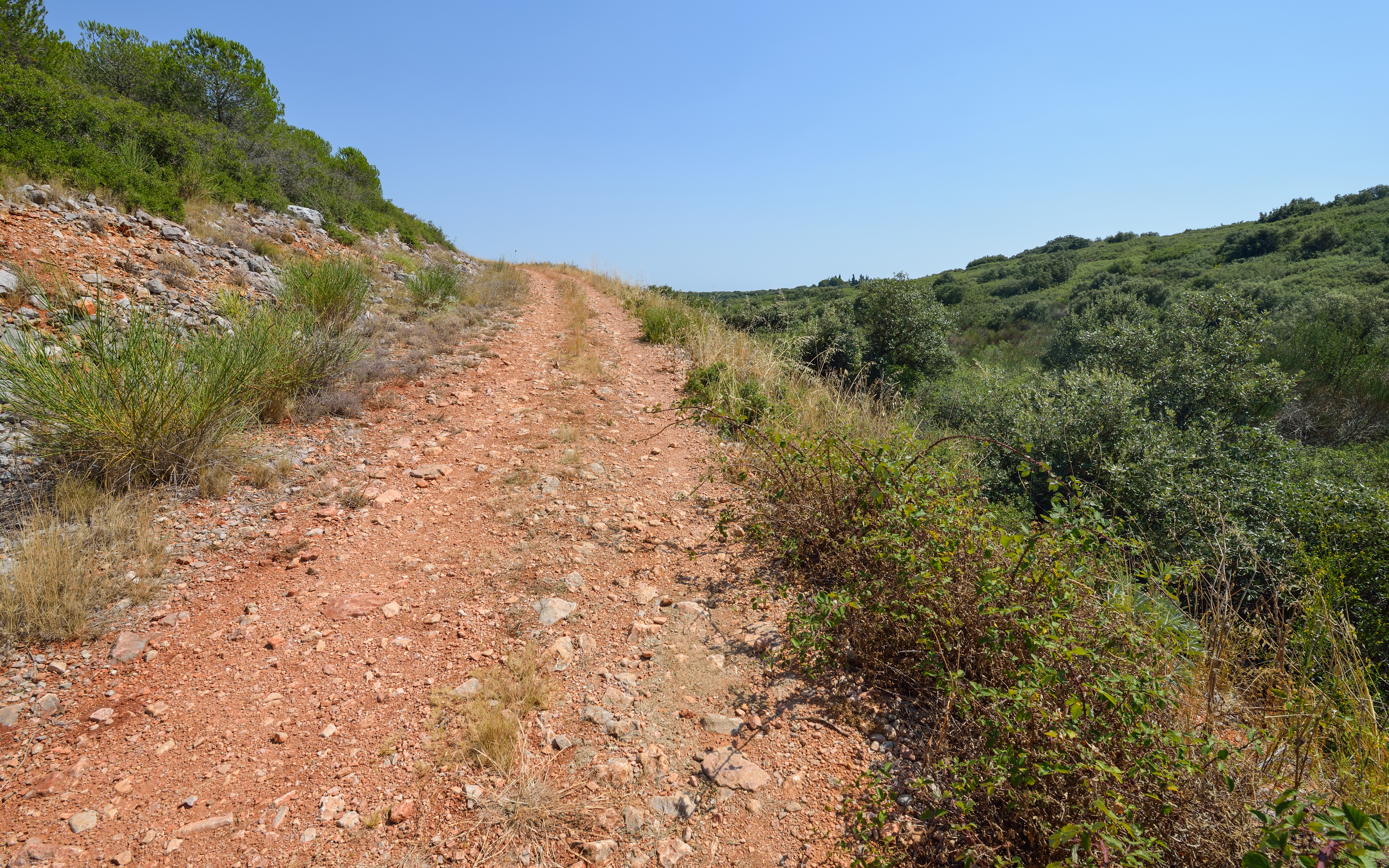
Trail in the garrigue on the Moure Hills

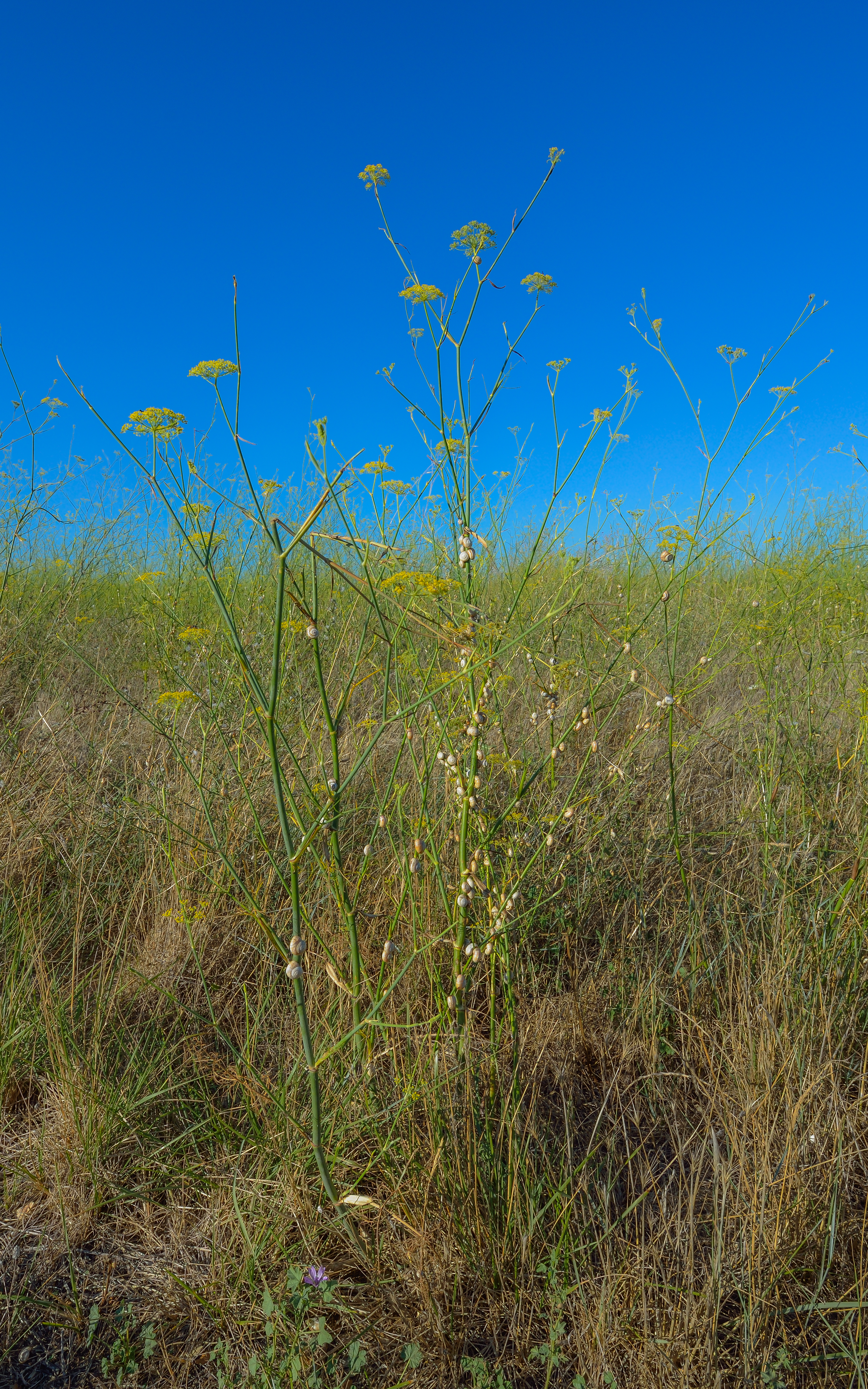
Colonies of sand hill snails

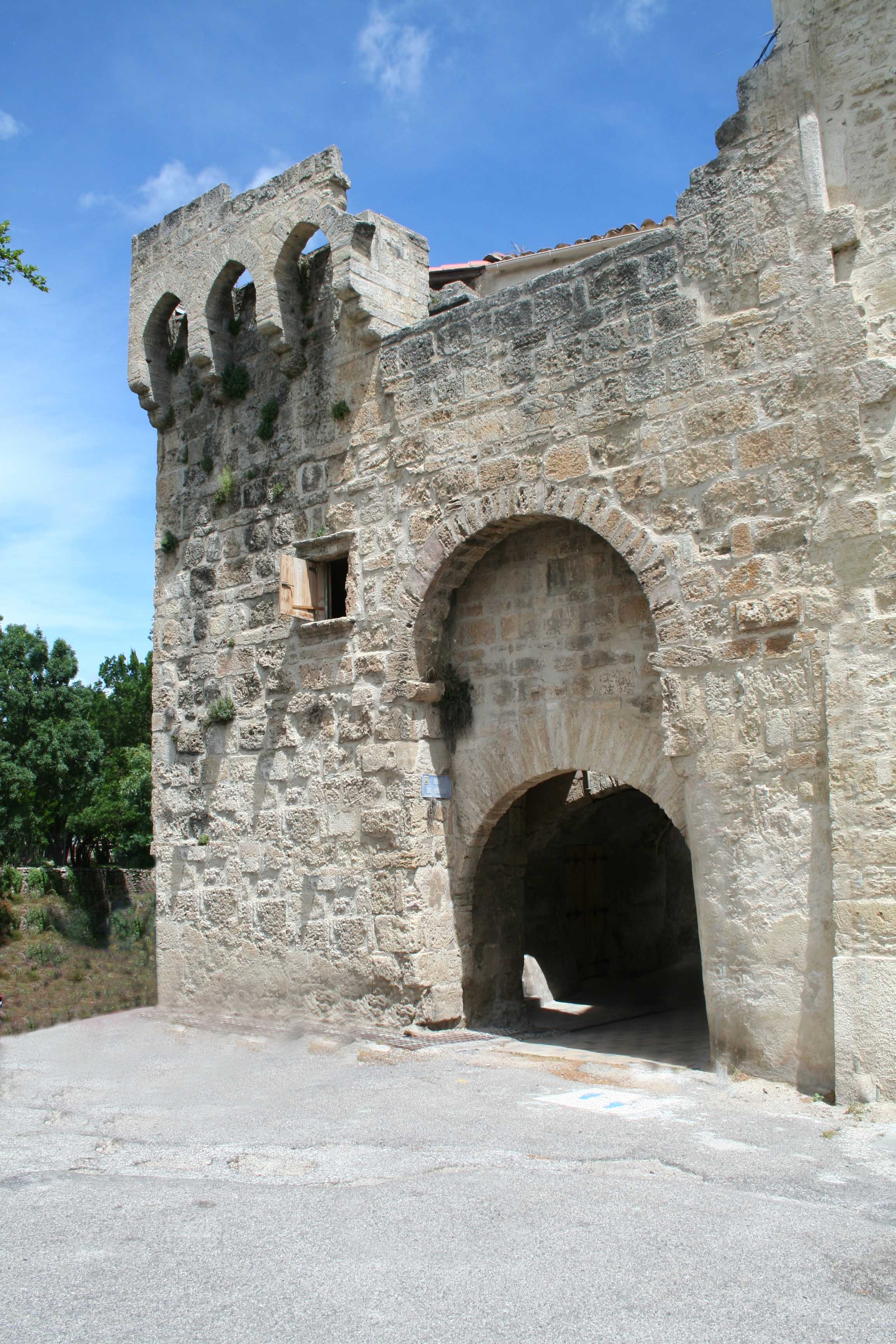
Gate in the fortification

== Personalities linked to the municipality ==
- Pierre-Paul Poulalion, known as the “poète boiteux”, born in Montbazin on 29 June 1801, poet and writer.^{2}
- Eugène Montel, born in Montbazin on 5 June 1885, teacher, journalist and politician.
- Jocelyne Carmichael, born in Paris on 13 February 1935 and died in Montbazin on 9 November 2017, poet, writer, director, French actress and activist for women's rights.^{3}
- Pierre Mariétan, born in Monthey, Switzerland on 23 September 1935, lives in Montbazin. Composer and teacher.

== See also ==
- Communes of the Hérault department

== Bibliography ==
- Jacky David, mémoire et images d'un village du midi de la France : [volume I], Frontignan, Impr. Soulié, 1996, 139 p.
- Jacky David, mémoire et images d'un village du midi de la France : [volume II], Frontignan, Impr. Soulié, 2012, 374 p.
