= Villeveyrac =

- Commune
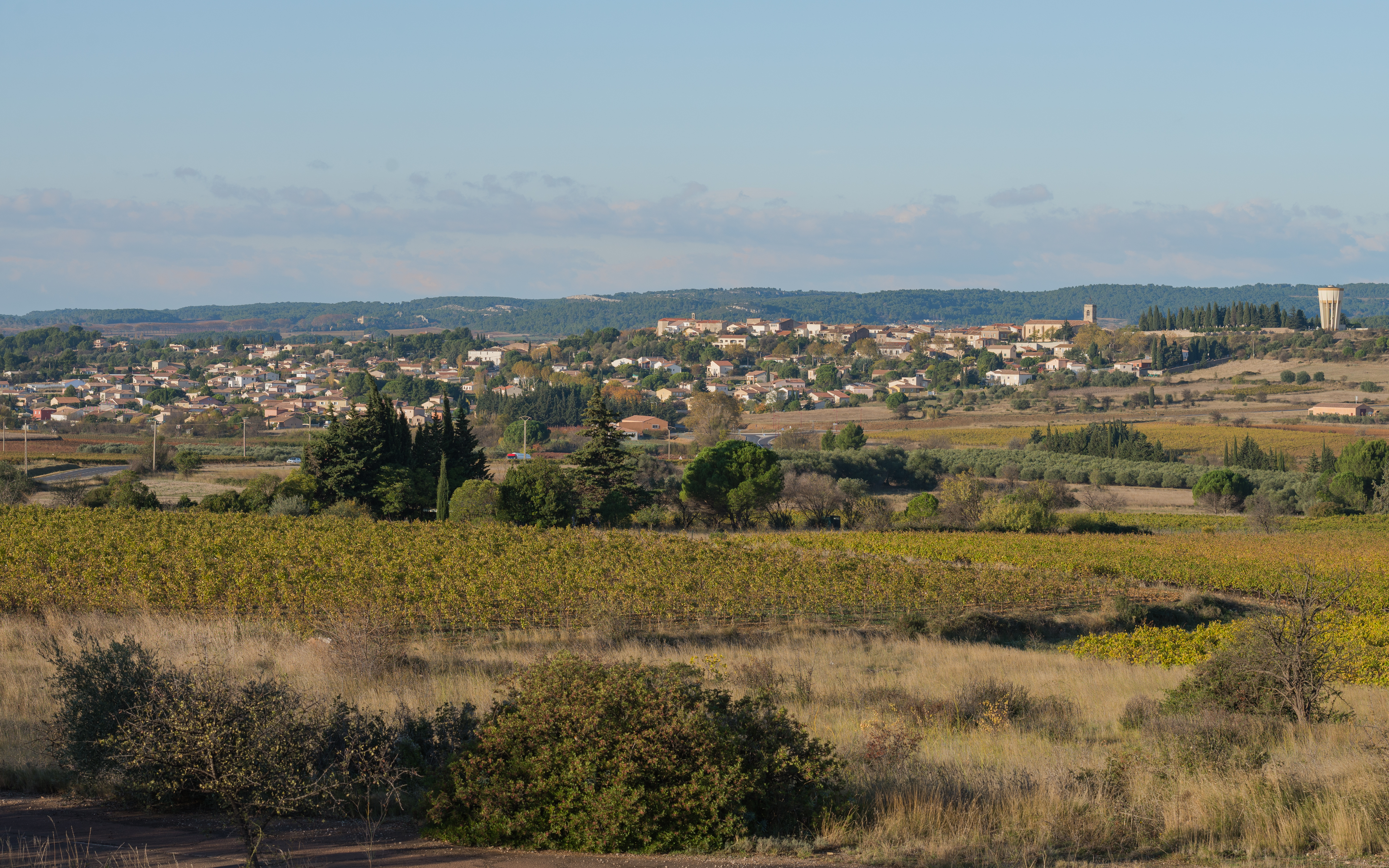
- A general view of Villeveyrac

- Coat of arms
- Location of Villeveyrac
- Location within France Location within Occitanie
- Coordinates: 43°30′07″N 3°36′29″E
- Country: France
- Region: Occitania
- Department: Hérault
- Arrondissement: Montpellier
- Canton: Mèze
- Intercommunality: CA Sète Agglopôle Méditerranée

Government
  - Mayor (2020–2026): Christophe Morgo
- Area^{1}: 37.12 km^{2} (14.33 sq mi)
- Elevation: 75 m (246 ft)
- Highest elevation: 255 m (837 ft)
- Lowest elevation: 12 m (39 ft)
- Population (2023): 3,972
  - Density: 107.0/km^{2} (277.1/sq mi)
- Time zone: UTC+01:00 (CET)
  - Summer (DST): UTC+02:00 (CEST)
- INSEE/Postal code: 34341 /34560
- ^{1} French Land Register data, which excludes lakes, ponds, glaciers > 1 km^{2} (0.386 sq mi or 247 acres) and river estuaries.

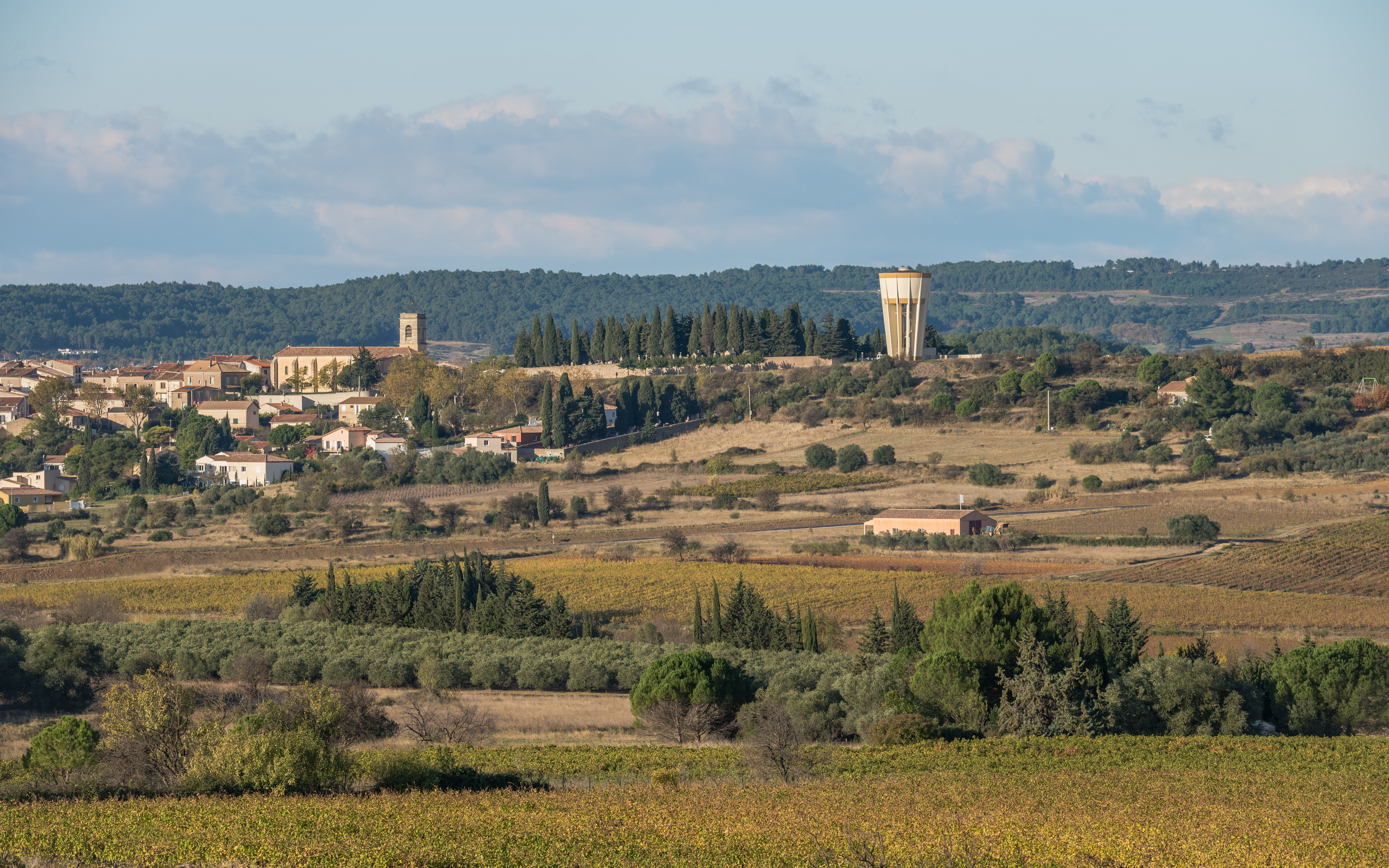
The church and the water tower.

Villeveyrac (French pronunciation: [vilveʁak]; Occitan: Vilamanda) is a commune in the Hérault department in the Occitanie region in southern France.

== Population ==
Historical population
Year	Pop.	±% p.a.
1968	1,609	—
1975	1,618	+0.08%
1982	1,686	+0.59%
1990	1,842	+1.11%
1999	2,211	+2.05%
2007	2,836	+3.16%
2012	3,536	+4.51%
2017	3,795	+1.42%
2023	3,972	+0.76%
Source: INSEE

== See also ==
- Communes of the Hérault department
