= Poussan =

- Commune
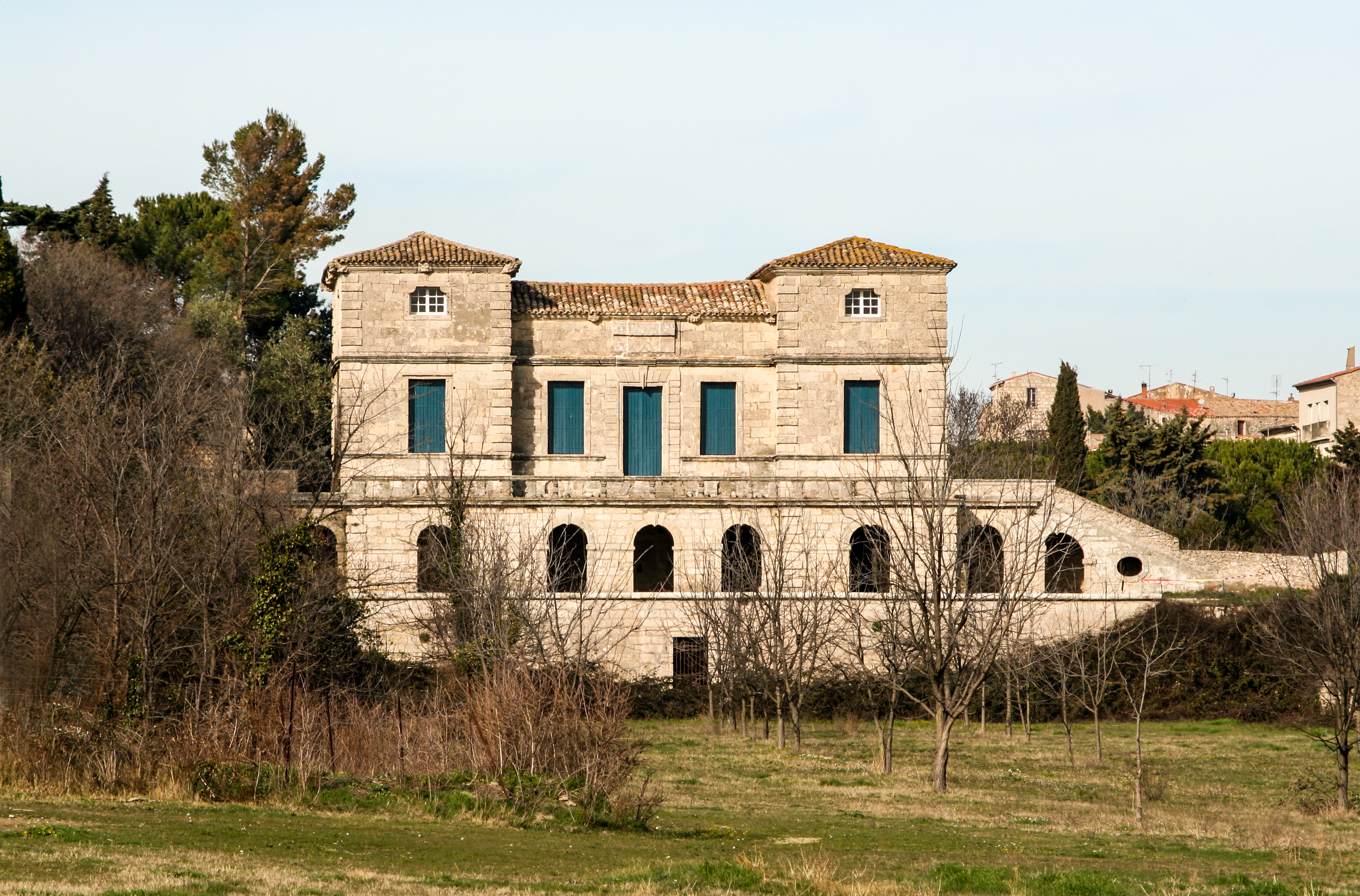
- Castle

- Coat of arms
- Location of Poussan
- Location within France Location within Occitanie
- Coordinates: 43°29′22″N 3°40′15″E
- Country: France
- Region: Occitania
- Department: Hérault
- Arrondissement: Montpellier
- Canton: Mèze
- Intercommunality: CA Sète Agglopôle Méditerranée

Government
  - Mayor (2020–2026): Florence Sanchez
- Area^{1}: 30.08 km^{2} (11.61 sq mi)
- Elevation: 2 m (6.6 ft)
- Highest elevation: 286 m (938 ft)
- Lowest elevation: 0 m (0 ft)
- Population (2023): 6,797
  - Density: 226.0/km^{2} (585.2/sq mi)
- Time zone: UTC+01:00 (CET)
  - Summer (DST): UTC+02:00 (CEST)
- INSEE/Postal code: 34213 /34560
- ^{1} French Land Register data, which excludes lakes, ponds, glaciers > 1 km^{2} (0.386 sq mi or 247 acres) and river estuaries.

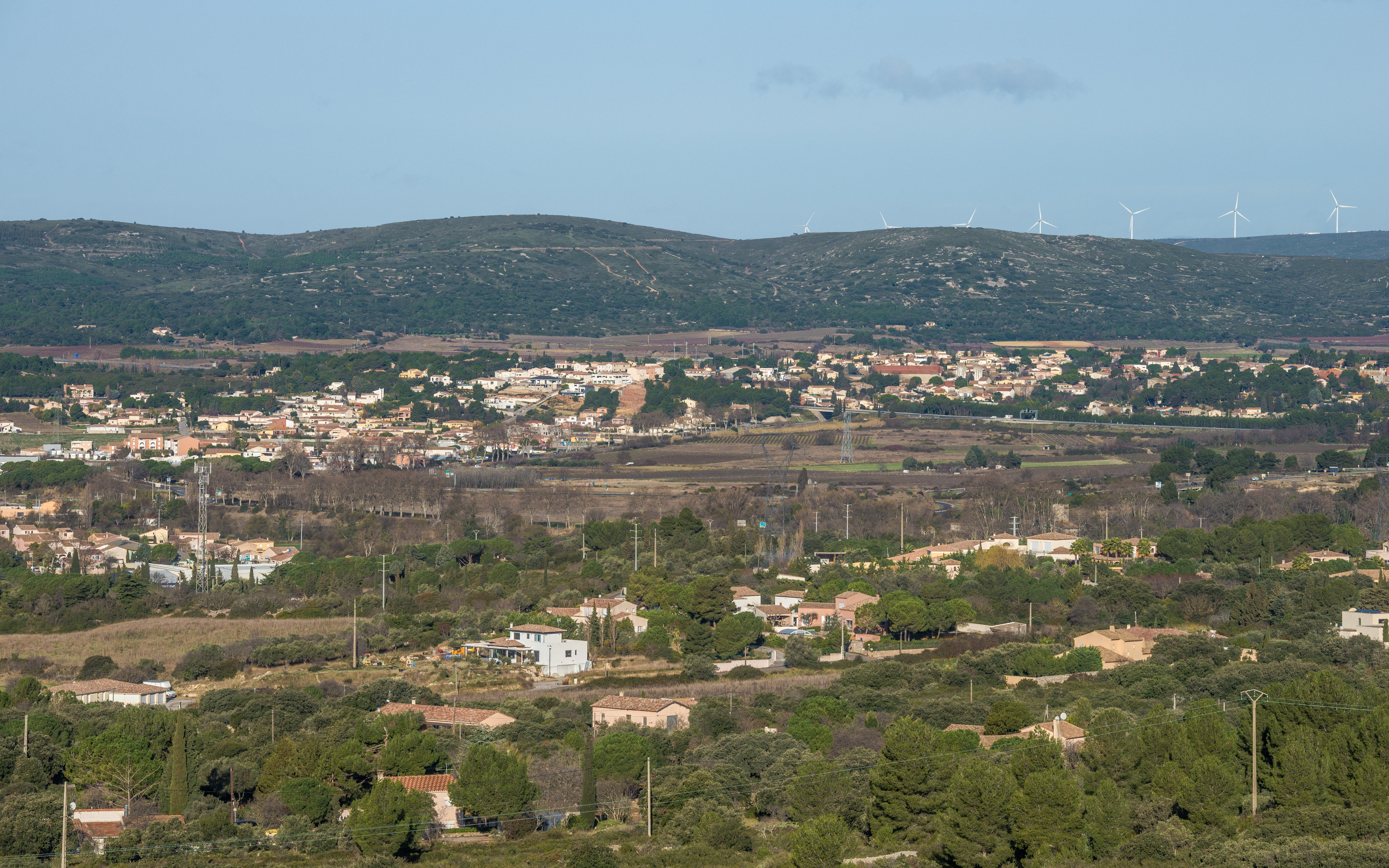
General view from southeast.

Poussan (French pronunciation: [pusɑ̃]; Occitan: Poçan) is a commune in the Hérault department in the Occitanie region in southern France.

== Population ==
Historical population

Year	Pop.	±% p.a.
1793	1,319	—
1800	1,483	+1.69%
1806	1,649	+1.78%
1821	1,764	+0.45%
1831	1,916	+0.83%
1836	1,827	−0.95%
1841	1,931	+1.11%
1846	1,986	+0.56%
1851	1,990	+0.04%
1856	1,959	−0.31%
1861	2,066	+1.07%
1866	2,245	+1.68%
1872	2,261	+0.12%
1876	2,333	+0.79%
1881	1,958	−3.44%
1886	1,910	−0.50%
1891	2,055	+1.47%
1896	2,313	+2.39%
1901	2,416	+0.88%

Year	Pop.	±% p.a.
1906	2,226	−1.62%
1911	2,046	−1.67%
1921	2,067	+0.10%
1926	1,943	−1.23%
1931	1,911	−0.33%
1936	1,753	−1.71%
1946	1,430	−2.02%
1954	1,568	+1.16%
1962	1,625	+0.45%
1968	1,894	+2.59%
1975	2,103	+1.51%
1982	2,728	+3.79%
1990	3,505	+3.18%
1999	4,044	+1.60%
2007	4,644	+1.74%
2012	5,811	+4.59%
2017	5,972	+0.55%
2023	6,797	+2.18%

Source: EHESS and INSEE (1968-2023)

== See also ==
- Communes of the Hérault department
