= Loupian =

- Commune
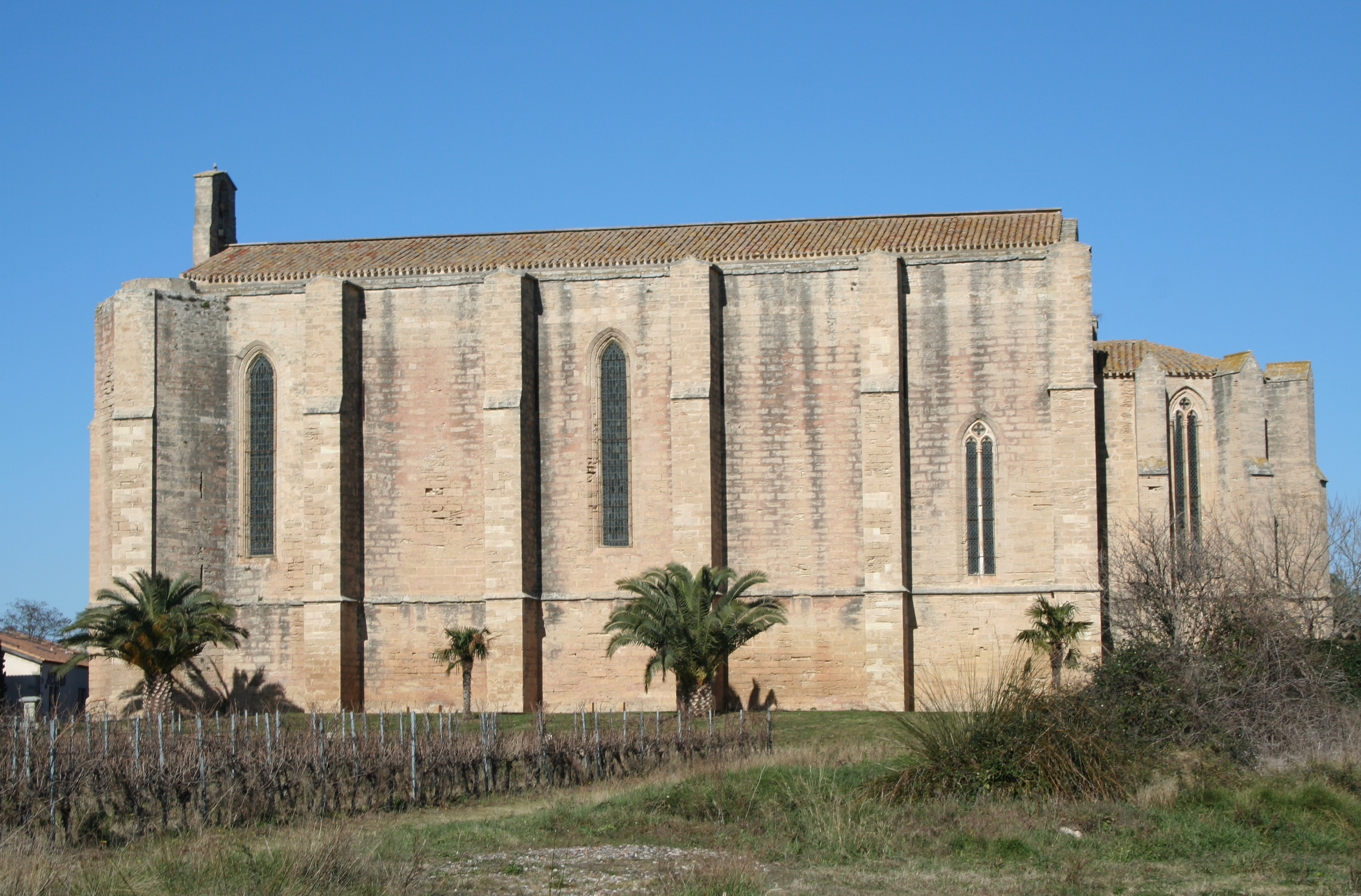
- Church of Sainte-Cécile

- Coat of arms
- Location of Loupian
- Location within France Location within Occitanie
- Coordinates: 43°27′03″N 3°36′52″E
- Country: France
- Region: Occitania
- Department: Hérault
- Arrondissement: Montpellier
- Canton: Mèze
- Intercommunality: CA Sète Agglopôle Méditerranée

Government
  - Mayor (2020–2026): Alain Vidal
- Area^{1}: 16.00 km^{2} (6.18 sq mi)
- Elevation: 2 m (6.6 ft)
- Highest elevation: 170 m (560 ft)
- Lowest elevation: 0 m (0 ft)
- Population (2023): 2,169
  - Density: 135.6/km^{2} (351.1/sq mi)
- Time zone: UTC+01:00 (CET)
  - Summer (DST): UTC+02:00 (CEST)
- INSEE/Postal code: 34143 /34140
- ^{1} French Land Register data, which excludes lakes, ponds, glaciers > 1 km^{2} (0.386 sq mi or 247 acres) and river estuaries.

Loupian (French pronunciation: [lupjɑ̃]; Occitan: Lopian) is a commune in the Hérault département in southern France.

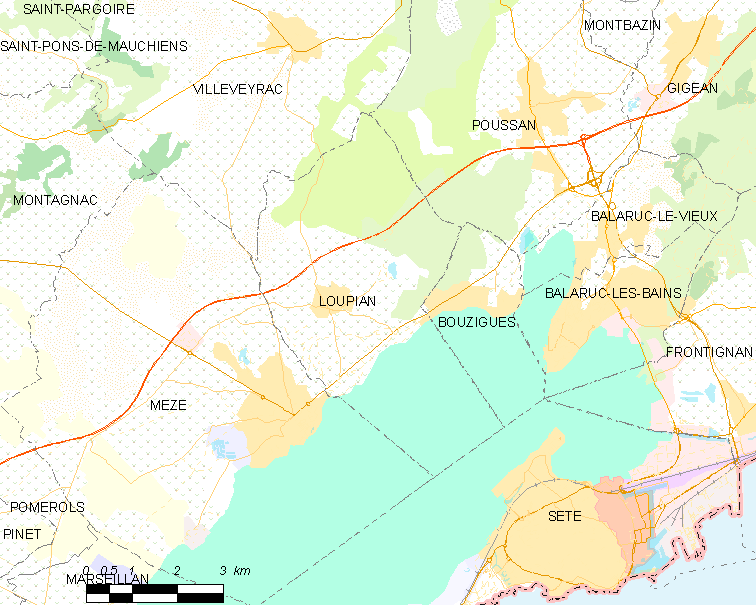
Map

== Population ==
Historical population
Year	Pop.	±% p.a.
1968	901	—
1975	934	+0.52%
1982	1,113	+2.54%
1990	1,289	+1.85%
1999	1,483	+1.57%
2007	2,081	+4.33%
2012	2,141	+0.57%
2017	2,160	+0.18%
2023	2,169	+0.07%
Source: INSEE

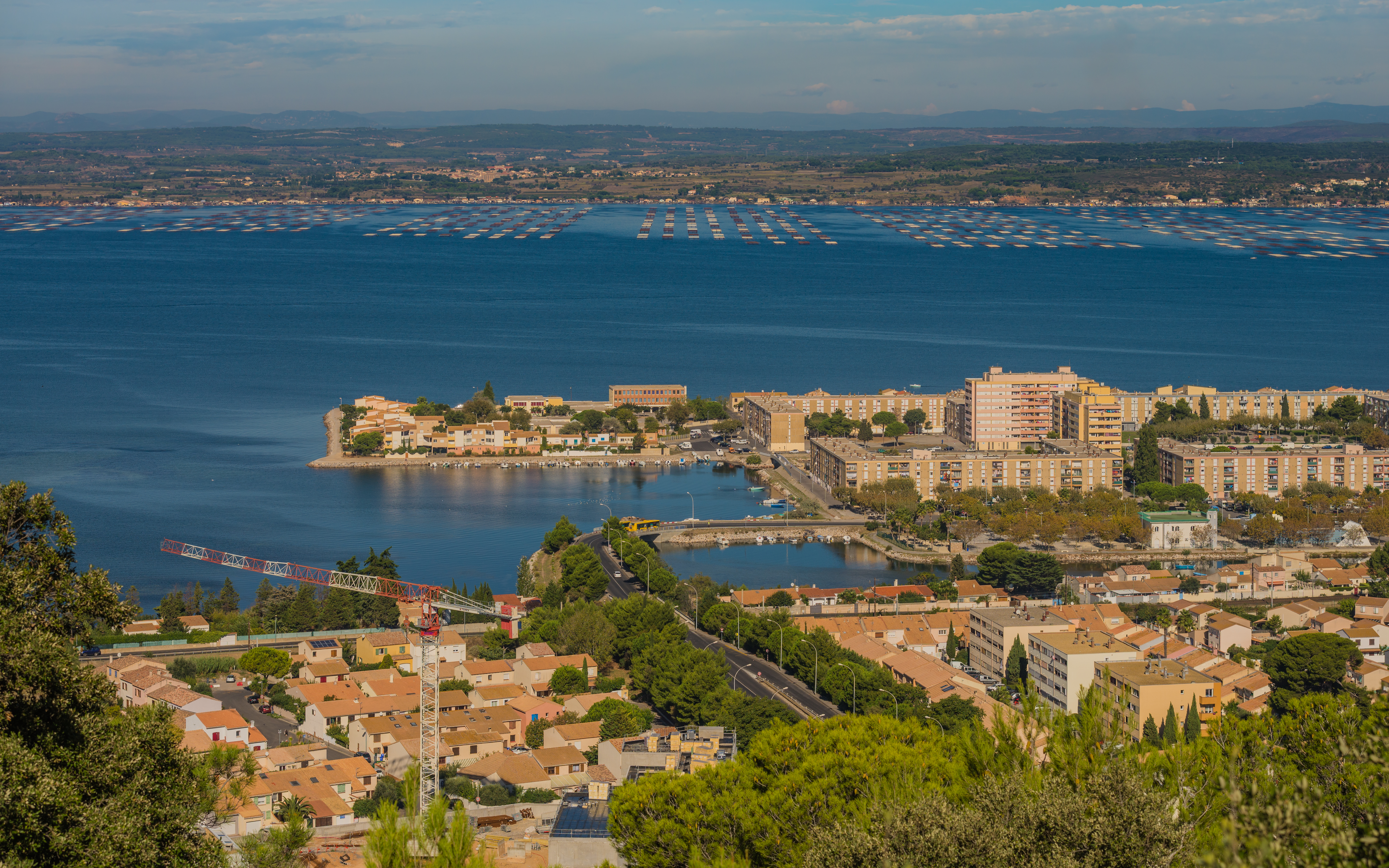
Loupian and the Étang de Thau from Sète.

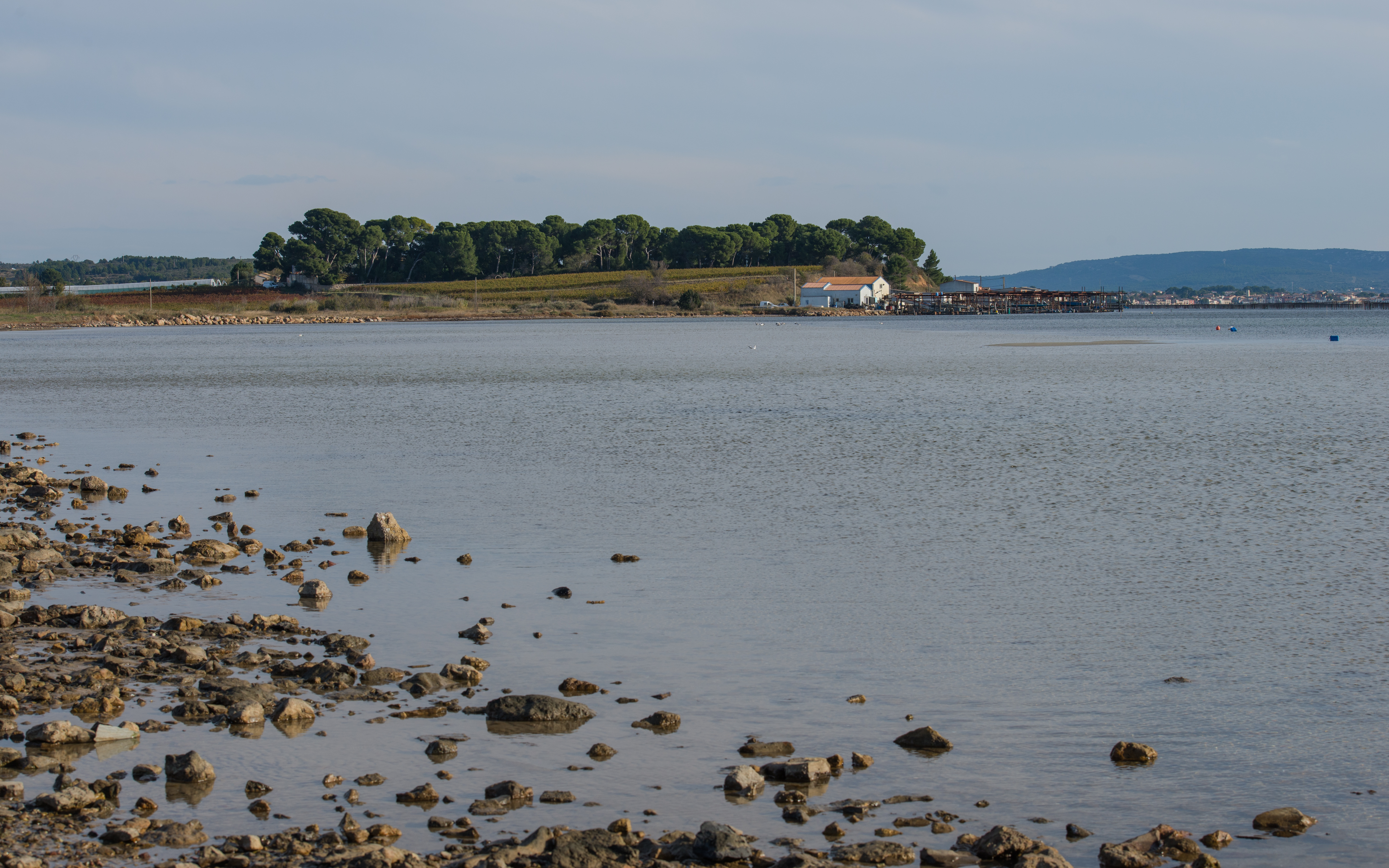
"Saint-Félix" and the Étang de Thau.

== See also ==
- Loupian Roman villa
- Étang de Thau
- Communes of the Hérault department
