= Bouzigues =

- Commune
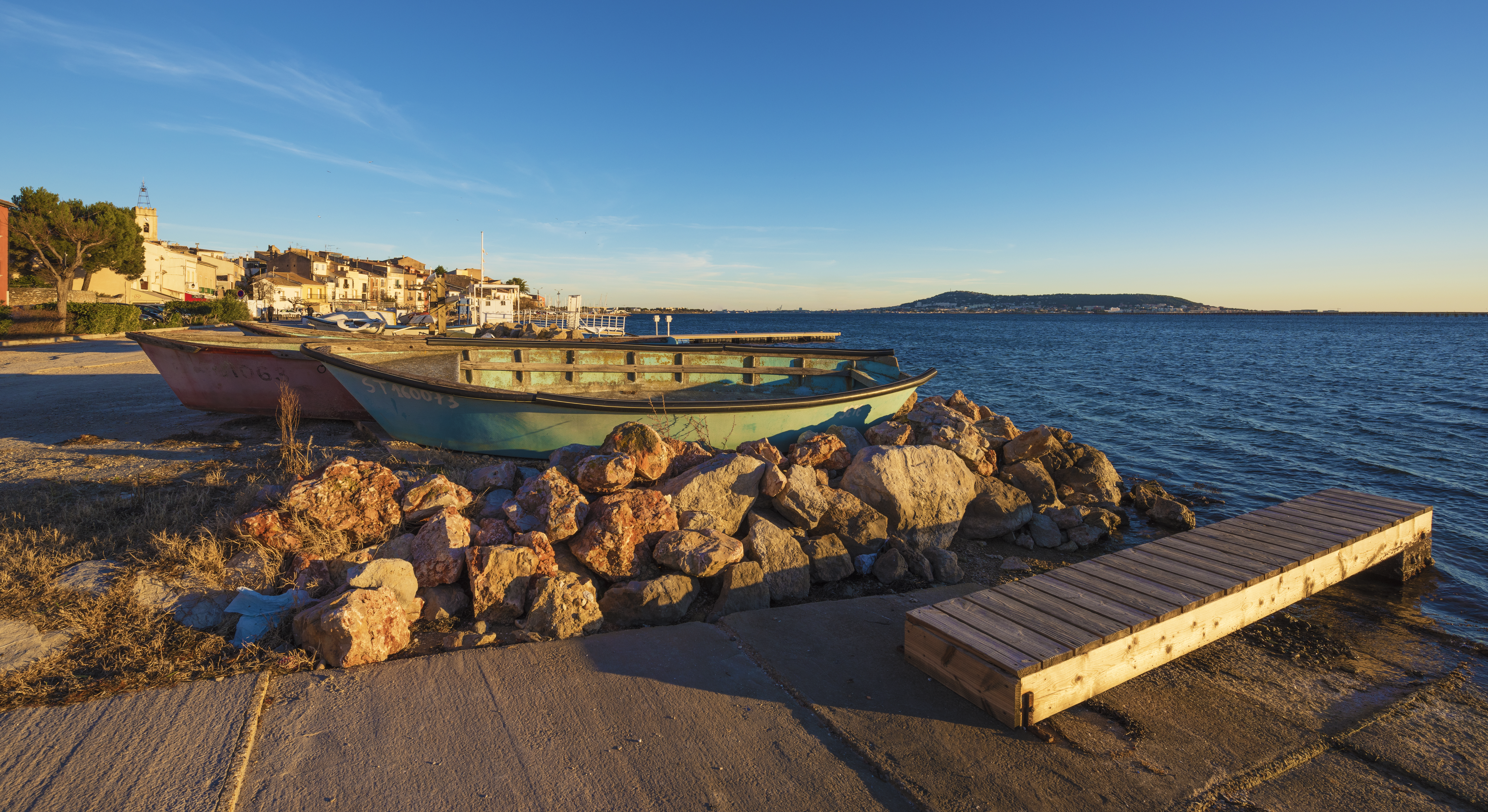
- Shore of the Étang de Thau

- Coat of arms
- Location of Bouzigues
- Location within France Location within Occitanie
- Coordinates: 43°26′57″N 3°39′32″E
- Country: France
- Region: Occitania
- Department: Hérault
- Arrondissement: Montpellier
- Canton: Mèze
- Intercommunality: CA Sète Agglopôle Méditerranée

Government
  - Mayor (2020–2026): Cédric Raja
- Area^{1}: 3.05 km^{2} (1.18 sq mi)
- Elevation: 5 m (16 ft)
- Highest elevation: 61 m (200 ft)
- Lowest elevation: 0 m (0 ft)
- Population (2023): 1,601
  - Density: 525/km^{2} (1,360/sq mi)
- Time zone: UTC+01:00 (CET)
  - Summer (DST): UTC+02:00 (CEST)
- INSEE/Postal code: 34039 /34140
- ^{1} French Land Register data, which excludes lakes, ponds, glaciers > 1 km^{2} (0.386 sq mi or 247 acres) and river estuaries.

Bouzigues (French pronunciation: [buziɡ]; Bosigas in Occitan) is a commune in the Hérault department in southern France.

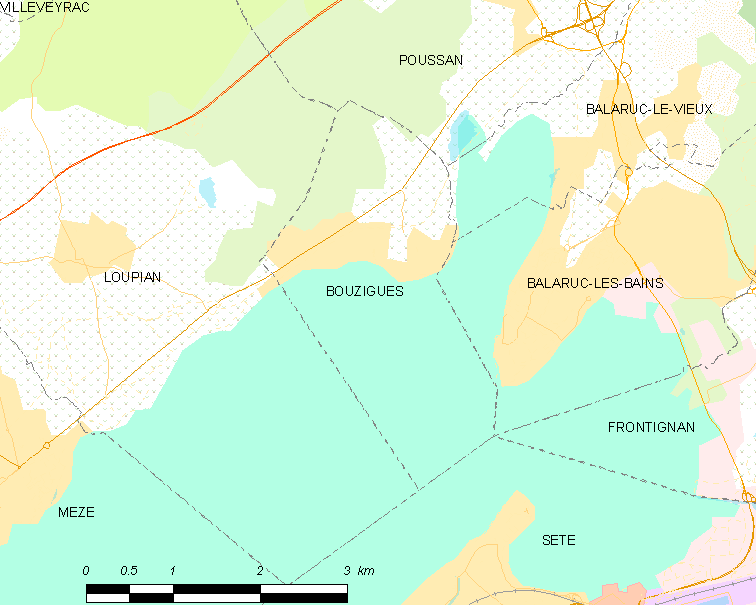
Map

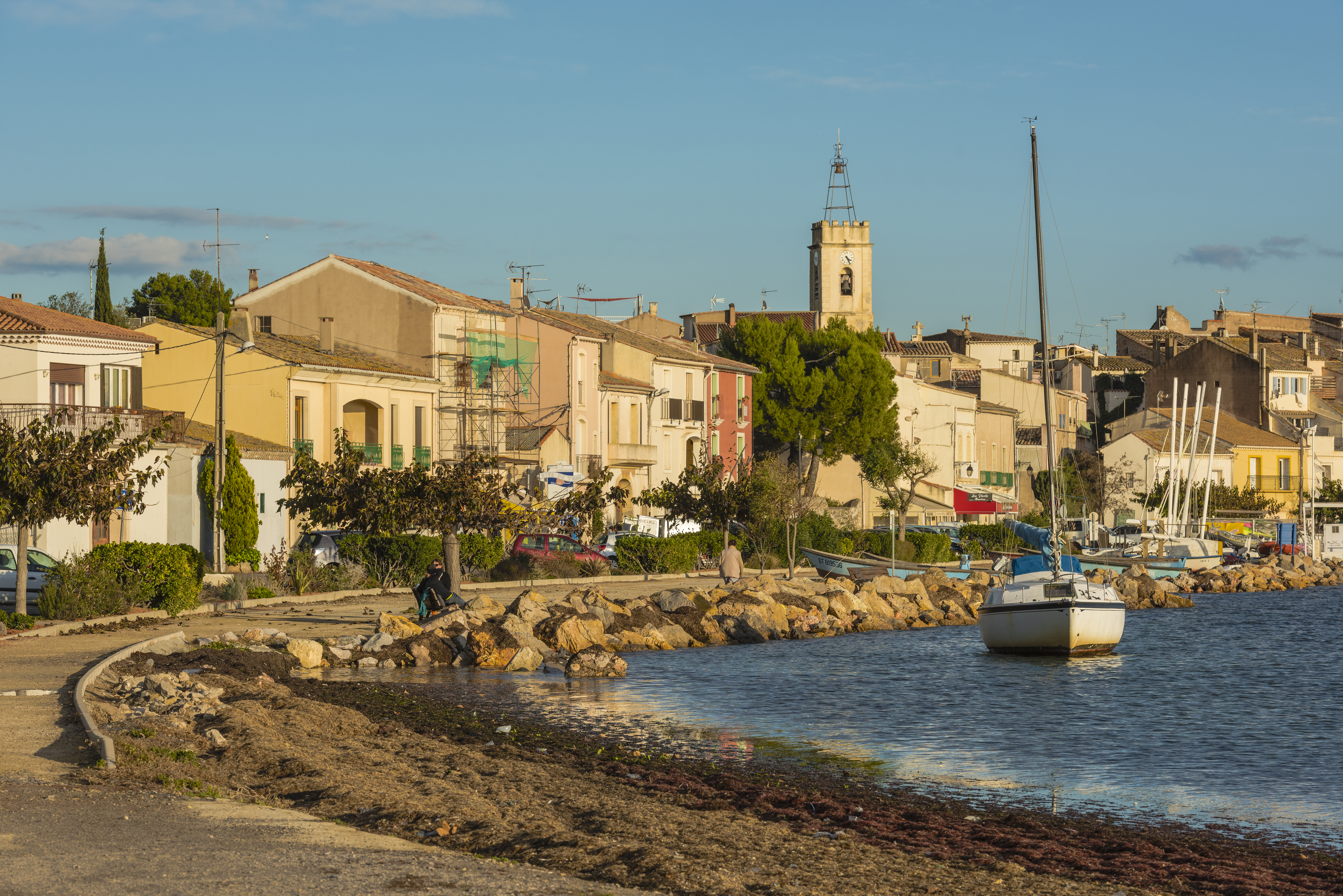
The village and the Étang de Thau

== Population ==
Historical population
Year	Pop.	±% p.a.
1968	830	—
1975	904	+1.23%
1982	945	+0.64%
1990	907	−0.51%
1999	1,208	+3.24%
2007	1,522	+2.93%
2012	1,724	+2.52%
2017	1,655	−0.81%
2023	1,601	−0.55%
Source: INSEE

== See also ==
- Communes of the Hérault department
- Étang de Thau
