= Results of the 2024 French legislative election in Hérault =

Following the first round of the 2024 French legislative election on 30 June 2024, runoff elections in each constituency where no candidate received a vote share greater than 50 percent were scheduled for 7 July. Candidates permitted to stand in the runoff elections needed to either come in first or second place in the first round or achieve more than 12.5 percent of the votes of the entire electorate (as opposed to 12.5 percent of the vote share due to low turnout).

== Hérault ==
=== 1st constituency ===
Candidate	Party or alliance		First round		Second round	
Candidate	Party or alliance		Votes	%	Votes	%
Josyan Oliva	Union of the far right	The Republicans	20,891	34.11	25,868	44.81
Jean-Louis Roumegas	New Popular Front	The Ecologists	20,851	34.04	31,864	55.19
Patricia Miralles	Ensemble	Renaissance	13,806	22.54		
Eric Chaveroche	The Republicans		2,626	4.29		
Stéphanie Lévy	Miscellaneous right	Ecologists	1,479	2.41		
Alexandre Arguel	Reconquête		1,104	1.80		
Morgane Lachiver	Far-left	Lutte Ouvrière	491	0.80		
Total			61,248	100.00	57,732	100.00
Valid votes			61,248	97.82	57,732	92.82
Invalid votes			339	0.54	934	1.50
Blank votes			1,024	1.64	3,534	5.68
Total votes			62,611	100.00	62,200	100.00
Registered voters/turnout			91,368	68.53	91,374	68.07

=== 2nd constituency ===
Candidate	Party or alliance		Votes	%
Nathalie Oziol	New Popular Front	La France Insoumise	24,707	58.22
Robert Le Stum	Ensemble	Renaissance	7,230	17.04
Flavia Mangano	National Rally		7,202	16.97
Sandra Houée	The Republicans		1,821	4.29
Christelle Boyer	Union of Democrats and Independents (Note: Dissident who ran without the support of Ensemble)		1,157	2.73
Didier Michel	Far-left	Lutte Ouvrière	301	0.71
Hugo Leboon	Independent		19	0.04
Total			42,437	100.00
Valid votes			42,437	98.08
Invalid votes			282	0.65
Blank votes			547	1.26
Total votes			43,266	100.00
Registered voters/turnout			67,226	64.36

=== 3rd constituency ===
Candidate	Party or alliance		First round		Second round	
Candidate	Party or alliance		Votes	%	Votes	%
Fanny Dombre-Coste	New Popular Front	Socialist Party	22,968	33.90	36,860	58.29
Lauriane Troise	National Rally		21,872	32.28	26,379	41.71
Laurence Cristol	Ensemble	Renaissance	19,714	29.10		
Flavio Dalmau	Ecologists	Independent	2,049	3.02		
Babeth Segura	Reconquête		793	1.17		
Jacqueline Grandel	Far-left	Lutte Ouvrière	359	0.53		
Total			67,755	100.00	63,239	100.00
Valid votes			67,755	97.63	63,239	92.21
Invalid votes			482	0.69	1,118	1.63
Blank votes			1,164	1.68	4,227	6.16
Total votes			69,401	100.00	68,584	100.00
Registered voters/turnout			94,056	73.79	94,060	72.92

=== 4th constituency ===
Candidate	Party or alliance		First round		Second round	
Candidate	Party or alliance		Votes	%	Votes	%
Manon Bouquin	National Rally		35,216	41.26	40,186	50.49
Sébastien Rome	New Popular Front	La France Insoumise	28,171	33.00	39,408	49.51
Jean-François Eliaou	Ensemble	Horizons	19,260	22.56		
Bleuette Simon	Reconquête		1,822	2.13		
Florence Larue	Far-left	Lutte Ouvrière	886	1.04		
Total			85,355	100.00	79,594	100.00
Valid votes			85,355	96.70	79,594	90.66
Invalid votes			804	0.91	1,874	2.13
Blank votes			2,111	2.39	6,324	7.20
Total votes			88,270	100.00	87,792	100.00
Registered voters/turnout			120,416	73.30	120,394	72.92

=== 5th constituency ===
Candidate	Party or alliance		First round		Second round	
Candidate	Party or alliance		Votes	%	Votes	%
Stéphanie Galzy	National Rally		32,781	48.88	36,171	55.36
Aurélien Manenc	New Popular Front	Socialist Party	21,640	32.27	29,172	44.64
Philippe Huppé	Ensemble	Renaissance	9,369	13.97		
Lilian Bourrie	Reconquête		1,346	2.01		
Rémy Groussard	Independent		1,121	1.67		
Véronique Chesnard	Far-left	Lutte Ouvrière	809	1.21		
Total			67,066	100.00	65,343	100.00
Valid votes			67,066	96.39	65,343	93.55
Invalid votes			776	1.12	1,211	1.73
Blank votes			1,736	2.50	3,296	4.72
Total votes			69,578	100.00	69,850	100.00
Registered voters/turnout			100,010	69.57	100,018	69.84

=== 6th constituency ===
Candidate	Party or alliance		First round		Second round	
Candidate	Party or alliance		Votes	%	Votes	%
Julien Gabarron	National Rally		25,563	41.05	29,288	47.26
Emmanuelle Ménard	Miscellaneous right	Far-right	16,968	27.25	18,091	29.19
Magali Crozier	New Popular Front	La France Insoumise	13,126	21.08	14,592	23.55
Sarah Fatima Daudé-Allaoui	Ensemble	Horizons	6,149	9.87		
Laurent Gilhodes	Far-left	Lutte Ouvrière	472	0.76		
Total			62,278	100.00	61,971	100.00
Valid votes			62,278	97.95	61,971	97.27
Invalid votes			363	0.57	419	0.66
Blank votes			941	1.48	1,318	2.07
Total votes			63,582	100.00	63,708	100.00
Registered voters/turnout			94,941	66.97	94,986	67.07

=== 7th constituency ===
Candidate	Party or alliance		Votes	%
Aurélien Lopez-Liguori	National Rally		37,495	51.66
Gabriel Blasco	New Popular Front	Communist Party	18,415	25.37
Jocelyne Gizardin	Ensemble	Horizons	15,618	21.52
Daniel Pilaudeau	Far-left	Lutte Ouvrière	1,047	1.44
Total			72,575	100.00
Valid votes			72,575	96.85
Invalid votes			873	1.17
Blank votes			1,485	1.98
Total votes			74,933	100.00
Registered voters/turnout			110,462	67.84

=== 8th constituency ===
Candidate	Party or alliance		First round		Second round	
Candidate	Party or alliance		Votes	%	Votes	%
Cédric Delapierre	National Rally		25,831	40.12	29,446	49.67
Sylvain Carriere	New Popular Front	La France Insoumise	21,061	32.71	29,841	50.33
Isabelle Autier	Ensemble	Horizons	10,854	16.86		
Bérangère Dubus	Miscellaneous right	Independent	4,083	6.34		
Sabria Bouallaga	Ecologists	Independent	2,019	3.14		
Thomas Garnier	Far-left	Lutte Ouvrière	533	0.83		
Total			64,381	100.00	59,287	100.00
Valid votes			64,381	97.45	59,287	91.14
Invalid votes			571	0.86	1,452	2.23
Blank votes			1,112	1.68	4,314	6.63
Total votes			66,064	100.00	65,053	100.00
Registered voters/turnout			95,644	69.07	95,661	68.00

=== 9th constituency ===
Candidate	Party or alliance		First round		Second round	
Candidate	Party or alliance		Votes	%	Votes	%
Charles Alloncle	Union of the far right	The Republicans	21,734	36.43	28,433	51.90
Nadia Belaouni	New Popular Front	La France Insoumise	17,463	29.27	26,353	48.10
Patrick Vignal	Ensemble	Renaissance	14,918	25.00		
Anthony Belin	Miscellaneous right	Independent	2,046	3.43		
Frédéric Bort	Reconquête		1,481	2.48		
William Viste	Miscellaneous right	Independent	899	1.51		
Patrice Boccadifuoco	Miscellaneous right	Independent	584	0.98		
Nathalie Peiro	Far-left	Lutte Ouvrière	459	0.77		
Géry Laly	Miscellaneous right	Independent	82	0.14		
Total			59,666	100.00	54,786	100.00
Valid votes			59,666	97.22	54,786	90.58
Invalid votes			581	0.95	1,398	2.31
Blank votes			1,124	1.83	4,301	7.11
Total votes			61,371	100.00	60,485	100.00
Registered voters/turnout			90,642	67.71	90,654	66.72
