= Regional Council of Languedoc-Roussillon =

Former regional legislature in France

Logo of the Regional Council

The Regional council of Languedoc-Roussillon was the deliberative assembly of the former French region of Languedoc-Roussillon, local authority decentralized acting on the regional territory. It was headquartered in Montpellier, in a Hôtel built in 1988 by Ricardo Bofill, overlooking the Lez (from its left bank) and the Place de l'Europe in the continuity of the Antigone district.

Damien Alary (PS), chaired the September 29, 2014, following the death of Christian Bourquin (PS), himself succeeding the death of Georges Frêche on October 24, 2010, to December 31, 2015, when the region merged with the Midi-Pyrénées region within the newly created Occitanie region.

== Presidents of the Regional Council ==
- Francis Vals (1974 - June 27, 1974)
- Edgar Tailhades (1974 - 1983)
- Robert Capdeville (1983 - 1986)
- Jacques Blanc (1986 - 2004)
- Georges Frêche (March 28, 2004 - October 24, 2010)
- Christian Bourquin (November 10, 2010 - August 26, 2014)
- Damien Alary (September 29, 2014 - December 31, 2015)
