= Hérault's 4th constituency =

Constituency of the National Assembly of France

4th constituency of Hérault
- inline Constituency of the National Assembly of France

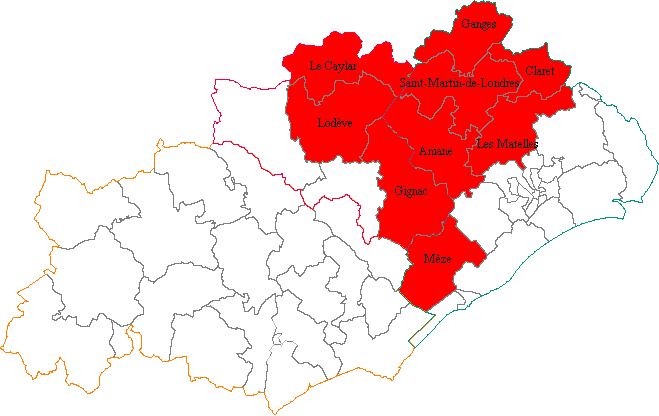

- Location of Hérault in France
- Deputy: Manon Bouquin; RN
- Department: Hérault
- Cantons: (pre-2015) Aniane, Le Caylar, Ganges, Gignac, Lodève, Les Matelles, Mèze, Saint-Martin-de-Londres, Claret
- Registered voters: 139,652

The 4th constituency of Hérault is a French legislative constituency in the Hérault département.

== Deputies ==
Election	Member	Party
1988	Georges Frêche	PS
1993	Gérard Saumade	DVG
1997	Gérard Saumade	MDC
2002	Robert Lecou	UMP
2007	Robert Lecou	UMP
2012	Frédéric Roig	PS
2017	Jean-François Eliaou	REM
2022	Sébastien Rome	LFI
2024	Manon Bouquin	RN

== Election results ==
=== 2024 ===
Candidate	Party	Alliance	First round			Second round		
Candidate	Party	Alliance	Votes	%	+/–	Votes	%	+/–
Manon Bouquin	RN		35,216	41.26	+18.55	40,186	50.49	+1.14
Sébastien Rome	LFI	NFP	28,171	33.00	+4.94	39,408	49.51	-1.14
Jean-François Eliaou	HOR	Ensemble	19,260	22.56	+1.69	withdrew		
Bluette Simon	REC		1,822	2.13	-3.01			
Florence Larue	LO		886	1.04	+0.53			
Votes			85,354	100.00		79,594	100.00	
Valid votes			85,354	96.70	-1.49	79,594	90.66	+4.08
Blank votes			2,111	2.39	+1.09	6,324	7.20	-3.06
Null votes			804	0.91	+0.40	1,874	2.13	-1.03
Turnout			88,269	73.30	+22.01	87,792	72.92	+22.62
Abstentions			32,147	26.70	-22.01	32,602	27.08	-22.62
Registered voters			120,416			120,394		
Result			RN GAIN FROM LFI					

=== 2022 ===
Legislative Election 2022: Hérault's 4th constituency
Party	Candidate	Votes	%	±%
LFI (NUPÉS)	Sébastien Rome	16,841	28.06	-3.97
RN	Manon Bouquin	13,633	22.71	+4.98
LREM (Ensemble)	Jean-François Eliaou	12,527	20.87	−10.62
PRG	Jean-Pierre Pugens	5,139	8.56	N/A
REC	Alexandre Arguel	3,085	5.14	N/A
DVD	Michel Garcia	2,181	3.63	N/A
UDI (UDC)	Joseph Francis	1,724	2.87	−8.82
DVD	Jean-Noël Fleury	1,306	2.18	N/A
DVE	Stéphane Cassarini	1,240	2.07	N/A
Others	N/A	2,342		
Turnout		61,126	51.29	
2nd round result
LFI (NUPÉS)	Sébastien Rome	26,291	50.65	N/A
RN	Manon Bouquin	25,617	49.35	+15.10
Turnout		51,908	50.30	+8.95
LFI gain from LREM				

=== 2017 ===
Candidate	Label	First round		Second round	
Candidate	Label	Votes	%	Votes	%
Jean-François Eliaou	REM	16,694	31.49	26,432	65.75
François Gaubert	FN	9,402	17.73	13,771	34.25
Étienne Hayem	FI	8,500	16.03		
Laurence Cristol	LR	6,199	11.69		
Frédéric Roig	PS	4,556	8.59		
Laurent Dupont	ECO	2,964	5.59		
Gilles Phocas	DVD	1,737	3.28		
Florian Vire	PCF	967	1.82		
Manuela Viaene	DIV	446	0.84		
Laurent Docon	DVG	414	0.78		
Georges Scotto Di Fasano	EXG	393	0.74		
Claude Feral	DVG	289	0.55		
Jacques Dourau	DVD	238	0.45		
Julie Péréa	DIV	145	0.27		
Mimose Lebon	ECO	73	0.14		
Votes		53,017	100.00	40,203	100.00
Valid votes		53,017	97.24	40,203	86.82
Blank votes		1,096	2.01	4,592	9.92
Null votes		410	0.75	1,513	3.27
Turnout		54,523	48.68	46,308	41.35
Abstentions		57,487	51.32	65,681	58.65
Registered voters		112,010		111,989	
Source: Ministry of the Interior

=== 2012 ===
2012 legislative election in Herault's 4th constituency
Candidate	Party	First round		Second round	
Candidate	Party	Votes	%	Votes	%
Frédéric Roig	PS	19,717	31.82%	32,306	55.39%
Robert Lecou	UMP	15,734	25.39%	26,031	44.63%
Christian Clausier	FN	10,573	17.06%		
Yvan Garcia	FG	5,055	8.16%		
Nadja Flank	EELV	2,872	4.63%		
Yves Pietrasanta	PRG	2,531	4.08%		
Pierre Pierrot Le Zygo		2,456	3.96%		
Hadj Madani	MoDem	961	1.55%		
Jean-Claude Martinez	FN dissident	531	0.86%		
Anne Andrieux	DLR	375	0.61%		
Bertrand Duculty	AEI	314	0.51%		
Philippe Brun	PCD	259	0.42%		
Valérie Cabanne	NPA	234	0.38%		
Maria-Antonieta Araya	LO	135	0.22%		
Marie-José Metzger		122	0.20%		
Ernest Comunale	Cap 21	97	0.16%		
Valid votes		61,966	98.71%	58,327	96.13%
Spoilt and null votes		809	1.29%	2,351	3.87%
Votes cast / turnout		62,775	60.79%	60,678	58.77%
Abstentions		40,486	39.21%	42,565	41.23%
Registered voters		103,261	100.00%	103,243	100.00%

=== 2007 ===
Legislative Election 2007: Hérault's 4th constituency
Party	Candidate	Votes	%	±%
UMP	Robert Lecou	36,291	42.74	
PS	Jean-Pierre Moure	23,879	28.12	
MoDem	Hadj Madani	6,033	7.10	
Far left	Yvan Garcia	5,509	6.49	
FN	France Jamet	4,492	5.29	
LV	Bruno Chichignoud	2,615	3.08	
Others	N/A	4,532		
Turnout		86,443	64.40	
2nd round result
UMP	Robert Lecou	43,683	51.68	
PS	Jean-Pierre Moure	40,844	48.32	
Turnout		87,794	65.41	
UMP hold				

=== 2002 ===
Legislative Election 2002: Hérault's 4th constituency
Party	Candidate	Votes	%	±%
UMP	Robert Lecou	25,612	32.12	
PS	Helene Mandroux-Colas	14,379	18.03	
FN	France Jamet	11,920	14.95	
LV	Marie Meunier	10,724	13.45	
PCF	Manuel Diaz	4,159	5.22	
CPNT	Ferdinand Jaoul	4,105	5.15	
Others	N/A	7,951		
Turnout		81,764	68.73	
2nd round result
UMP	Robert Lecou	38,112	52.70	
PS	Helene Mandroux-Colas	34,212	47.30	
Turnout		77,235	64.94	
UMP gain from DVG				

=== 1997 ===
Legislative Election 1997: Hérault's 4th constituency
Party	Candidate	Votes	%	±%
UDF	Robert Lecou	15,777	22.18	
DVG	Gérard Saumade	14,348	20.17	
PS	Hélène Mandroux-Colas	12,171	17.11	
FN	Louis Pascal	11,961	16.81	
PCF	Michel Tali	7,056	9.92	
LV	Claude Duplan	3,078	4.33	
DVD	Marie-Françoise Privat	1,979	2.78	
GE	François Buffa	1,582	2.22	
Others	N/A	3,184		
Turnout		74,516	71.16	
2nd round result
DVG	Gérard Saumade	42,392	58.60	
UDF	Robert Lecou	29,945	41.40	
Turnout		78,008	74.50	
DVG hold				

== Sources ==
- French Interior Ministry results website: "Résultats électoraux officiels en France" (in French).
- "Résultats électoraux officiels en France" (in French). 2017. Archived from the original on 14 June 2017.
