= Damien Alary =

French politician (1951–2025)

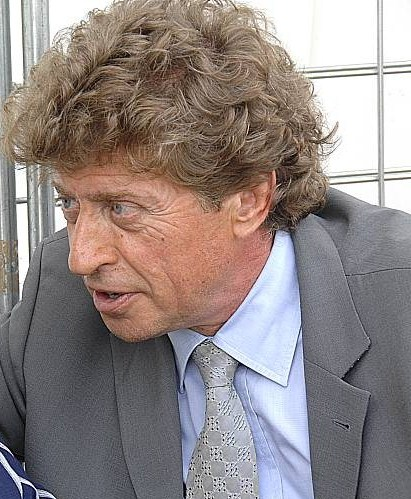
- Alary in 2009

Vice-President of the Regional Council of Occitania
- In office 4 January 2016 – 2 July 2021
- President: Carole Delga

Regional Councilor of Occitania
- In office 13 December 2015 – 2 July 2021
- President: Carole Delga

President of the Regional Council of Languedoc-Roussillon
- In office 29 September 2014 – 31 December 2015
- Preceded by: Christian Bourquin
- Succeeded by: Carole Delga

Vice-president of the Regional Council of Languedoc-Roussillon
- In office 28 March 2004 – 24 October 2010
- President: Georges Frêche

Chairman of the Departmental Council of Gard
- In office 23 March 2001 – 29 September 2014
- Preceded by: Alain Journet
- Succeeded by: William Dumas

Mayor of Pompignan
- In office 3 February 1979 – 5 March 1999
- Preceded by: Marcel Valat
- Succeeded by: Claude Reynard

Personal details
- Born: 17 January 1951 Pompignan, France
- Died: 27 August 2025 (aged 74)
- Party: PS (1976–2010); DVG (2010); PS (2010–2025)

Damien Joseph Marius Alary (French pronunciation: [damjɛ̃ alaʁi]; 17 January 1951 – 27 August 2025) was a French politician and a member of the Socialist Party.

Alary was the president of the departmental council of Gard from 2001 to 2014, then briefly president of the regional council of Languedoc-Roussillon from 2014 to 2015.

== Life and career ==
=== Political career ===
Alary joined the Socialist Party in 1977 after a meeting with Michel Rocard.

In 1979, he was elected mayor of Pompignan; in 1986, regional councilor of Languedoc-Roussillon, and in 1988, general councilor of the canton of Saint-Hippolyte-du-Fort.

He was elected in Gard's 5th constituency in 1997 and re-elected in 2002, from the Socialist Group.

After having chaired the socialist group, under the presidency of Alain Journet, within the general council of Gard from 1998 to 2001, he was elected president in 2001.

In 2004, he was elected first vice-president of the Regional Council. After the regional elections of 2004, he resigned because of multiple mandates.

On 23 February 2010, he was excluded from the Socialist Party following his rallying to the list led by Georges Frêche against that of the PS.

On 28 October 2010, after the death of Georges Frêche, the group of socialists excluded and related to the Regional Council elects its candidate for the presidency of the Languedoc-Roussillon region. Alary lost against Christian Bourquin by 13 votes against 18 in secret ballots. The following 10 November, Christian Bourquin was elected president of the regional council, and Robert Navarro replaced Damien Alary from the post of first vice-president he had held since 2004. Alary then asked for his reinstatement in the PS, which he then obtained.

Suffering from laryngeal cancer, which he revealed himself in 2011, Alary retained all of his elected functions and mandates. In January 2012, he affirmed “[to be] still good for the service” and “intact in [his] commitment”.

After considering a candidacy for the 2014 municipal elections in Nîmes, Alary announced his resignation on 10 September 2013.

After the death of Christian Bourquin on 26 August 2014, Alary announced his candidacy for the presidency of the Regional Council of Languedoc-Roussillon. He was elected by the regional council on 29 September.

In September 2015, it took the position, with Jean-Claude Gayssot, for the implementation of a European policy for welcoming “Mediterranean refugees”. On 7 October 2015, he succeeded Francina Armengol as the president of the Pyrenees-Mediterranean Euroregion.

During the 2015 regional election in Languedoc-Roussillon-Midi-Pyrénées, head of the PS list in Gard, he announced that he was leading his "last political fight".

=== Personal life and death ===
Coming from a family of Pompignan wine growers, he owned a vineyard and olive grove. He was married and had a son, Yannick, born in 1976, who became a notary in Alès. Alary died on 27 August 2025, at the age of 74.

== Distinctions ==

On 3 June 2010, Alary received the Legion of Honour from Simone Veil at the Luxembourg Palace.
