= Pyrenees–Mediterranean Euroregion =

Political cooperation organisation

Euroregió Pirineus Mediterrània Eurorégion Pyrénées–Méditerannée Eurorregión Pirineos Mediterráneo Euroregion Pirenèus-Mediterranèa Pyrenees–Mediterranean Euroregion
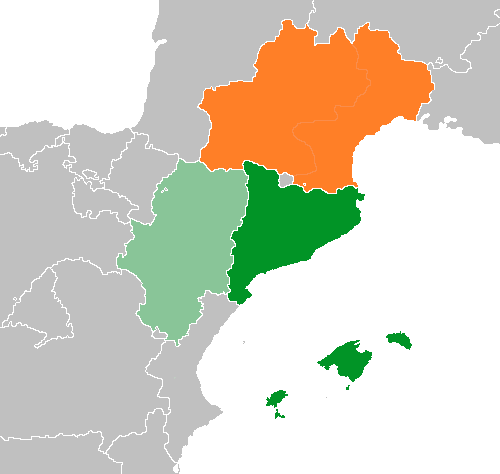
- Map

Agency overview
- Formed: 2004
- Jurisdiction: Northwestern Mediterranean
- Headquarters: (France) Perpignan
- Agency executive: Pere Aragonès
- Website: Pyrenees–Mediterranean Euroregion

The Pyrenees–Mediterranean Euroregion (EPM) is a European Grouping of Territorial Cooperation (EGTC). Founded in 2004, it is a political cooperation organisation between the Generalitat of Catalonia, the Government of the Balearic Islands and the Occitanie / Pyrénées-Méditerranée Region.

Its name in French is Eurorégion Pyrénées-Méditerranée, in Catalan Euroregió Pirineus Mediterrània, in Occitan Euroregion Pirinèus Mediterranèa, and in Spanish (Castilian) Eurorregión Pirineos Mediterráneo.

The Euroregion's main working languages are Catalan and French, plus Spanish, Occitan and English for various communications.

== Historical background ==
Originally formed in the 1990s by Jordi Pujol, it was under the guidance of Pascual Maragall that the Pyrenees–Mediterranean Euroregion was created on 29 October 2004. It was founded as an instrument of political cooperation following an agreement between Aragon, Catalonia, the Balearic Islands and the former Languedoc-Roussillon and Midi-Pyrénées regions.

Cooperation between the five members is based on various key topics including cultural exchanges, higher education, the environment or the economy. The aim is to create a sustainable development hub in the Mediterranean focusing on innovation and economic and social integration.

In 2006, because of conflicts with Catalonia over ecclesiastical property in the Aragon Fringe, the Autonomous Community of Aragon decided to withdraw from the Euroregion.

Since August 2009, the Euroregion has been a EGTC. This is a new instrument with its own legal personality that enables the institution to pursue its objectives, especially in terms of cross-border, transnational and inter-regional cooperation.

Following the implementation of the NOTRe law by François Hollande in 2015, two of the Euroregion's member regions, Languedoc-Roussillon and Midi-Pyrénées, were merged to form the Occitanie / Pyrénées Méditerranée region.

Initially established in Toulouse, Barcelona and Brussels, the Euroregion's offices were relocated to Perpignan in September 2017.

== Organisation and operation ==
=== Governance ===
The EGTC is composed of the Occitanie Region, the Generalitat of Catalonia and the Government of the Balearic Islands, the three founding members, who take it in turns to hold the rotating presidency for two-year periods.

Since April 2, 2025, the General Assembly has been chaired by Marga Prohens, President of the Government of the Balearic Islands.

Successive Presidents
Rank	Presidents	Mandate		Region
1	Pasqual Maragall	October 2004	January 2006	Catalonia
2	Martin Malvy	January 2006	December 2007	Midi-Pyrénées
3	Francesc Antich	December 2007	June 2009	Balearic Islands
4	Georges Frêche replaced by Christian Bourquin	June 2009; 24 October 2010	24 October 2010 (death); April 2011	Languedoc-Roussillon
5	Artur Mas	April 2011	October 2012	Catalonia
6	Martin Malvy	October 2012	May 2014	Midi-Pyrénées
7	José Ramón Bauzá, then Francina Armengol	May 2014 July 2015	July 2015 October 2015	Balearic Islands
8	Damien Alary, then Carole Delga	October 2015 January 2016	January 2016 June 2017	Languedoc-Roussillon Occitania
9	Carles Puigdemont replaced by Quim Torra	June 2017; May 2018	May 2018; February 2019	Catalonia
10	Francina Armengol	February 2019	October 2020	Balearic Islands
11	Carole Delga	October 2020	February 2023	Occitania
12	Pere Aragonès replaced by Salvador Illa	10 February 2023	2 April 2025	Catalonia
13	Marga Prohens	2 April 2025	2027	Balearic Islands

The current policy priorities are :

- to be a concrete and tangible operational player for local areas and players;

- to position itself as a benchmark for European and Mediterranean policies;

- to deal with climate change and the economic, health and social crisis, in order to become a resilient region;

- to drive societal change by giving citizens a voice;

- to consolidate the Euroregion through the new roadmap to 2030.

=== Technical secretariat ===
The Euroregion's technical secretariat, headed by the Secretary General, is made up of 10 civil servants and contract staff recruited by the EGTC to ensure the effective operation of the institution and the monitoring of the action plan and European projects in which it is involved.

The Secretary General is named by the presidency, on the suggestion of the General Assembly. He manages the activity of the structure, prepares the budget and deliberations and guarantees the general administration of the EGTC according to the guidelines and missions decided by the Assembly and by delegation of the presidency.

=== General Meeting ===
The Assembly, chaired by the President of the Euroregion (or, if he is unable to attend, by his substitute), is composed of the current presidents of the member territorial authorities and autonomous communities. The Assembly has full competence for all competences whose exercise has not been entrusted to other EGTC bodies.

=== Committees ===
The EPM works with 5 thematic committees:

- Culture

- Innovation

- Tourism

- Higher education and research

- Environment, climate change and energy.

They are responsible for implementing the multiannual action plan set out in the 2021-2030 roadmap. They finance the corresponding actions and monitor the structure's strategic projects, including calls for Euroregional projects, as well as European projects in which the EPM is a partner. They also take part in the selection panels for applications submitted in response to calls for projects.

The Commissions are composed of political representatives and heads of sectoral departments and agencies from each of the 3 territories and are coordinated by the General Secretary, with the support of the Technical Secretariat.

=== Objectives ===
The Pyrenees–Mediterranean Euroregion aims to build a resilient future by 2030, as well as the sustainable development of its territory.

The Euroregion is clearly defined as a leading territory in the Mediterranean through its ambitious policy:

- for greater social cohesion, with citizens at the heart of the Euroregional project,

- supporting a sustainable, competitive and circular economy that is carbon-neutral and based on the digital transition,

- for a sustainable region that preserves its resources and prepares for the challenges of climate change,

- for a strong culture with a Mediterranean Euroregional identity.

== Sources ==
- Some material from this article is taken from the French Wikipedia article GECT Pyrénées-Mediterranée.
