= François Delmas =

French politician

Mayor of Montpellier
- In office March 1959 – March 1977
- Preceded by: Jean Zuccarelli
- Succeeded by: Georges Frêche

Member of the National Assembly for Hérault's 1st constituency
- In office 2 April 1978 – 6 May 1978
- Preceded by: Georges Frêche
- Succeeded by: Robert-Félix Fabre

Personal details
- Born: 24 August 1913 Montpellier, France
- Died: 3 March 2002 (aged 88) Montpellier, France
- Resting place: Florac, Lozère, France
- Party: UDF
- Other political affiliations: PR
- Education: Sciences Po
- Profession: Lawyer

François Delmas (24 August 1913 – 3 March 2002) was a French politician. He was mayor of Montpellier from 1959 to 1977 and briefly a member of the National Assembly. He was also Secretary of State for the Environment in Raymond Barre's government from 1978 to 1981.
