= Pompignan =

Pompignan is the name or part of the name of several communes in France:

- Pompignan, in the Gard department
- Pompignan, in the Tarn-et-Garonne department
