= Willy Diméglio =

French politician (1934–2020)

General Councillor for Canton of Montpellier-4
- In office 1976–1988

Municipal Councillor for Montpellier
- In office 1983–1995

Deputy of Hérault
- In office 1986–1988

Member of the National Assembly for Hérault's 1st constituency
- In office 2 April 1986 – 21 April 1997
- Succeeded by: Gilbert Roseau

General Councillor for Canton of Montpellier-1
- In office 1988–2001

Personal details
- Born: 3 May 1934 Philippeville, French Algeria
- Died: 27 March 2020 (aged 85)
- Party: PR; UDF
- Occupation: Politician

Willy Diméglio (3 May 1934 – 27 March 2020) was a French politician.

== Biography ==
Diméglio was defeated by Georges Frêche in the Montpellier municipal elections in 1989.

He was made a Knight of the Legion of Honour in 1998.
