= Anne-Yvonne Le Dain =

French politician

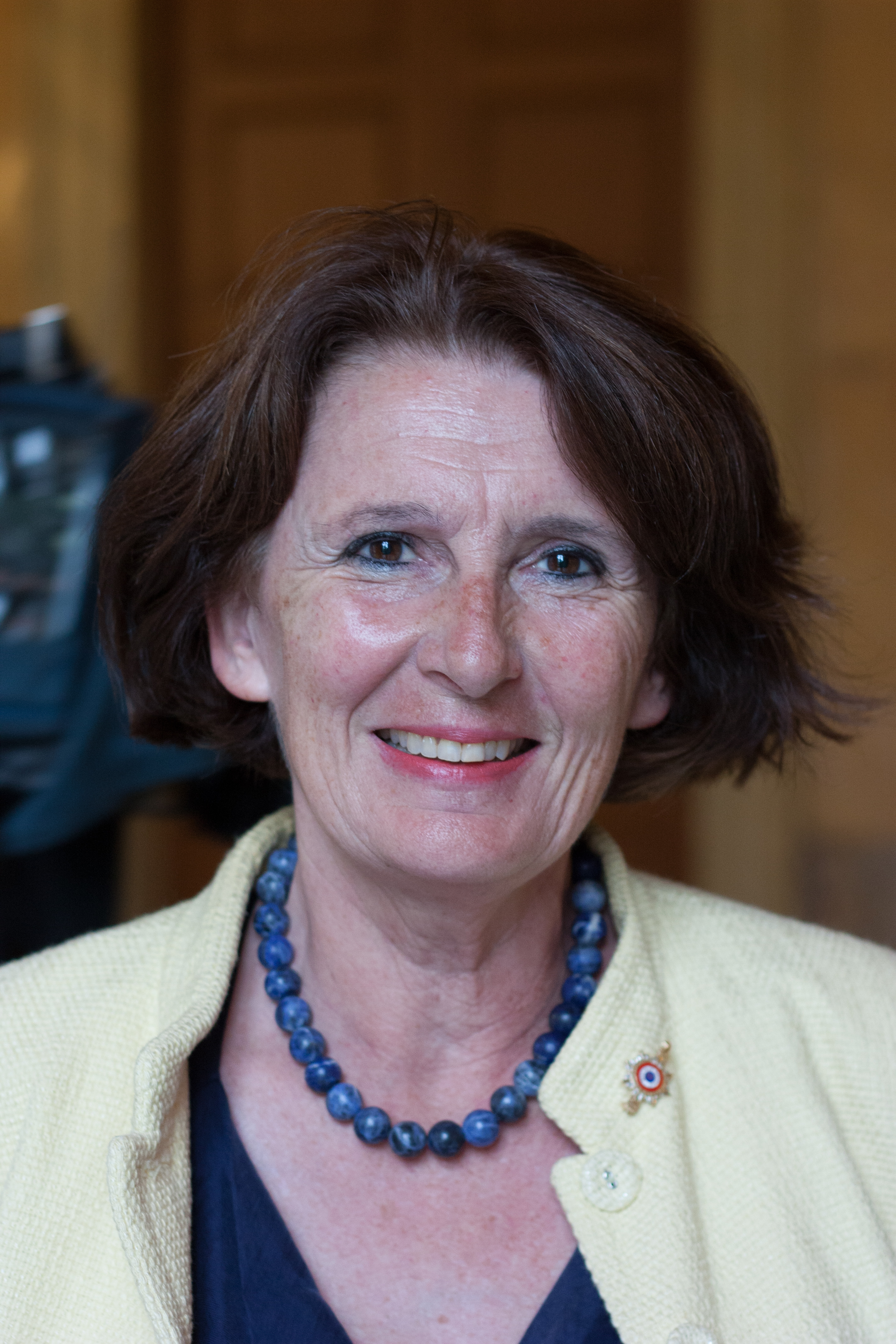

Member of the French National Assembly for Hérault's 2nd constituency
- In office 20 June 2012 – 20 June 2017
- Preceded by: André Vézinhet
- Succeeded by: Muriel Ressiguier

Personal details
- Born: 1 September 1955 (age 70) Versailles, Yvelines, France
- Party: Territories of Progress (since 2020)
- Other political affiliations: Socialist (until 2020)

Anne-Yvonne Le Dain (born 1 September 1955 in Versailles) is a French politician. She was the Socialist Member of Parliament for Hérault's 2nd constituency from 2012 to 2017.

== Early life ==
Le Dain was born in Versailles.

== Career ==
She was elected to parliament in the 2012 French legislative election.

In the 2017 election, she came in seventh place in her own constituency on the first-round. Her seat was eventually won by Muriel Ressiguier from La France Insoumise.

In 2020, she joined the new political party; Territories of Progress.

== See also ==
- List of deputies of the 14th National Assembly of France
