= Jacques Domergue =

French politician

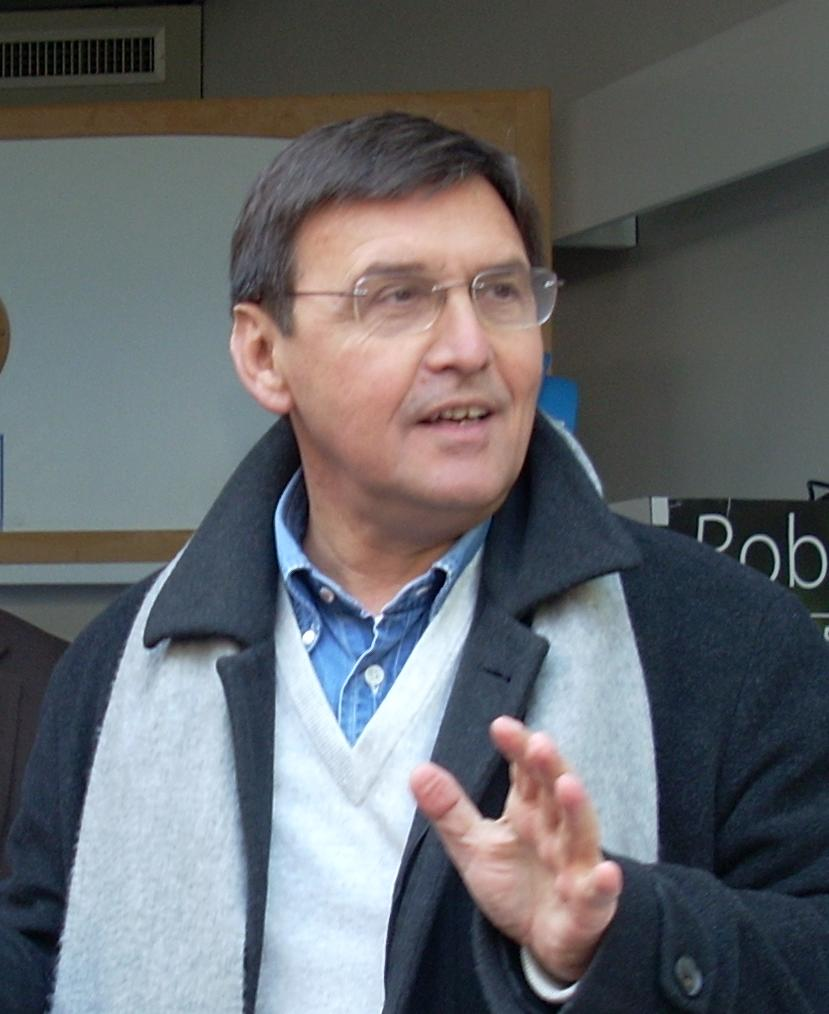

Member of the National Assembly
- In office 2002–2007
- Preceded by: Georges Frêche
- Succeeded by: André Vézinhet
- Constituency: Hérault's 2nd constituency
- In office 2007–2012
- Preceded by: Christian Jeanjean
- Succeeded by: Jean-Louis Roumégas
- Constituency: Hérault's 1st constituency

Personal details
- Born: 25 March 1953 (age 73) Perpignan, Pyrénées-Orientales, France
- Party: Union for a Popular Movement (UMP)
- Profession: surgeon

Jacques Domergue (born 25 March 1953) is a French politician. He was a member of the National Assembly of France for the Hérault department from 2002 to 2012, for the 2nd constituency from 2002 to 2007, and the 1st constituency from 2007 to 2012. He is also a municipal counciller in Montpellier and has served on the regional council for Languedoc-Roussillon. He is a member of the Union for a Popular Movement (UMP).
