= Hérault's 2nd constituency =

Constituency of the National Assembly of France

2nd constituency of Hérault
- inline Constituency of the National Assembly of France

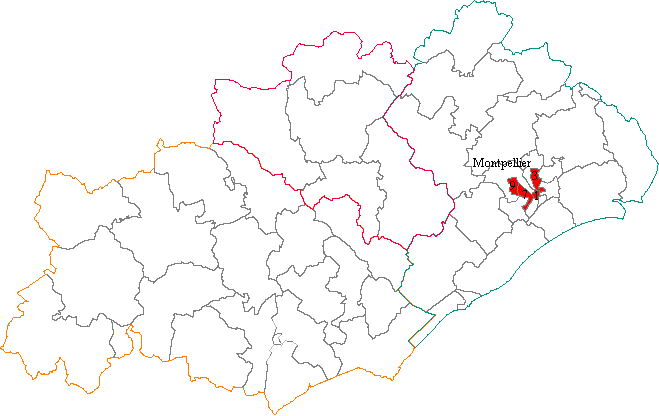
- Constituency shown within Hérault

- Location of Hérault in France
- Deputy: Nathalie Oziol; LFI
- Department: Hérault
- Cantons: (pre-2015) Montpellier-1, Montpellier-3, Montpellier-7, Montpellier-9.
- Registered voters: 65,416

The 2nd constituency of Hérault is a French legislative constituency in the Hérault département.

== Deputies ==
Election	Member	Party
1988	Georges Frêche	PS
1993	Bernard Serrou	RPR
1997	Georges Frêche	PS
2002	Jacques Domergue	UMP
2007	André Vézinhet	PS
2012	Anne-Yvonne Le Dain	PS
2017	Muriel Ressiguier	LFI
2022	Nathalie Oziol	LFI

== Election results ==
=== 2024 ===
Candidate	Party	Alliance	First round			Second round		
Candidate	Party	Alliance	Votes	%	+/–	Votes	%	+/–
Nathalie Oziol	LFI	NFP	24,707	58.11	+17.74			
Robert Le Stum	REN	Ensemble	7,230	17.04	-1.48			
Flavia Mangano	RN		7,202	16.97	+8.24			
Sandra Houée	LR	UDC	1,821	4.29	new			
Christelle Boyer	UDI		1,157	2.73	+1.06			
Didier Michel	LO		301	0.71	+0.24			
Hugo Leboon	DIV		19	0.04	new			
Votes			42,437	100.00				
Valid votes			42,437	98.08	-0.42			
Blank votes			547	1.26	+0.23			
Null votes			282	0.65	+0.18			
Turnout			43,266	64.36	+20.10			
Abstentions			23,960	35.64	-20.10			
Registered voters			67,226					
Result			LFI HOLD					

=== 2022 ===
Legislative Election 2022: Hérault's 2nd constituency
Party	Candidate	Votes	%	±%
LFI (NUPÉS)	Nathalie Oziol	11,513	40.37	+4.38
LREM (Ensemble)	Annie Yague	5,282	18.52	-10.06
DVG	Fatima Ballaredj	3,406	11.94	N/A
RN	Flavia Mangano	2,490	8.73	+0.59
DVG	Muriel Ressiguier	1,424	4.99	N/A
REC	Sophie Defretin	1,195	4.19	N/A
DVC	Mahfoud Benali	1,011	3.55	N/A
DVC	Anne Brissaud	896	3.14	N/A
Others	N/A	1,299		
Turnout		28,951	44.26	+0.59
2nd round result
LFI (NUPÉS)	Nathalie Oziol	17,008	63.33	+11.04
LREM (Ensemble)	Annie Yague	9,847	36.67	−11.04
Turnout		26,855	43.48	+5.91
LFI hold				

=== 2017 ===
Candidate	Label	First round		Second round	
Candidate	Label	Votes	%	Votes	%
Stéphanie Jannin	REM	7,375	28.58	9,866	47.71
Muriel Ressiguier	FI	5,886	22.81	10,811	52.29
Nancy Canaud	LR	2,931	11.36		
Pierre Aliotti	FN	2,100	8.14		
Fatima Bellaredj	PS	1,784	6.91		
Coralie Mantion	ECO	1,339	5.19		
Anne-Yvonne Le Dain	DVG	1,328	5.15		
Mustapha Abdelli	DIV	294	1.14		
Fouad Lazaar	DVG	285	1.10		
Isabel Cabeca	PCF	278	1.08		
Zoé de Bonduwe	ECO	255	0.99		
Claudia Dechassat	DLF	228	0.88		
Eddine Ariztegui	DIV	221	0.86		
Elie Guerreiro-Viseu	DIV	207	0.80		
Patrick Boot	ECO	190	0.74		
Antoine Rollet	DIV	189	0.73		
Dalila Yousfi	PRG	159	0.62		
Claire Goyat	DIV	153	0.59		
Sylvie Vayssade	DVG	151	0.59		
Hssain Imougar	DVG	147	0.57		
Didier Michel	EXG	139	0.54		
Sébastien Higuet	DVG	133	0.52		
Célia Lutrat	DIV	32	0.12		
Francis Meynier	DVG	1	0.00		
Votes		25,805	100.00	20,677	100.00
Valid votes		25,805	97.78	20,677	91.06
Blank votes		431	1.63	1,480	6.52
Null votes		156	0.59	550	2.42
Turnout		26,392	43.67	22,707	37.57
Abstentions		34,044	56.33	37,731	62.43
Registered voters		60,436		60,438	
Source: Ministry of the Interior

=== 2012 ===
2012 legislative election in Herault's 2nd constituency
Candidate	Party	First round		Second round	
Candidate	Party	Votes	%	Votes	%
Anne-Yvonne Le Dain	PS	12,030	39.32%	18,666	66.35%
Anne Brissaud	PR	6,112	19.98%	9,467	33.65%
René Revol	FG	3,872	12.66%		
Yamina Vion	FN	3,435	11.23%		
Mustapha Majdoul	EELV	2,019	6.60%		
Joseph Francis		1,211	3.96%		
Alain Privat	MoDem	705	2.30%		
Eric Schmitt	AEI	308	1.01%		
Mohamed Haddouti		228	0.75%		
Martine Granier	NPA	218	0.71%		
Romain Mauger	PP	213	0.70%		
Maurice Chaynes	LO	101	0.33%		
Jean-Pierre Sparfel	POI	72	0.24%		
Carole Meyer		68	0.22%		
Nicolas Jacot	PRG	0	0.00%		
Nicolas Jacot	PRG	0	0.00%		
Nicolas Jacot	PRG	0	0.00%		
Valid votes		30,592	98.45%	28,133	96.53%
Spoilt and null votes		481	1.55%	1,032	3.54%
Votes cast / turnout		31,073	53.29%	29,145	49.93%
Abstentions		27,233	46.71%	29,221	50.07%
Registered voters		58,306	100.00%	58,366	100.00%

=== 2007 ===
Legislative Election 2007: Hérault's 2nd constituency
Party	Candidate	Votes	%	±%
UMP	Arnaud Julien	14,500	37.70	
PS	André Vézinhet	13,497	35.09	
MoDem	Philippe Sala	2,653	6.90	
LV	Christian Dupraz	1,936	5.03	
FN	Hélène Zouroudis	1,398	3.64	
Far left	Martine Granier	1,115	2.90	
PCF	Françoise Prunier	945	2.46	
Others	N/A	2,415		
Turnout		39,048	58.20	
2nd round result
PS	André Vézinhet	21,177	53.92	
UMP	Arnaud Julien	18,099	46.08	
Turnout		40,335	60.12	
PS gain from UMP				

=== 2002 ===
Legislative Election 2002: Hérault's 2nd constituency
Party	Candidate	Votes	%	±%
PS	Georges Frêche	13,419	35.84	
UMP	Jacques Domergue	12,518	33.43	
FN	Helene Zouroudis	4,474	11.95	
LV	Olivier Taoumi	2,089	5.58	
LCR	Dolores Ben Hamed	913	2.44	
PCF	Francoise Prunier	828	2.21	
Others	N/A	3,202		
Turnout		38,118	65.96	
2nd round result
UMP	Jacques Domergue	17,881	50.32	
PS	Georges Frêche	17,654	49.68	
Turnout		36,995	64.02	
UMP gain from PS				

=== 1997 ===
Legislative Election 1997: Hérault's 2nd constituency
Party	Candidate	Votes	%	±%
PS	Georges Frêche	10,706	30.82	
RPR	Bernard Serrou	9,294	26.75	
FN	Alain Jamet	6,228	17.93	
Far left	Jean-Claude Biau	2,306	6.64	
PCF	Colette Zannettaci	2,241	6.45	
LO	Maurice Chaynes	1,060	3.05	
MRC	Denis Brouillet	874	2.52	
DVD	Jacqueline Corral	813	2.34	
Others	N/A	1,218		
Turnout		36,160	66.64	
2nd round result
PS	Georges Frêche	19,134	53.76	
RPR	Bernard Serrou	16,458	40.24	
Turnout		38,342	70.67	
PS gain from RPR				

== Sources ==
- Official results of French elections: "Résultats électoraux officiels en France" (in French).
