= Manon Bouquin =

French politician (born 1992)

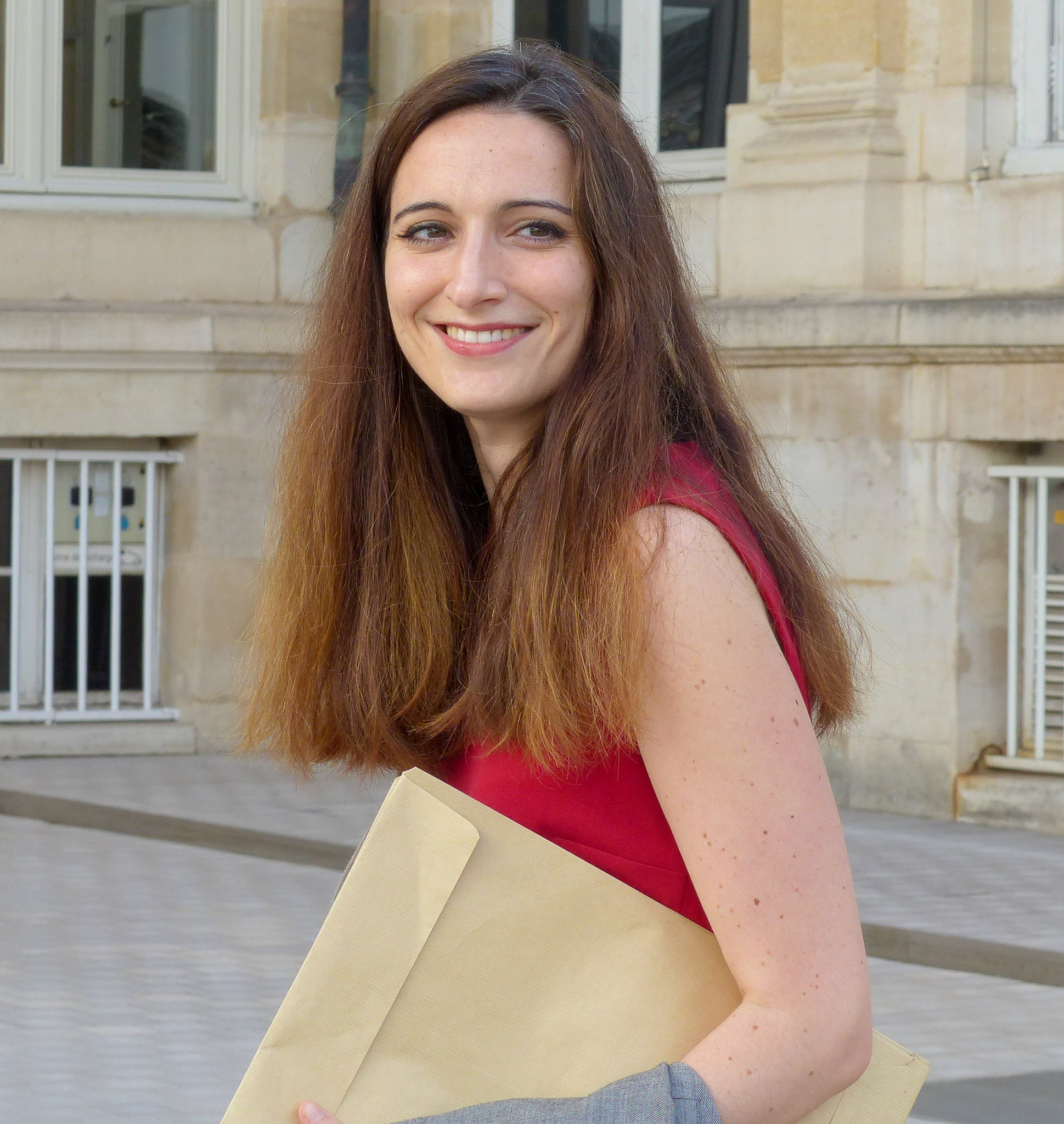

Member of the National Assembly for Hérault's 4th constituency
- Incumbent
- Assumed office 8 July 2024
- Preceded by: Sébastien Rome

Personal details
- Born: 2 June 1992 (age 33) Évreux, France
- Party: National Rally

Manon Bouquin (French pronunciation: [manɔ̃ bukɛ̃]; born 2 June 1992) is a French politician who has represented the 4th constituency of Hérault in the National Assembly since 2024. She is a member of the National Rally (RN).

== Biography ==
Bouquin was born in Évreux in 1992. She studied at the Sorbonne with the aim of becoming a history teacher. During her studies, she was active in the Student Cockade student union and was opposed to François Fillon's proposals for the French healthcare system.

In 2018, she became a member of the national council of the National Rally and began working as a parliamentary assistant to France Jamet in the European Parliament and then as an attaché for Aurélien Lopez-Liguori.

Bouquin contested Hérault's 4th constituency during the 2022 French legislative election but was defeated by Sébastien Rome of NUPES in the second round of voting. She contested the same seat in 2024 and was successful at winning. Before dissolution in 2024, at the time of the European elections, she was a candidate on the National Rally list, in 52nd position, so she was not elected.

In September 2024, she joined the executive office of the National Rally group and became its vice-president in charge of relations with the Patriots for Europe group.

In March 2025, her Paris apartment on the Rue de l'Université, Paris in a building owned by the National Assembly for elected representatives was burgled by former MP Eva Son-Forget. According to several sources, Son-Forget emptied the minibar and stole dresses belonging to Bouquin before fleeing the scene pursued by the security service. A preliminary investigation opened by the Paris prosecutor's office for "theft" and "violation of domicile."
