= Hérault's 3rd constituency =

Constituency of the National Assembly of France

3rd constituency of Hérault
- inline Constituency of the National Assembly of France

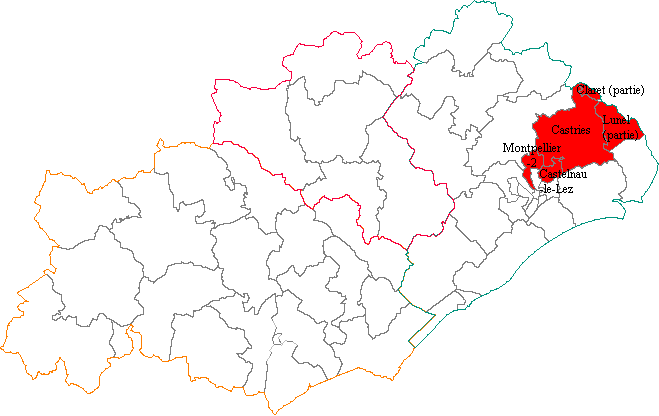

- Location of Hérault in France
- Deputy: Fanny Dombre-Coste; PS
- Department: Hérault
- Cantons: (pre-2015) Castelnau-le-Lez, Castries, Montpellier-2, Boisseron, Saturargues, Saussines, Saint-Christol, Saint-Sériès, Vérargues, Villetelle, Claret
- Registered voters: 118,043

The 3rd constituency of Hérault is a French legislative constituency in the Hérault département.

== Deputies ==
Election	Member	Party
1988	René Couveinhes	RPR
1993	René Couveinhes	RPR
1997	Christine Lazerges	PS
2002	Jean-Pierre Grand	UMP
2007	Jean-Pierre Grand	RS
2012	Fanny Dombre-Coste	PS
2017	Coralie Dubost	LREM
2022	Laurence Cristol	RE
2024	Fanny Dombre-Coste	PS

== Election results ==
=== 2024 ===
Candidate	Party	Alliance	First round			Second round		
Candidate	Party	Alliance	Votes	%	+/–	Votes	%	+/–
Fanny Dombre-Coste	PS	NFP	22,968	33.90	+7.31	36,860	58.29	+11.39
Lauriane Troise	RN		21,872	32.28	+14.98	26,379	41.71	new
Laurence Cristol	REN	Ensemble	19,714	29.10	+2.42	withdrew		
Flavio Dalmau	ECO		2,049	3.02	new			
Babeth Segura	REC		793	1.17	-4.33			
Serge Gachon	LO		359	0.53	n/c			
Votes			67,755	100.00		63,239	100.00	
Valid votes			67,755	97.63	-0.88	63,239	92.21	+0.52
Blank votes			1,164	1.68	+0.64	4,227	6.16	+0.38
Null votes			482	0.69	+0.24	1,118	1.63	-0.90
Turnout			69,401	73.79	+22.43	68,584	72.92	+21.95
Abstentions			24,655	26.21	-22.43	25,476	27.08	-21.95
Registered voters			94,056			94,060		
Result			PS GAIN FROM RE					

=== 2022 ===
Legislative Election 2022: Hérault's 3rd constituency
Party	Candidate	Votes	%	±%
LREM (Ensemble)	Laurence Cristol	12,457	26.68	-10.49
EELV (NUPÉS)	Julia Mignacca	12,416	26.59	-0.84
RN	Johana Maurel	8,080	17.30	+4.28
DVG	Jean Luc Bergeon	4,370	9.36	N/A
LR (UDC)	Alain Berthet	2,603	5.57	−2.94
REC	Nicolas Lauron	2,568	5.50	N/A
DVG	Philippe Saurel	2,070	4.43	N/A
DVE	Alexis Boudaud-Anduaga	996	2.13	N/A
Others	N/A	1,139		
Turnout		47,407	51.36	−0.70
2nd round result
LREM (Ensemble)	Laurence Cristol	22,907	53.10	-7.35
EELV (NUPÉS)	Julia Mignacca	20,229	46.90	+7.35
Turnout		43,136	50.97	+6.67
LREM hold				

=== 2017 ===
Candidate	Label	First round		Second round	
Candidate	Label	Votes	%	Votes	%
Coralie Dubost	REM	16,174	37.17	20,211	60.45
Stéphane Vidal	FI	6,386	14.68	13,226	39.55
Lauriane Troise	FN	5,667	13.02		
Fanny Dombre-Coste	PS	5,007	11.51		
Catherine Dardé	LR	3,703	8.51		
Arnaud Moynier	DVD	3,262	7.50		
Gabriel Mutel	DIV	640	1.47		
Sébastien Avallone	DVD	616	1.42		
Logan Girard	PCF	539	1.24		
Marie-Noëlle Sibieude	DVG	502	1.15		
Joëlle Comte	DLF	480	1.10		
Florence Larue	EXG	277	0.64		
Laurence Benéteau	DIV	252	0.58		
Laurent Hoarau	ECO	6	0.01		
Votes		43,511	100.00	33,437	100.00
Valid votes		43,511	98.21	33,437	88.69
Blank votes		586	1.32	3,017	8.00
Null votes		206	0.46	1,248	3.31
Turnout		44,303	52.06	37,702	44.30
Abstentions		40,803	47.94	47,407	55.70
Registered voters		85,106		85,109	
Source: Ministry of the Interior

=== 2012 ===
2012 legislative election in Herault's 3rd constituency
Candidate	Party	First round		Second round	
Candidate	Party	Votes	%	Votes	%
Fanny Dombre Coste	PS	16,306	33.95%	23,559	54.84%
Jean-Pierre Grand	UMP	8,331	17.35%	19,399	45.16%
Alain Berthet	DVD	7,746	16.13%		
Jean-Luc Bouchereau	FN	7,628	15.88%		
Robert Trinquier	FG	3,078	6.41%		
Marie-Noëlle Sibieude	EELV	2,142	4.46%		
Aurélie Armand	MoDem	1,045	2.18%		
Patrice Silvestre	AEI	580	1.21%		
Grégory Lamotte	Cap 21	562	1.17%		
Thomas Balenghien	NPA	245	0.51%		
Guy Gimenes		124	0.26%		
Florence Larue	LO	122	0.25%		
André Grangeon		121	0.25%		
Cécile Jacot	PRG	0	0.00%		
Valid votes		48,030	98.74%	42,958	94.09%
Spoilt and null votes		612	1.26%	2,698	5.91%
Votes cast / turnout		48,642	62.83%	45,656	58.97%
Abstentions		28,772	37.17%	31,760	41.03%
Registered voters		77,414	100.00%	77,416	100.00%

=== 2007 ===
Legislative Election 2007: Hérault's 3rd constituency
Party	Candidate	Votes	%	±%
UMP	Jean-Pierre Grand	36,628	46.59	
PS	Christine Lazerges	21,169	26.92	
MoDem	Georges Fandos	5,325	6.77	
FN	Julia Plane	4,902	6.23	
LV	Zinab Bourguet	2,155	2.74	
PCF	Michel Genibrel	1,960	2.49	
CPNT	Laurent Jaoul	1,920	2.44	
Far left	Cyril Gispert	1,582	2.01	
Others	N/A	2,984		
Turnout		79,845	63.37	
2nd round result
UMP	Jean-Pierre Grand	43,039	56.70	
PS	Christine Lazerges	32,863	43.30	
Turnout		78,535	62.33	
UMP hold				

=== 2002 ===
Legislative Election 2002: Hérault's 3rd constituency
Party	Candidate	Votes	%	±%
PS	Christine Lazerges	23,105	30.13	
UMP	Jean-Pierre Grand	22,766	29.69	
FN	Jean-Louis Pelletier	12,461	16.25	
DVD	Pierre Dudieuzere	4,964	6.47	
DVD	Jean-Luc Meissonnier	3,664	4.78	
CPNT	Jean-Pierre Gaillard	1,747	2.28	
LV	Jean Charpentier	1,702	2.22	
LCR	Noura El Ghayati	1,604	2.09	
Others	N/A	4,668		
Turnout		78,307	68.26	
2nd round result
UMP	Jean-Pierre Grand	38,419	54.37	
PS	Christine Lazerges	32,237	45.63	
Turnout		73,963	64.47	
UMP gain from PS				

=== 1997 ===
Legislative Election 1997: Hérault's 3rd constituency
Party	Candidate	Votes	%	±%
PS	Christine Lazerges	17,579	26.92	
FN	Jean-Louis Pelletier	12,847	19.67	
RPR	René Couveinhes	10,957	16.78	
DVD	Jean-Pierre Grand	10,168	15.57	
PCF	Michel Genibrel	5,386	8.25	
LV	Nicole Moschetti-Stamm	2,387	3.66	
DVD	Jean-Luc Maillot	1,312	2.01	
Others	N/A	3,845		
Turnout		68,512	69.63	
2nd round result
PS	Christine Lazerges	36,309	58.57	
FN	Jean-Louis Pelletier	25,679	41.43	
Turnout		70,660	71.82	
PS gain from RPR				

== Sources ==
- French Interior Ministry results website: "Résultats électoraux officiels en France" (in French).
