= Coralie Dubost =

French politician (born 1983)

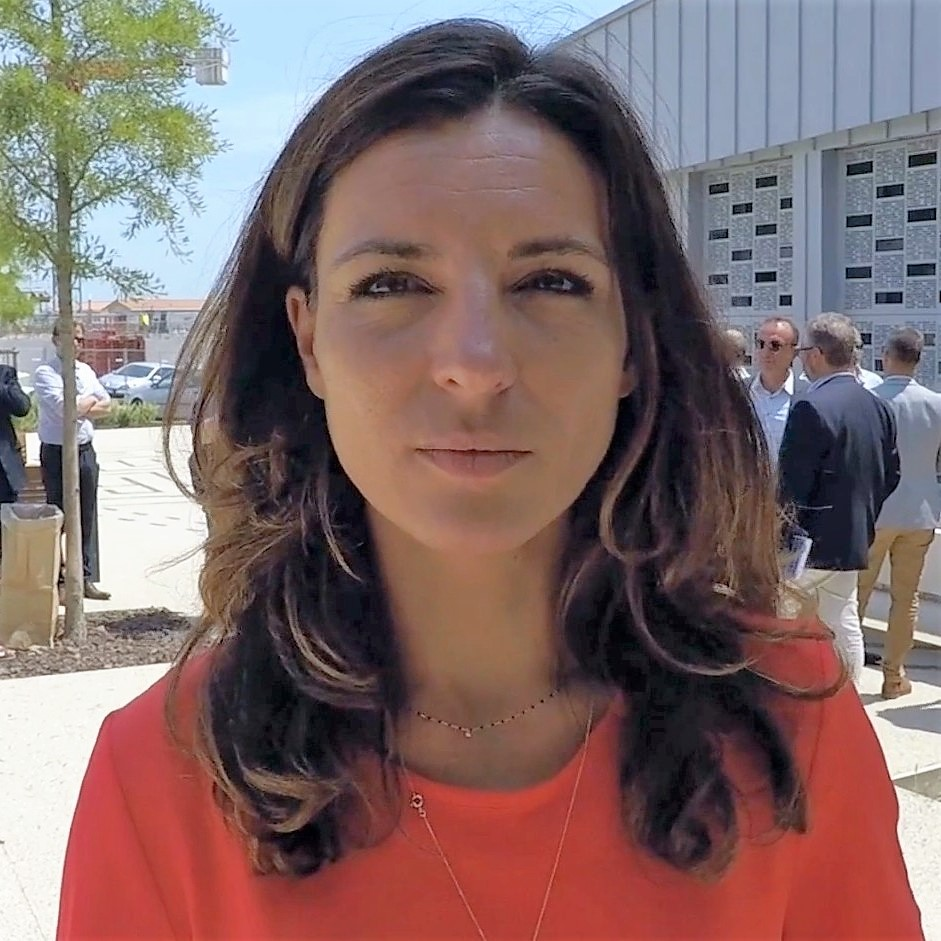

Member of the National Assembly for Hérault's 3rd constituency
- In office 21 June 2017 – 21 June 2022
- Preceded by: Fanny Dombre-Coste
- Succeeded by: Laurence Cristol

Personal details
- Born: 4 March 1983 (age 43) Montpellier, France
- Party: La République En Marche!
- Domestic partner: Olivier Véran (2018–2021)
- Education: University of Montpellier
- Profession: Jurist

Coralie Dubost (born 4 March 1983) is a French jurist and politician who served as the member of National Assembly for the 3rd constituency of the Hérault department from 2017 to 2022. She is a member of La République En Marche! (LREM). Accused of mismanagement of her mandate fees, she announced her withdrawal from the political scene three weeks prior to the 2022 legislative election, declining to run for reelection to a second term in office.

== Political career ==
Ahead of the 2017 legislative election, Dubost built the local chapter of La République En Marche! in Montpellier, growing a membership of 5,400 within ten months.

After she entered Parliament, Dubost served as one of four deputy chairpersons of the LREM parliamentary group alongside Pacôme Rupin, Danièle Hérin and Gilles Le Gendre under the leadership of group president Richard Ferrand (2017–2018). In 2018, she supported Laetitia Avia to become group president, a position Le Gendre was elected to. She serves as Vice President of the Committee on Legal Affairs. In addition to her committee assignments, she is a member of the French-Chinese Parliamentary Friendship Group.

In May 2020, Dubost joined En commun (EC), a group within LREM led by Barbara Pompili.

In September 2020, Dubost was a candidate to succeed Le Gendre as parliamentary group president; she came in fourth. In the final round of the vote, she endorsed Christophe Castaner, who appointed her as one of his deputies alongside Aurore Bergé.

== Political positions ==
=== Foreign policy ===
In July 2019, Dubost voted in favour of the French ratification of the European Union’s Comprehensive Economic and Trade Agreement (CETA) with Canada.

=== Domestic policy ===
In 2019, Dubost steered through Parliament a bioethics law extending to homosexual and single women free access to fertility treatments such as in vitro fertilisation (IVF) under France's national health insurance; it was one of the campaign promises of President Emmanuel Macron and marked the first major social reform of his five-year term.

Along with four other LREM members – Cécile Rilhac, Jean-Michel Mis, Stéphane Trompille and Éric Bothorel – Dubost disassociated herself from their colleague Aurore Bergé when the latter announced her intention in October 2019 to vote for a Republican draft law banning the wearing of the hijab by women accompanying groups of students on school outings.

In 2020, Dubost was one of the LREM members who endorsed an animal welfare referendum calling for a ban on some hunting practices deemed "cruel".

== Other activities ==
- France China Foundation, Member of the Steering Committee

== Personal life ==
Dubost was in a relationship with fellow LREM politician Olivier Véran from 2018 to 2021.
