= Hérault's 1st constituency =

Constituency of the National Assembly of France

1st constituency of Hérault
- inline Constituency of the National Assembly of France

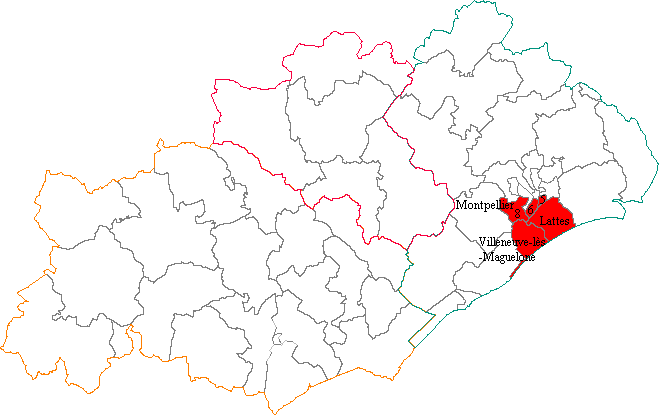
- Constituency shown within Hérault

- Location of Hérault in France
- Deputy: Jean-Louis Roumegas; LE
- Department: Hérault
- Cantons: (pre-2015) Lattes, Montpellier-5, Montpellier-6, Montpellier-8, Villeneuve-lès-Maguelone
- Registered voters: 90,089

The 1st constituency of Hérault is a French legislative constituency in the Hérault département, covering

== Deputies ==
Election	Member	Party
1988	Willy Diméglio	UDF
1993	Willy Diméglio	UDF
1997	Gilbert Roseau	PS
2002	Christian Jeanjean	UMP
2007	Jacques Domergue	UMP
2012	Jean-Louis Roumégas	EELV
2017	Patricia Mirallès	LREM
2022	Patricia Mirallès	TdP
2024	Jean-Louis Roumegas	LE

== Election results ==
=== 2024 ===
Candidate	Party	Alliance	First round			Second round		
Candidate	Party	Alliance	Votes	%	+/–	Votes	%	+/–
Josyan Oliva	LR-RN	UXD	20,891	34.11	new	25,868	44.81	new
Jean-Louis Roumegas	LE	NFP	20,851	34.04	+7.10	31,864	55.19	+7.74
Patricia Miralles	RE	Ensemble	13,806	22.54	-2.29	withdrew		
Eric Chaveroche	LR	UDC	2,626	4.29	+0.68			
Stéphanie Lévy	ECO		1,479	2.41	new			
Alexandre Arguel	REC		1,104	1.80	-4.41			
Morgane Lachiver	LO		491	0.80	+0.33			
Votes			61,248	100.00		57,732	100.00	
Valid votes			61,248	97.82	-0.23	57,732	92.82	+2.01
Blank votes			1,024	1.64	+0.18	3,534	5.68	-1.06
Null votes			339	0.54	+0.05	934	1.50	-0.96
Turnout			62,611	68.53	+22.54	62,200	68.07	+23.09
Abstentions			28,757	31.47	-22.54	29,174	31.93	-23.09
Registered voters			91,368			91,374		
Result			LE GAIN FROM RE					

=== 2022 ===
Legislative Election 2022: Hérault's 1st constituency
Party	Candidate	Votes	%	±%
LFI (NUPÉS)	Julien Colet	10,943	26.94	+0.64
TdP (Ensemble)	Patricia Mirallès	10,087	24.83	-9.29
RN	France Jamet	8,360	20.58	+3.76
PRG	Florian Depret	3,289	8.10	N/A
REC	Florence Medina	2,523	6.21	N/A
LR (UDC)	Eric Chaveroche	1,466	3.61	−6.10
DVE	Vincent Rivet-Martel	1,178	2.90	N/A
DVD	Michel Moxin	1,044	2.57	N/A
Others	N/A	1,732		
Turnout		41,430	45.99	−1.75
2nd round result
TdP (Ensemble)	Patricia Mirallès	19,338	52.55	-13.14
LFI (NUPÉS)	Julien Colet	17,463	47.45	N/A
Turnout		36,801	44.98	+4.82
TdP gain from LREM				

=== 2017 ===
Candidate	Label	First round		Second round	
Candidate	Label	Votes	%	Votes	%
Patricia Mirallès	REM	13,481	34.12	19,877	65.69
France Jamet	FN	6,644	16.82	10,381	34.31
Julien Colet	FI	6,163	15.60		
Jean-Louis Roumégas	ECO	4,228	10.70		
Joseph Francis	UDI	3,836	9.71		
Michel Moxin	DVD	1,738	4.40		
Frédéric Bort	DVG	1,149	2.91		
Fabienne Albarran	DLF	614	1.55		
Valérie Garnier	DIV	499	1.26		
William Gomez	DVG	338	0.86		
Nicolas Miray	DIV	311	0.79		
Morgane Lachiver	EXG	216	0.55		
Laurent Pithon	EXD	205	0.52		
Alain Visseq	EXG	84	0.21		
Votes		39,506	100.00	30,258	100.00
Valid votes		39,506	97.76	30,258	89.01
Blank votes		721	1.78	2,886	8.49
Null votes		185	0.46	849	2.50
Turnout		40,412	47.74	33,993	40.16
Abstentions		44,233	52.26	50,651	59.84
Registered voters		84,645		84,644	
Source: Ministry of the Interior

=== 2012 ===
2012 legislative election in Herault's 1st constituency
Candidate	Party	First round		Second round	
Candidate	Party	Votes	%	Votes	%
Christian Jeanjean	UMP	12,133	26.63%	21,266	49.90%
Jean-Louis Roumegas	EELV–PS	12,096	26.55%	21,354	50.10%
Alain Jamet	FN	8,254	18.12%		
Cyril Meunier		5,781	12.69%		
Frédérique Thonnat	FG	3,253	7.14%		
Charles Khoury	PS dissident	1,120	2.46%		
Martine Plane	MoDem	672	1.47%		
Patrice Drevet	PR	637	1.40%		
Gaëlle Coulon	??	502	1.10%		
Francis Viguie		307	0.67%		
Géraldine Mena Heredia	AEI	304	0.67%		
Joëlle Comte	DLR	252	0.55%		
Jean-Baka Domelevo Entfellner	LO	150	0.33%		
José Tur		100	0.22%		
Valid votes		45,561	98.45%	42,620	95.37%
Spoilt and null votes		716	1.55%	2,069	4.63%
Votes cast / turnout		46,277	58.49%	44,689	56.49%
Abstentions		32,836	41.51%	34,418	43.51%
Registered voters		79,113	100.00%	79,107	100.00%

=== 2007 ===
Legislative Election 2007: Hérault's 1st constituency
Party	Candidate	Votes	%	±%
UMP	Jacques Domergue	18,880	42.49	
PS	Michel Guibal	12,442	28.00	
MoDem	Marc Dufour	3,375	7.60	
LV	Jean-Louis Roumegas	2,311	5.20	
FN	Alain Jamet	2,093	4.71	
Far left	David Hermet	1,459	3.28	
PCF	Michel Passet	985	2.22	
Others	N/A	2,884		
Turnout		45,124	58.85	
2nd round result
UMP	Jacques Domergue	23,094	52.20	
PS	Michel Guibal	21,149	47.80	
Turnout		45,651	59.54	
UMP hold				

=== 2002 ===
Legislative Election 2002: Hérault's 1st constituency
Party	Candidate	Votes	%	±%
PS	Gilbert Roseau	12,641	28.88	
UMP	Christian Jeanjean	11,607	26.52	
FN	Alain Jamet	6,623	15.13	
UDF	Willy Dimeglio	5,885	13.45	
LV	Jean-Louis Roumegas	2,887	6.60	
LCR	David Hermet	1,152	2.63	
Others	N/A	2,971		
Turnout		44,656	66.00	
2nd round result
UMP	Christian Jeanjean	21,751	54.27	
PS	Gilbert Roseau	18,331	45.73	
Turnout		42,040	62.13	
UMP gain from PS				

=== 1997 ===
Legislative Election 1997: Hérault's 1st constituency
Party	Candidate	Votes	%	±%
UDF	Willy Dimeglio	11,377	29.31	
PS	Gilbert Roseau	10,214	26.31	
FN	Jean-Claude Martinez	7,765	20.00	
PCF	Marylise Blanc	3,058	7.88	
LV	Jean-Louis Roumegas	1,786	4.60	
Far left	Alain Voyer	1,355	3.49	
DVD	Jean-Pierre Cartaut	872	2.25	
Others	N/A	2,394		
Turnout		40,305	66.23	
2nd round result
PS	Gilbert Roseau	18,682	44.23	
UDF	Willy Dimeglio	17,801	42.15	
FN	Jean-Claude Martinez	5,751	13.62	
Turnout		43,630	71.69	
PS gain from UDF				

== Sources ==
- French Interior Ministry results website: "Résultats électoraux officiels en France" (in French).
