= Muriel Ressiguier =

French politician (born 1977)

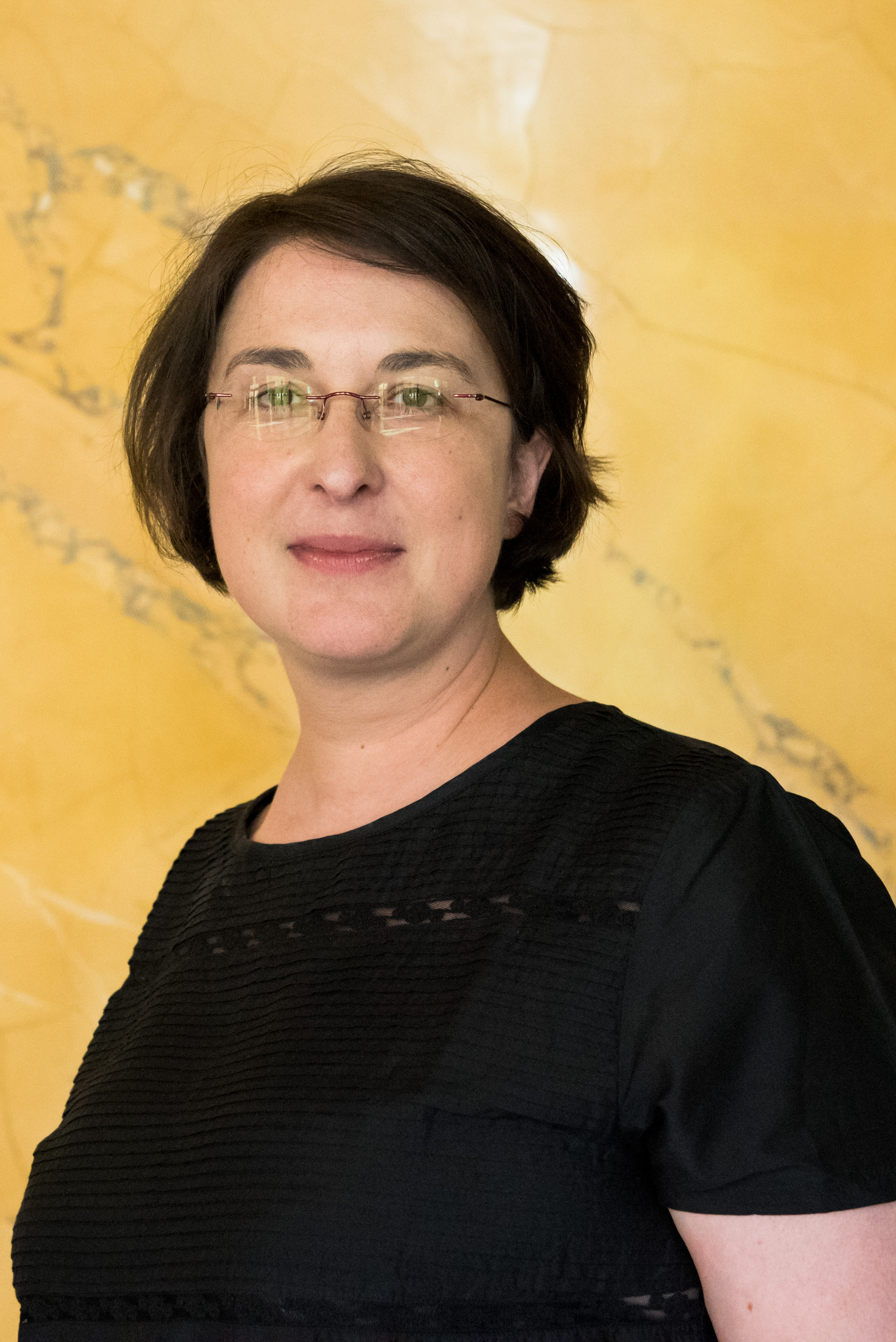
- Muriel Ressiguier in 2017

Member of the French National Assembly for Hérault's 2nd constituency
- In office 21 June 2017 – 21 June 2022
- Preceded by: Anne-Yvonne Le Dain
- Succeeded by: Nathalie Oziol

Personal details
- Born: 21 December 1977 (age 48) Châteauroux, France
- Party: Left Party; La France Insoumise
- Profession: Regional Medical Services Employee

Muriel Ressiguier (born 21 December 1977) is a French politician formerly of La France Insoumise. She was elected to the French National Assembly on 18 June 2017, representing the department of Hérault. Ressiguier was the Member of Parliament for Hérault's 2nd constituency.

Ressiguier began her political career as an anti-Gulf War activist. In September 2020, she joined the Ensemble! group. Disillusioned with NUPES, Ressiguier ran in the 2022 French legislative election as a miscellaneous left candidate. She was eliminated in the first round, coming in fifth place, losing her seat to the new candidate La France Insoumise Nathalie Oziol.

== See also ==
- List of deputies of the 15th National Assembly of France
