= Departmental Council of Gard =

Departmental Legislature in France

Departmental Council of Gard Conseil départemental du Gard

Leadership
- President: Françoise Laurent-Perrigot, PS since 27 November 2020

Structure
- Seats: 46
- Political groups: Government (24): PS (8); DVG (7); PCF (6); LÉ (2); PRG (1); Opposition (22): LR (10); UDI (4); DVD (2); DVG (2); RN (2); Ind (2); www.gard.fr

The Departmental Council of Gard (French: Conseil Départemental du Gard, Occitan: Conselh Departamental de Gard) is the deliberative assembly of the department of Gard in the region of Occitanie. It consists of 46 members (general councilors) from 23 cantons and its headquarters are in Nîmes.

The President of the General Council is Françoise Laurent-Perrigot.

== Vice-Presidents ==
The President of the Departmental Council is assisted by 13 vice-presidents chosen from among the departmental advisers. Each of them has a delegation of authority.

List of vice-presidents (as of 2021)
Order	Departmental advisor	Party	Canton (constituency)
1st	Christophe Serre	PS	Pont-Saint-Esprit
2nd	Bérengère Noguier	EELV	Uzès
3rd	Patrick Malavieille	PCF	Le Grand-Combe
4th	Nathalie Nury	PS	Roquemaure
5th	Christian Bastid	PCF	Nîmes-2
6th	Maryse Giannaccini	PS	Clavisson
7th	Martin Delord	DVG	Le Vigan
8th	Helene Meunier	DVG	Le Vigan
9th	Olivier Gaillard	DVG	Quissac
10th	Cathy Chaulet	PCF	Rousson
11th	Remi Nicolas	DVG	Marguerittes
12th	Amal Roofer	DVG	Nîmes-2
13th	Bruno Pascal	PS	Vauvert

== See also ==
- Gard
- General councils of France
