= Robert Lecou =

French politician

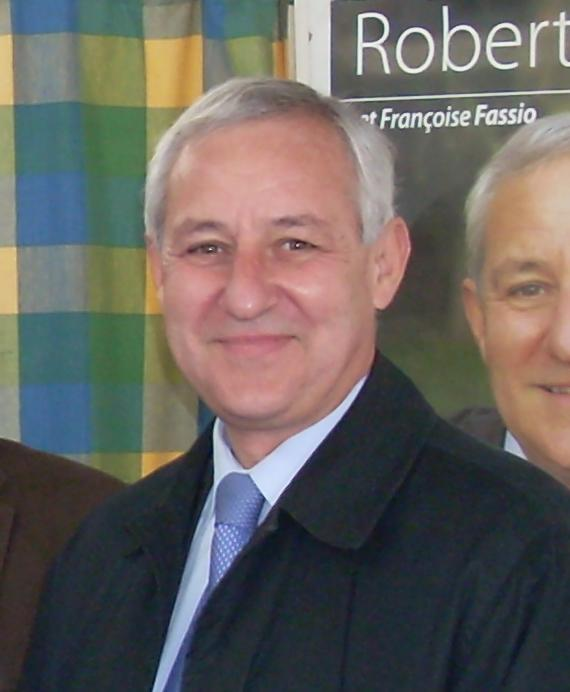
Robert Lecou

Robert Lecou (born 25 July 1950 in Paris) is a French politician.

He was elected a Deputy of the National Assembly of France on 16 June 2002, for the 4th constituency in the Hérault department. He is a member of the Radical Party.

He stood for reelection in 2007 and won with 51.68% of the votes.

In 2008 he lost his bid for reelection as the Mayor of Lodève to the socialist Marie-Christine Bousquet who received 56.08% of the votes.

In the 2012 election he was defeated by Frédéric Roig of the socialists.

== Positions held ==
- 20/03/1989 - 18/06/1995 : Member of Lodève (Hérault) Municipal Council.
- 01/03/1990 - 18/06/1995 : Deputy Mayor Lodève (Hérault).
- 28/03/1994 - 18/03/2001 : Member of the Hérault 'Conseil Général'.
- 19/06/1995 - 18/03/2008 : Mayor of Lodève (Hérault)
- 19/03/2001 - 16/07/2002 : Member of the Hérault 'Conseil Général'.
- ../../1994 - : Vice-président of the Radical Party.

== Awards ==
- Chevalier of the Ordre national du Mérite.
