= Françoise Laurent-Perrigot =

French politician (born 1950)

Françoise Laurent-Perrigot (French: [fʁɑ̃swaz loʁɑ̃ pɛʁiɡo]; born 27 February 1950) is a former member of the Senate of France, who represented the Gard department from 2008 to 2014. She is a member of the Socialist Party.
