= Patricia Mirallès =

French politician

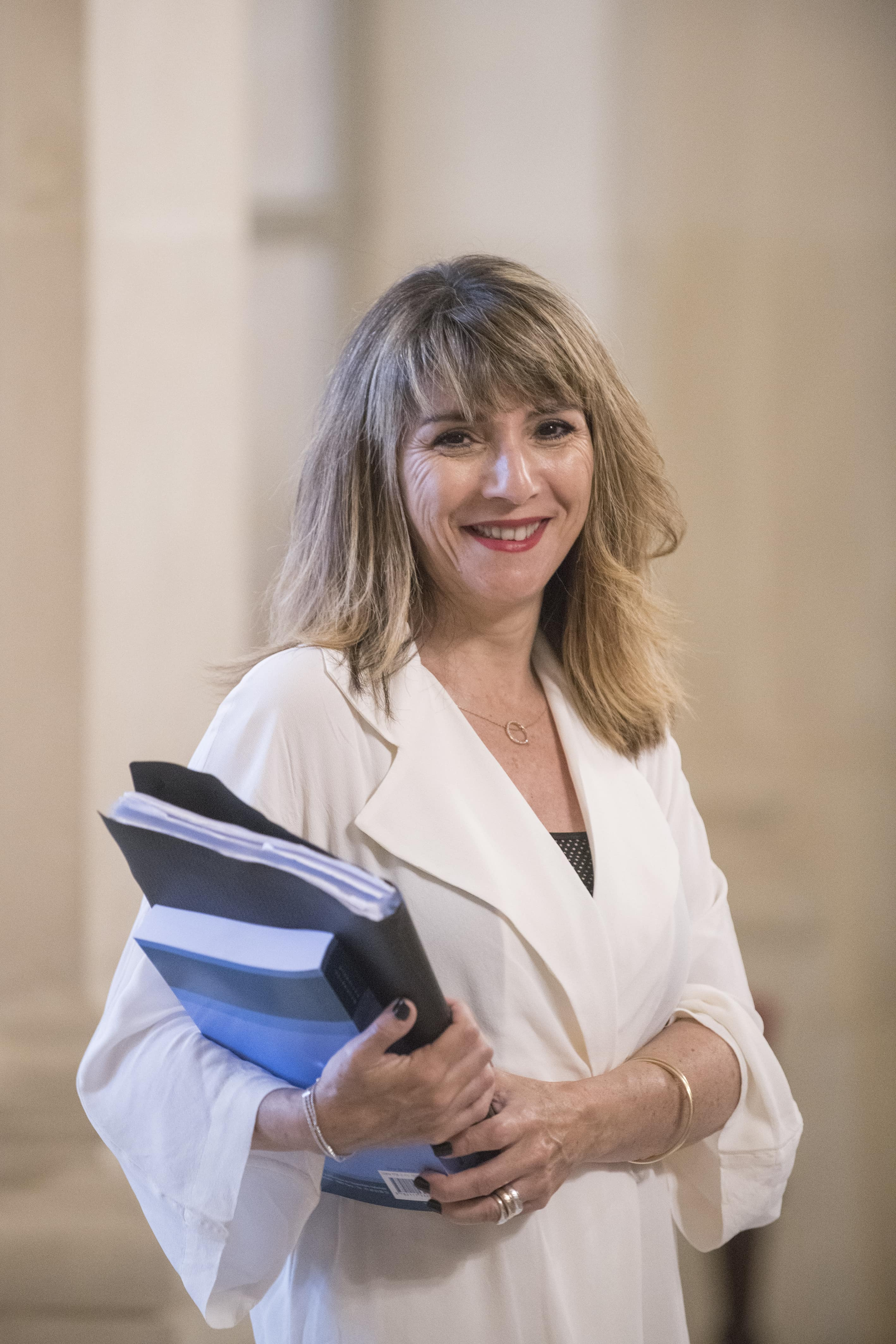

Secretary of State for Veterans and Remembrance
- In office 4 July 2022 – 21 September 2024
- President: Emmanuel Macron
- Prime Minister: Élisabeth Borne; Gabriel Attal
- Preceded by: Geneviève Darrieussecq
- Succeeded by: Position abolished

Member of the National Assembly for Hérault's 1st constituency
- In office 21 June 2017 – 4 August 2022
- Preceded by: Jean-Louis Roumégas
- Succeeded by: Philippe Sorez

Member of the Municipal council of Montpellier
- Incumbent
- Assumed office 30 March 2014
- Mayor: Philippe Saurel; Michaël Delafosse

Personal details
- Born: 22 August 1967 (age 58) Montpellier, France
- Party: Renaissance

Patricia Mirallès (born 22 August 1967) is a French politician of the Renaissance party who has been serving as Secretary of State to the Minister of the Armed Forces in the government of successive Prime Ministers Élisabeth Borne and Gabriel Attal from 2022 to 2024. From the 2017 elections to 2022, she was a member of the French National Assembly, representing the department of Hérault.

== Early life and education ==
Mirallès was born to Pieds-Noirs parents and grew up in Montpellier.

== Political career ==
Mirallès was a member of the Socialist Party from 1997 until 2012. From 2017 until 2020, she was a member of La République En Marche! (LREM).

In parliament, Mirallès served on the Defence Committee. From 2022, she became Ministers of Veterans and War Victims
