= André Vézinhet =

French politician

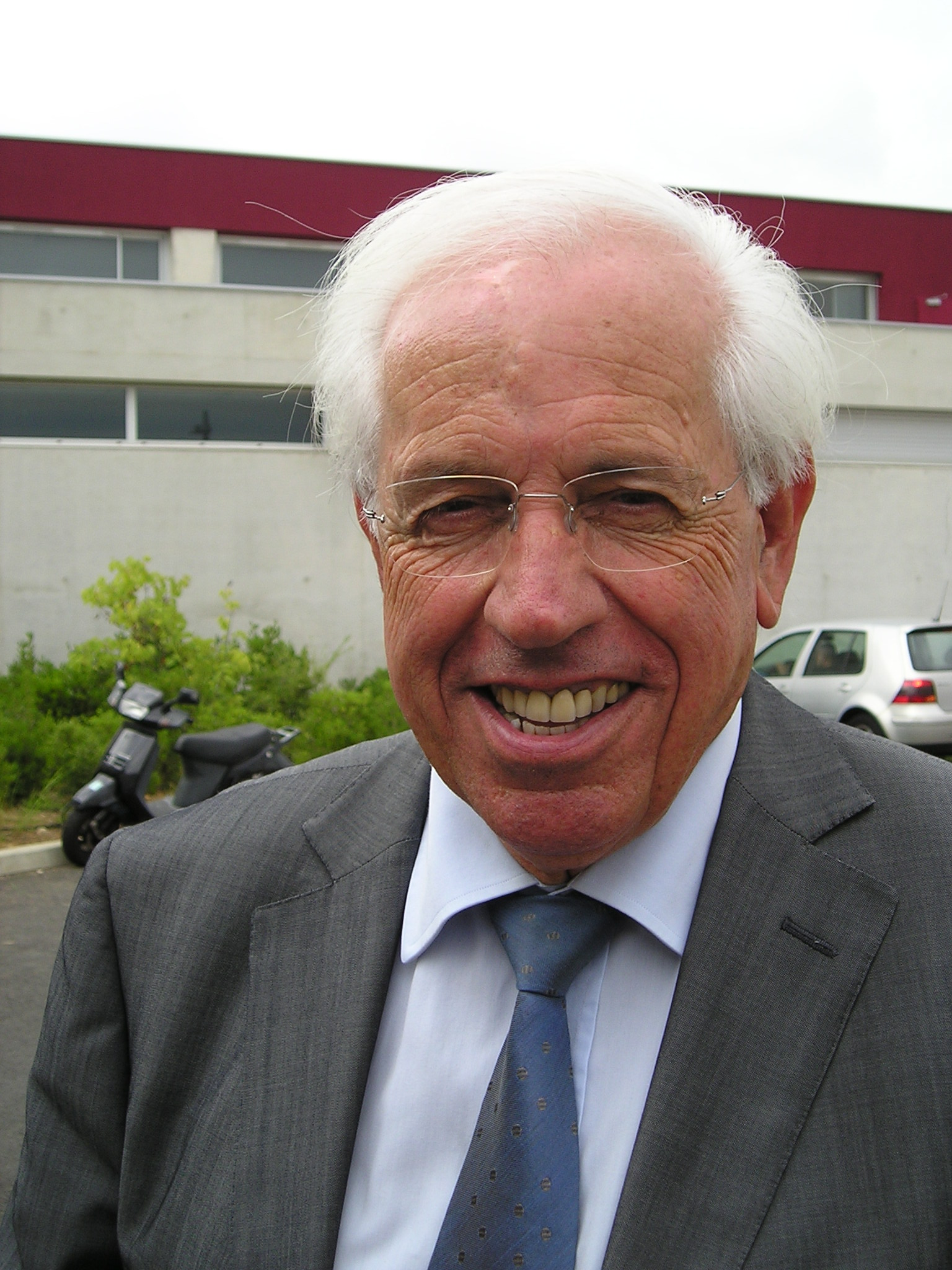
André Vézinhet in September 2009.

André Vézinhet (born 7 September 1939) is a French politician, member of the Socialist Party.

He was one of the socialists on Georges Frêche's list when the latter became Mayor of Montpellier in 1977.

Senator between 1989 and 2007, he was then a deputy from 2007 to 2012 in the National Assembly of France where he represented the Hérault department's 2nd constituency in the Socialist, Radical, Citizen and Miscellaneous Left parliamentary group.

His main role is in the department of Hérault where he has been sitting in the Council General since 1985 and is its President since 1998.
