= Jean-François Eliaou =

French politician (born 1956)

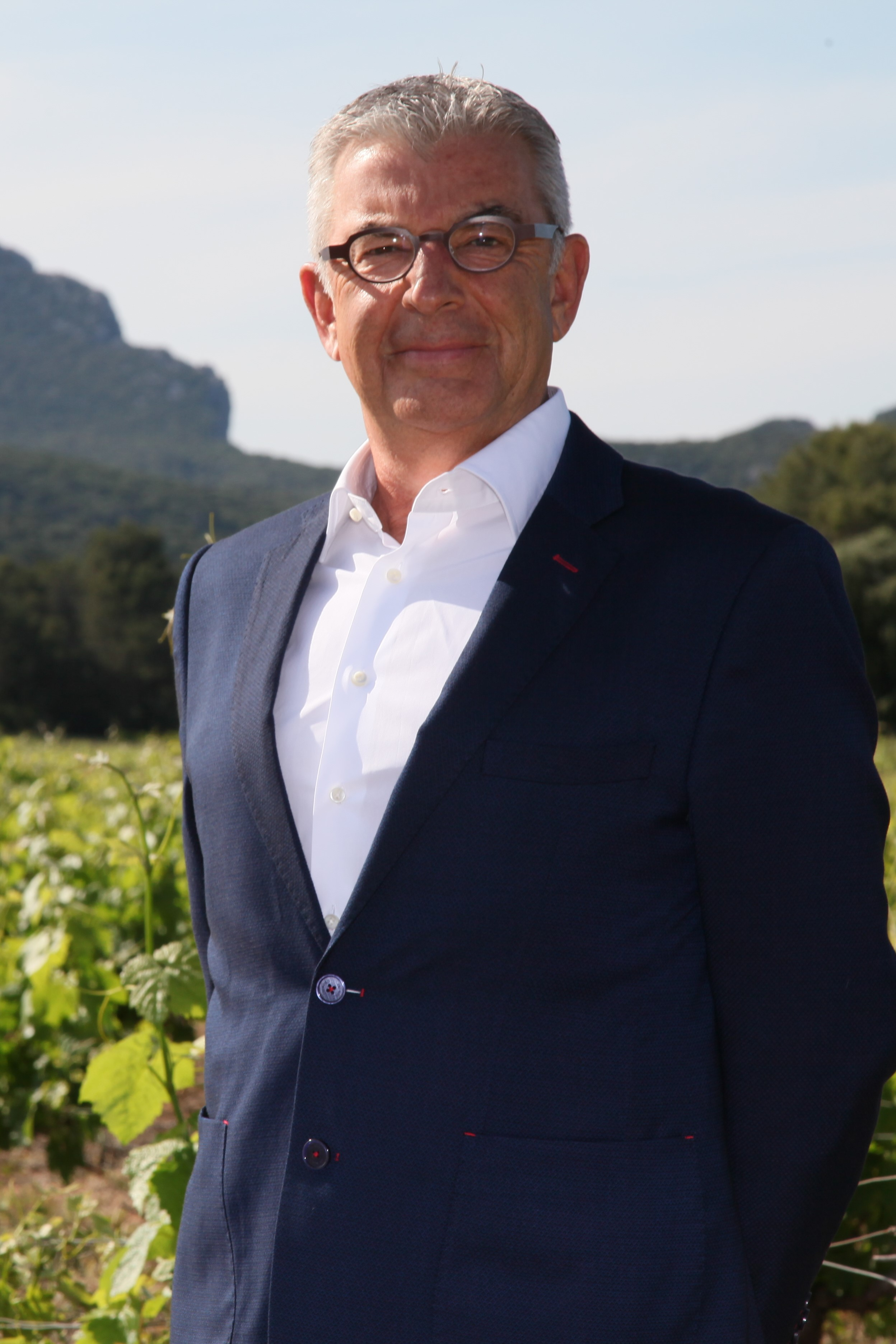

Member of the National Assembly for Hérault's 4th constituency
- In office 21 June 2017 – June 2022
- Preceded by: Frédéric Roig
- Succeeded by: Sébastien Rome

Personal details
- Born: 13 August 1956 (age 70) Nice
- Party: Renaissance
- Education: University of Montpellier

Jean-François Eliaou (born 13 August 1956) is a French politician who served as a member of the National Assembly from 2017 to 2022, representing the department of Hérault. He is a member of Renaissance (RE).

== Early career ==
Eliaou is a pediatrician who is a member of the Cancer Research Institute of Montpellier, a professor at the Faculty of Medicine at Montpellier.

== Political career ==
In parliament, Eliaou served as member of the Committee on Legal Affairs and the Parliamentary Office for the Evaluation of Scientific and Technological Choices (OPECST). In addition to his committee assignments, he was a member of the French-Japanese Parliamentary Friendship Group.

In 2019, Eliaou steered through parliament a bioethics law extending to homosexual and single women free access to fertility treatments such as in vitro fertilisation (IVF) under France's national health insurance; it was one of the campaign promises of President Emmanuel Macron and marked the first major social reform of his five-year term.

In 2021, Eliaou and Antoine Savignat jointly wrote a parliamentary report on the situation of unaccompanied minors in France's criminal law.

He lost his seat in the first round of the 2022 French legislative election.
