= Sébastien Rome =

French politician (born 1978)

Member of the National Assembly for Hérault's 4th constituency
- In office 20 June 2022 – 9 June 2024
- Preceded by: Jean-François Eliaou
- Succeeded by: Manon Bouquin

Personal details
- Born: 12 October 1978 (age 47) Nîmes, France
- Party: La France Insoumise

Sébastien Rome (born 12 October 1978) is a French politician from La France Insoumise. He was the Member of Parliament for Hérault's 4th constituency from 2022 to 2024.

== See also ==
- List of deputies of the 16th National Assembly of France
