= Jacques Blanc =

French politician

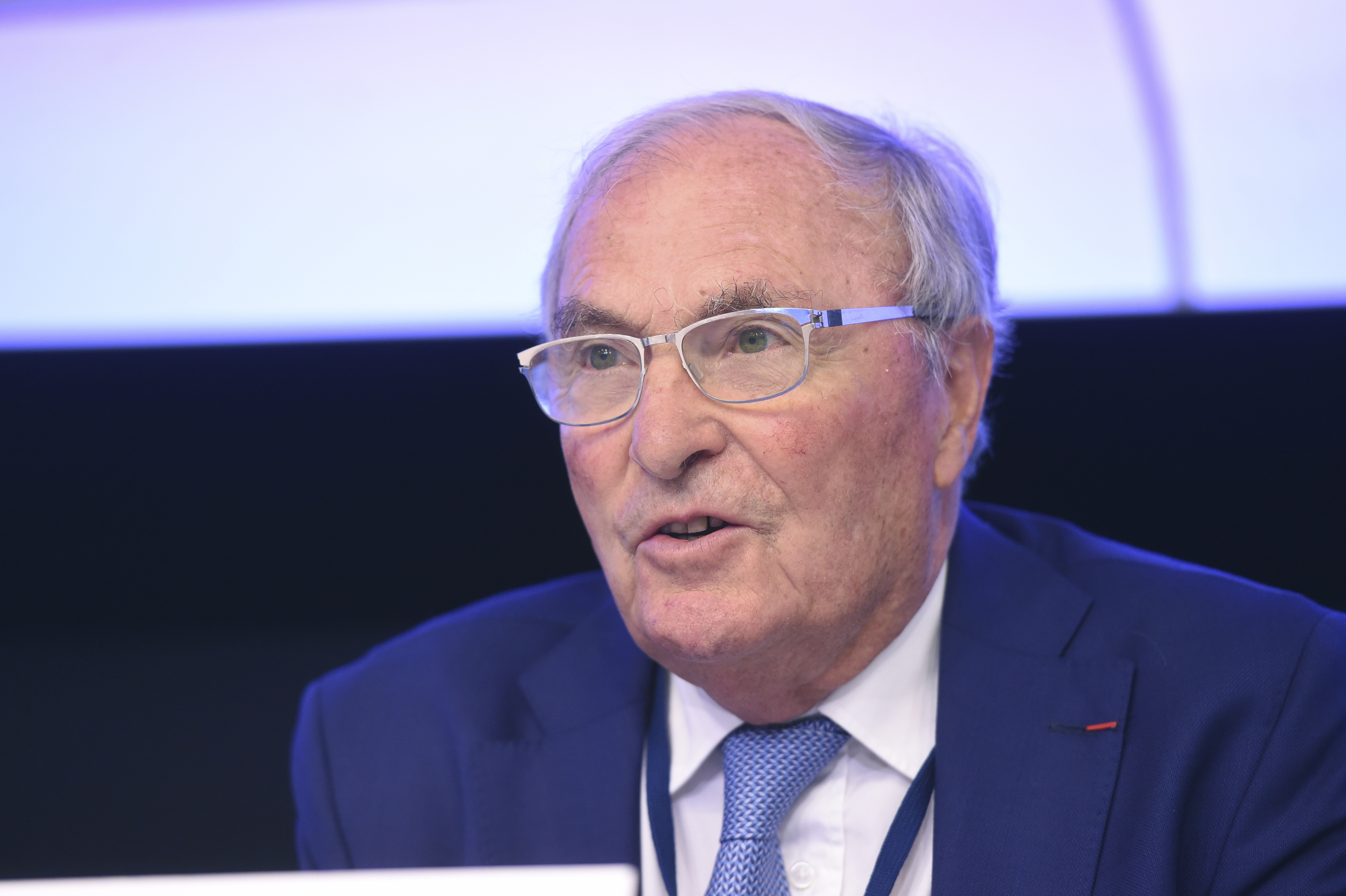

Senator
- In office 1 October 2001 – 25 September 2011
- Constituency: Lozère

President of the Languedoc-Roussillion Region
- In office 1986–2004
- Succeeded by: Georges Frêche

Member of the National Assembly
- In office 2 April 1973 – 30 September 2001
- Constituency: Lozère (2nd district)

Personal details
- Born: 21 October 1939 (age 87) Rodez, Aveyron, France
- Party: Union for a Popular Movement (UMP)
- Profession: neuropsychiatrist

Jacques Blanc (French pronunciation: [ʒak blɑ̃]; born 21 October 1939) is a French politician and former senator for the Lozère department. He is also mayor of La Canourgue and president of the Aubrac-Lot-Causse communauté de communes. He is a member of the Union for a Popular Movement (UMP).

Blanc was president of the Languedoc-Roussillon Region from 1986 to 2004. His final mandate proved controversial, as the Socialist Party won more seats (although short of an absolute majority) in the 1998 elections for the regional council than Blanc's RPR list: Blanc had to rely on the votes of the far-right National Front councillors to remain president.

Blanc was also député for the 2nd district of Lozère (the western part of the department) in the National Assembly from 2 April 1973 until his elevation to the Senate on 1 October 2001, except for the period 29 March 1977 – 31 March 1978 when he served in Raymond Barre's government as Secretary of State for Agriculture. On 25 September 2011, he lost the senatorial reelection (he was elected in 2001). Alain Bertrand, the leftist Mayor of Mende, Lozère, was elected in his place.
