= Alain Jamet =

French politician (1934–2025)

Alain Jamet (25 May 1934 – 28 November 2025) was a French politician. He was a co-founder of the National Front in 1972. Jamet died on 28 November 2025, at the age of 91.

== Honours and awards ==
- Cross for Military Valour
- Combatant's Cross
