= Fanny Dombre-Coste =

French politician

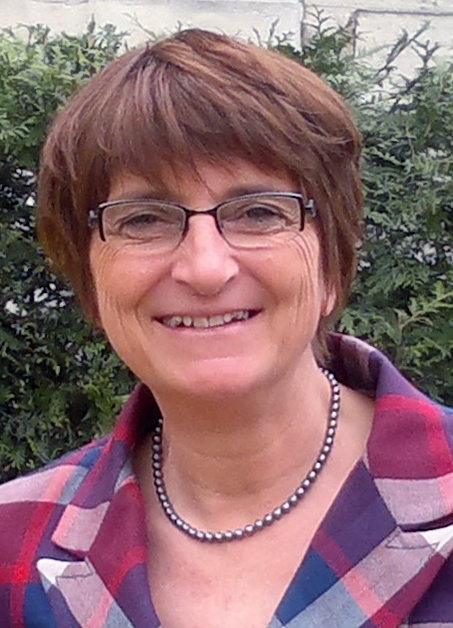
- Fanny Dombre-Coste in 2012

Member of the National Assembly for Hérault's 3rd constituency
- Incumbent
- Assumed office 18 July 2024
- Preceded by: Laurence Cristol
- In office 20 June 2012 – 20 June 2017
- Preceded by: Jean-Pierre Grand
- Succeeded by: Coralie Dubost

Personal details
- Born: Fanny Dombre; 26 December 1956 (age 69) Sainte-Adresse, France
- Party: Socialist Party
- Children: 2
- Education: École des Gobelins
- Profession: Photograph

Fanny Dombre-Coste (née Dombre; born 26 December 1956) is a French Socialist politician who was Member of Parliament for Hérault's 3rd constituency from 2012 to 2017.

== Political career ==
She lost her seat to Coralie Dubost of La République En Marche! in the 2017 French legislative election.

== Family ==
Her mother's cousin was Louise Weiss, the famous feminist.

== See also ==
- List of deputies of the 14th National Assembly of France
