= Nathalie Oziol =

French politician

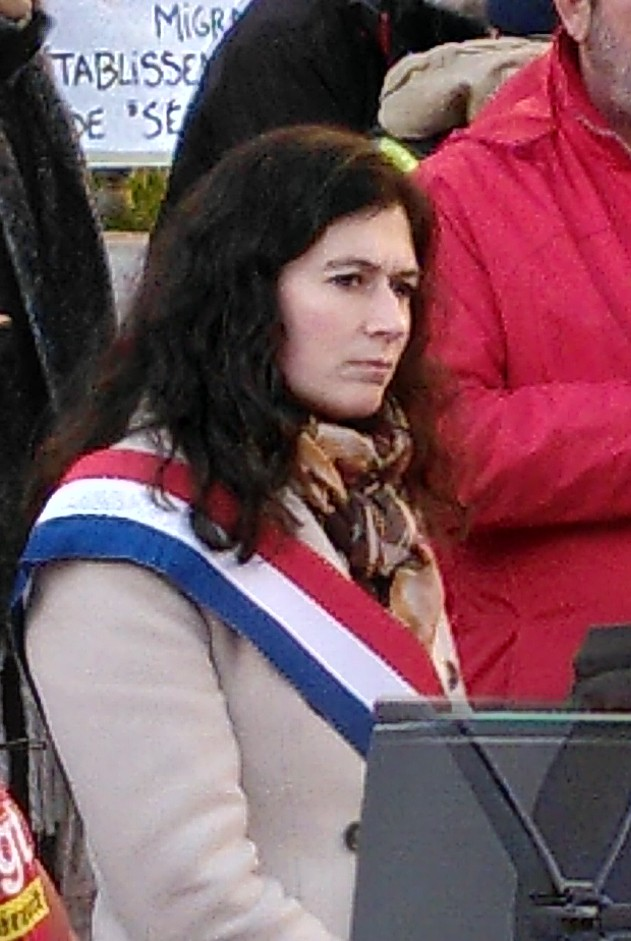

Member of the National Assembly for Hérault's 2nd constituency
- Incumbent
- Assumed office 22 June 2022
- Preceded by: Muriel Ressiguier

Personal details
- Born: 18 February 1990 (age 36) Toulouse, France
- Party: La France Insoumise
- Occupation: Teacher, Politician

Nathalie Oziol (born 18 February 1990) is a French politician from La France Insoumise. She was elected as a deputy for Hérault's 2nd constituency in the 2022 French legislative election.

== Controversy ==
Nathalie Oziol objects to calling Abdoullakh Anzorov who murdered French teacher Samuel Paty to "avenge the prophet" a "muslim fanatic".

She accused reporter Charlotte Belaïche of Libération of lying before the newspaper posted online the video where she is seen making that declaration to a group of Muslim supporters of La France Insoumise called "Oumma Montpellier".

== See also ==
- List of deputies of the 16th National Assembly of France
