= Jean-Louis Roumégas =

French politician

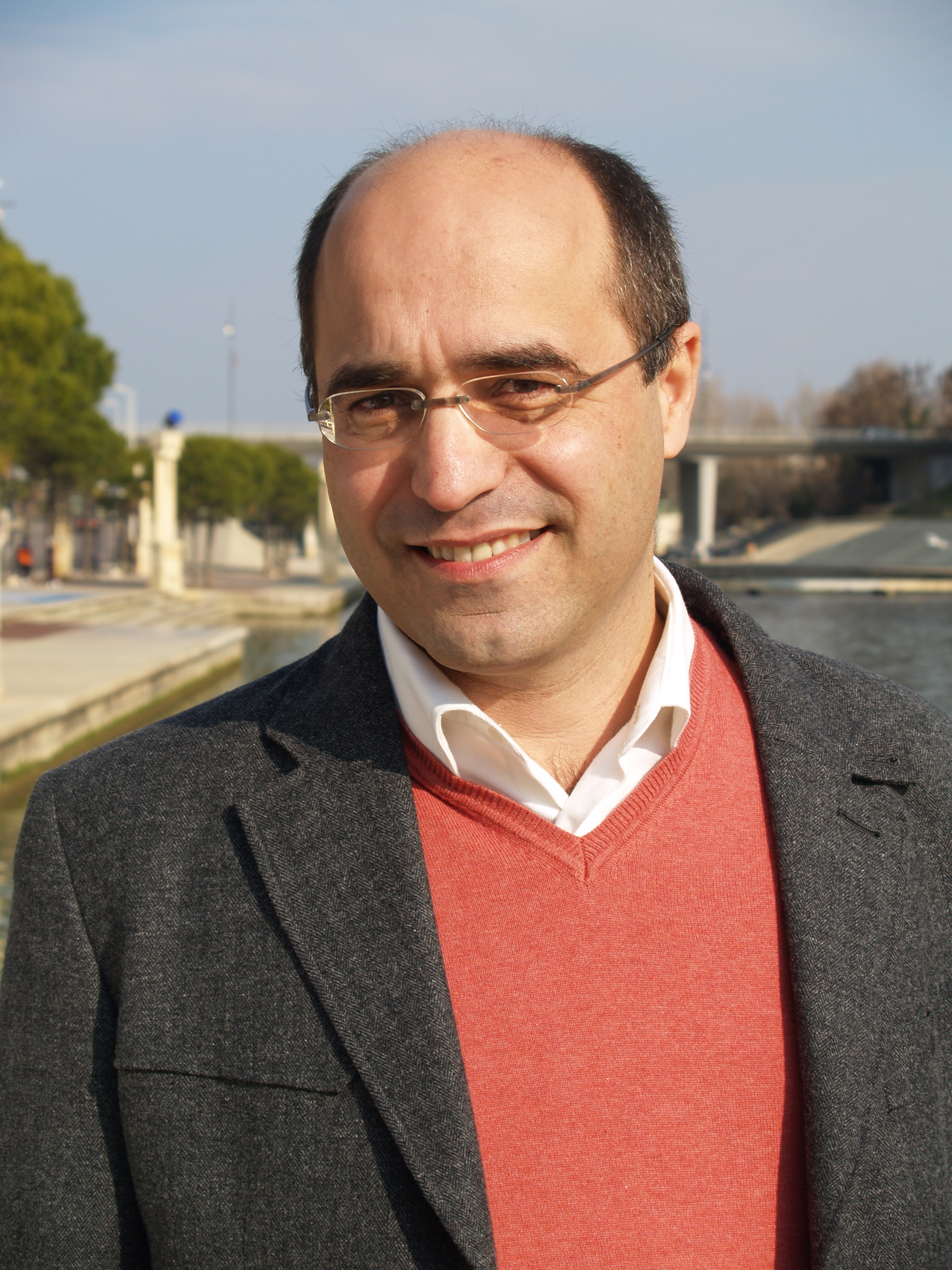

Member of the National Assembly for Hérault's 1st constituency
- Incumbent
- Assumed office 8 July 2024
- Preceded by: Philippe Sorez
- In office 20 June 2012 – 20 June 2017
- Preceded by: Jacques Domergue
- Succeeded by: Patricia Mirallès

Personal details
- Born: 6 June 1962 (age 64) Algiers, Algeria
- Party: Europe Ecology – The Greens
- Education: Paul Valéry University Montpellier 3

Jean-Louis Roumégas (born 6 June 1962) is a French politician who was elected as a member of the National Assembly representing the 1st district of Hérault from 2012 to 2017 and again since July 2024. He is a member of the Ecologists group in the National Assembly.

During his political career Roumégas has been the spokesman of Europe Ecologie les Verts (EELV) from 2008 to 2011. He has also been part of the mayor–council government system of Montpellier from 2001 to 2011. In June 2012 Roumégas won 50.1% of the popular vote in the first constituency of Hérault and became member of the National Assembly of France.

In the 2017 election he was defeated in the first round, gaining only 10.7% of the vote.

In the 2024 French legislative election he ran again with the endorsement of the New Popular Front and was subsequently elected.

== Early life ==
Jean-Louis Roumégas was born in Algiers, Algeria in 1962. He was raised in Montpellier and then in Pyrénées-Orientales.

Roumégas enrolled at the Paul Valéry University Montpellier 3, where he majored in philosophy and Literature. Some years later he started teaching at the same university. Now he is an active member of different organizations of childhood's rights.

== Political career ==
His first steps in politic were aimed at defending the human rights in Morocco, as an activist of the "House of the Third World" an organization who helps political prisoners in that country.

In 1992, he became member of the French Ecologist Movement. Then in 2001 he was elected counselor of ecological development. In 2012, during the politic campaigns he was elected deputy in the National Assembly, representing the 1th district of Montpellier city. Since his arrive to the assembly Roumégas has worked in several ecological and economic programs contributing to the regional development in Languedoc-Roussillon. He is spokesperson for the Greens and municipal councillor in Montpellier.

In 2009, he was selected to be The Greens-Europe Écologie's candidate in Languedoc-Roussillon for the 2010 regional elections.
