= Jean-Pierre Grand =

French politician

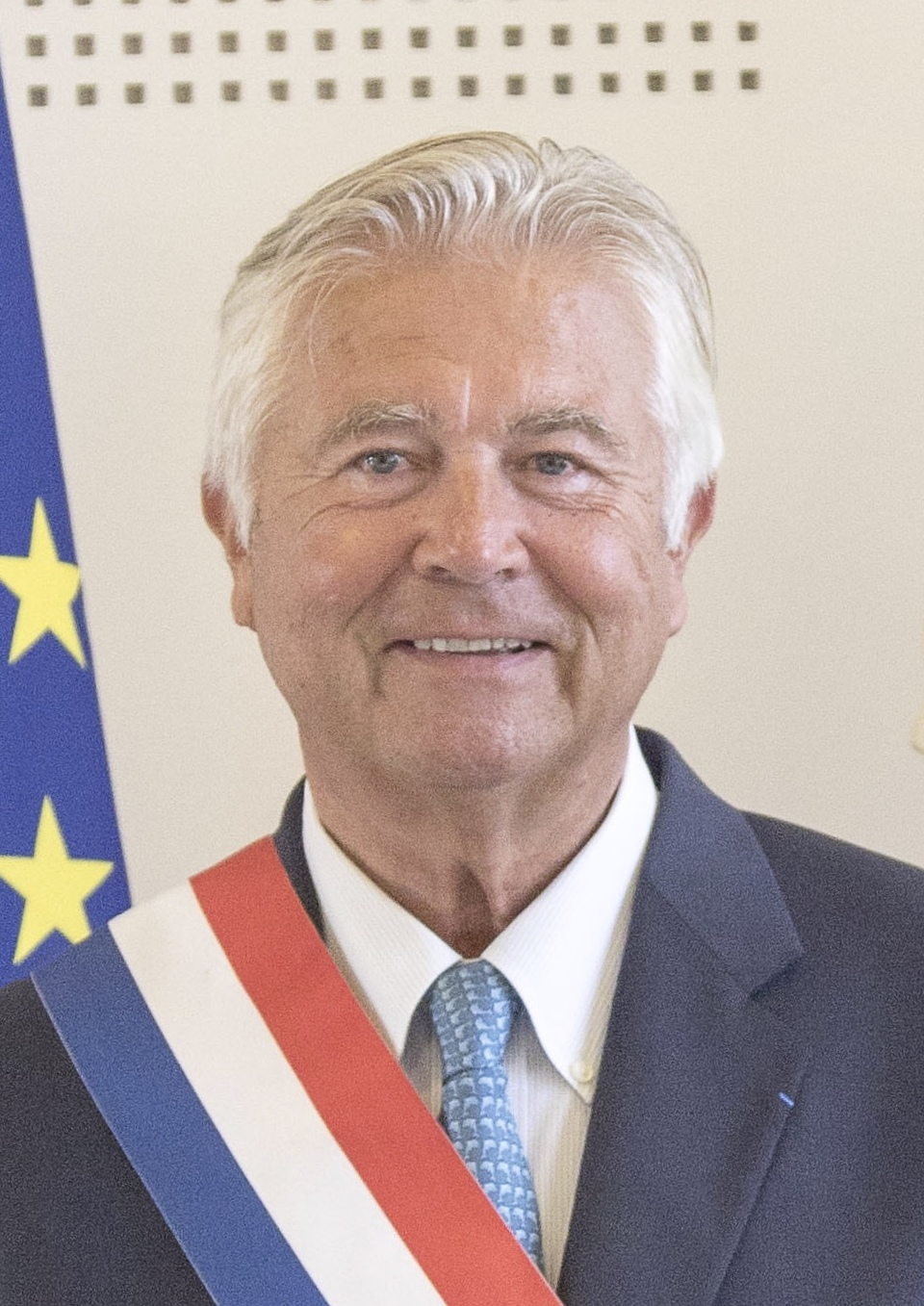

Senator for Hérault
- In office 1 October 2014 – 27 September 2026

Mayor of Castelnau-le-Lez
- In office 14 March 1983 – 30 September 2017
- Preceded by: Pierre Varray
- Succeeded by: Frédéric Lafforgue

Member of the National Assembly for Hérault's 3rd constituency
- In office 19 June 2002 – 19 June 2012
- Preceded by: Christine Lazerges
- Succeeded by: Fanny Dombre-Coste

Personal details
- Born: 18 November 1950 (age 75) Montpellier, France
- Party: Horizons (after 2021)
- Other political affiliations: RPR (until 2002); UPM (2002–2015); RS (2010–2012); LR (2015–2019)

Jean-Pierre Grand (born 18 November 1950) is a French politician. He was a senator for Hérault from 2014 to 2026, the mayor of Castelnau-Le-Lez from 1977 to 2017, and was a member of the National Assembly from 2002 to 2012.

Jean-Pierre Grand was an assistant to Jacques Chaban-Delmas, who was his political mentor. He was elected a member of the National Assembly on 16 June 2002, for the 12th legislature (2002–2007), in the Hérault's 3rd constituency. He was re-elected on 17 June 2007 for another 5 years. He was formerly a member of the Union for a Popular Movement (UMP).

Grand openly supported De Villepin as a potential candidate for the 2007 French presidential election against the former president of UMP who was ultimately elected president, Nicolas Sarkozy. In 2007, he was suspended by UMP. On 9 October 2021, Grand was present in Le Havre for the launch of the Horizons party founded by Édouard Philippe, the former prime minister. He lost in the 2026 French Senate elections in Hérault.
