= France Jamet =

French politician (born 1961)

France Jamet (born 1961) is a French politician and a member of National Rally. She has been serving as a Member of the European Parliament (MEP) since 2017.

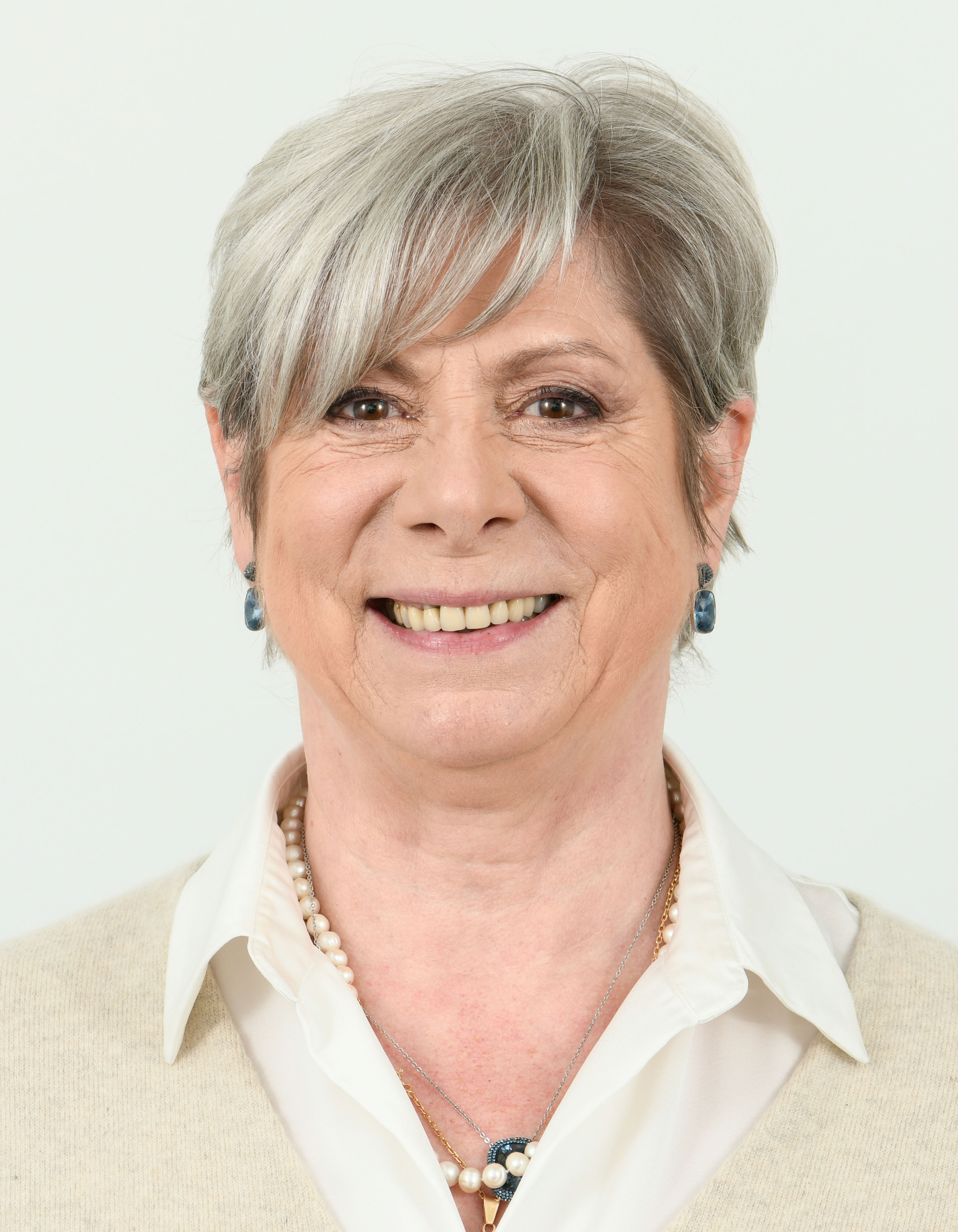

She is an FN regional councillor in the Languedoc-Roussillon region, elected in 2004 on a list led by her father, Alain Jamet. In 2009 she was selected to be National Front's candidate in the Languedoc-Roussillon region for the 2010 regional elections. She unsuccessfully contested Hérault's 1st constituency at the Legislative elections in 2017 and 2022.

Jamet is the niece of French journalist Dominique Jamet.
