= Christian Bourquin =

French politician

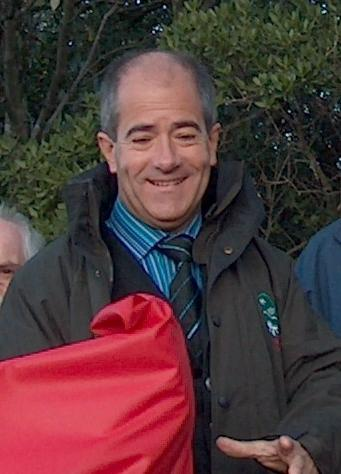
- Christian Bourquin (2007)

President of the Regional Council of Languedoc-Roussillon
- In office 2010–2014
- Preceded by: Georges Frêche
- Succeeded by: Damien Alary

Personal details
- Born: 7 October 1954 Saint-Féliu-d'Amont, France
- Died: 26 August 2014 (aged 59) Montpellier, France
- Party: Socialist Party

Christian Bourquin (French pronunciation: [kʁistjɑ̃ buʁkɛ̃]; 7 October 1954 – 26 August 2014) was a French politician, a member of the Socialist Party. He was the president of the Regional Council of Languedoc-Roussillon from 2010 to his death in August 2014.

== Biography ==
Bourquin was born at Saint-Féliu-d'Amont, Pyrenees-Orientales. He was elected Mayor of Millas in 1995, holding the post until 2001. Bourquin died of cancer, aged 59, at Montpellier, Hérault.

== Elected office ==
- Deputy in the French National Assembly for the 3rd canton of Pyrénées-Orientales (1997 to 2002)
- Member of the PS National Office (2005 to 2008)
- General council of Pyrénées-Orientales Canton of Millas, from 1994 to 2010.
- Chairman of the General Council of the Pyrénées-Orientales, from 1998 to 2010.
- 1st vice-president of the Regional Council of Languedoc-Roussillon in charge of Finance from 2004 to 2010.
- After the death of Georges Frêche, president of the Languedoc-Roussillon region, in October 2010, six months after his reelection, Christian Bourquin was elected president.
- In September 2010, Bourquin was elected as senator for Pyrénées-Orientales constituency.
