= Pompignan, Gard =

Pompignan Pompinhan (Occitan)
- Commune
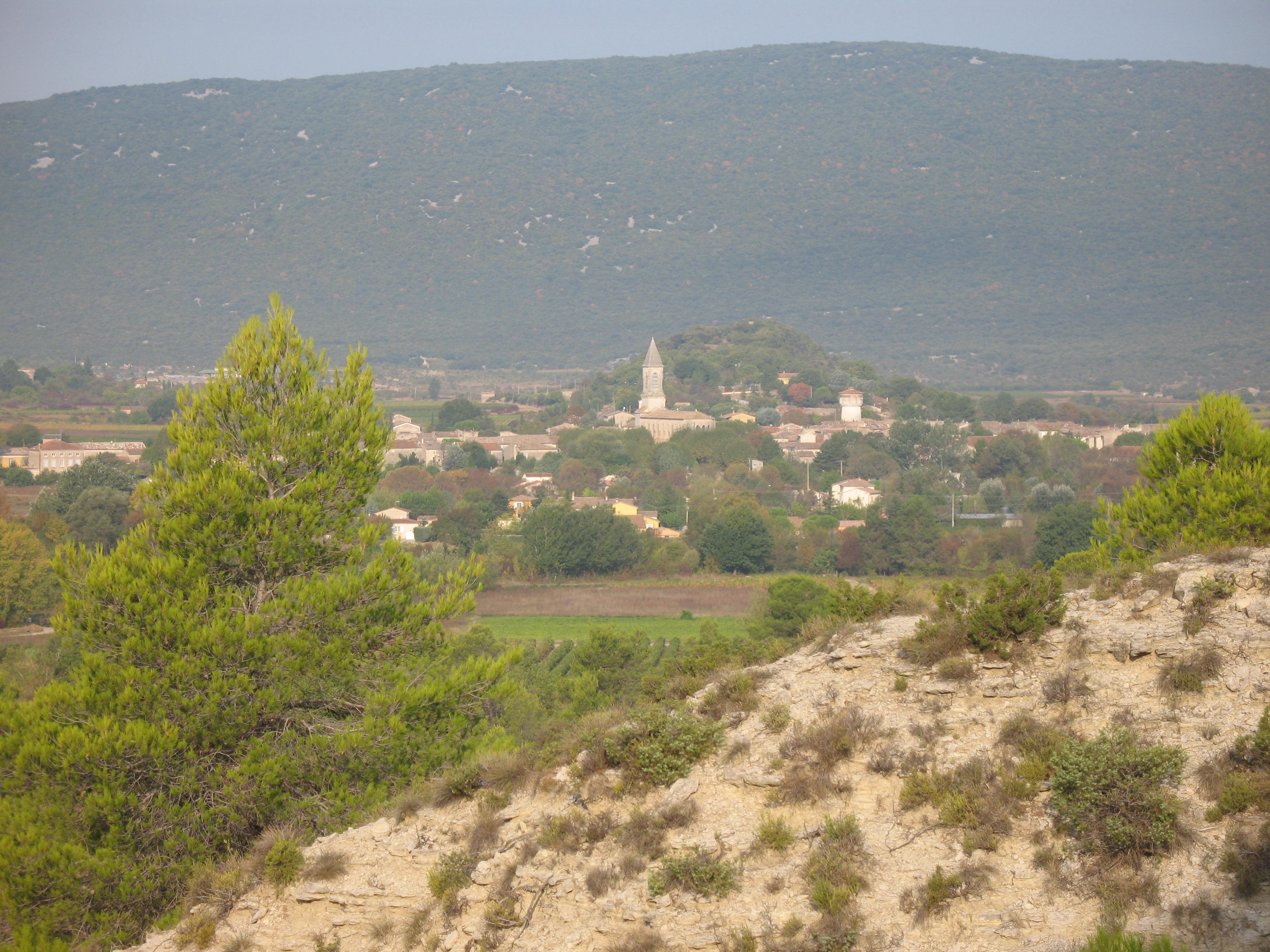
- A general view of Pompignan

- Coat of arms
- Location of Pompignan
- Location within France Location within Occitanie
- Coordinates: 43°53′42″N 3°51′24″E
- Country: France
- Region: Occitania
- Department: Gard
- Arrondissement: Le Vigan
- Canton: Le Vigan

Government
  - Mayor (2020–2026): Michel Fougairolle
- Area^{1}: 41.31 km^{2} (15.95 sq mi)
- Elevation: 193 m (633 ft)
- Highest elevation: 522 m (1,713 ft)
- Lowest elevation: 153 m (502 ft)
- Population (2023): 908
  - Density: 22.0/km^{2} (56.9/sq mi)
- Time zone: UTC+01:00 (CET)
  - Summer (DST): UTC+02:00 (CEST)
- INSEE/Postal code: 30200 /30170
- ^{1} French Land Register data, which excludes lakes, ponds, glaciers > 1 km^{2} (0.386 sq mi or 247 acres) and river estuaries.

Pompignan (French pronunciation: [pɔ̃piɲɑ̃]; Occitan: Pompinhan) is a commune in the Gard department in the Occitania region of Southern France. It is situated on the departmental border with Hérault, 30 km (18.6 mi) north of Montpellier.

== Demographics ==
Historical population
Year	Pop.	±% p.a.
1968	619	—
1975	582	−0.88%
1982	576	−0.15%
1990	611	+0.74%
1999	651	+0.71%
2007	784	+2.35%
2012	862	+1.92%
2017	957	+2.11%
2023	908	−0.87%
Source: INSEE

== Notable people ==
- Jean-Jacques Lefranc, Marquis de Pompignan (1709–1784), French writer and nobleman
- Hinaupoko Deveze (born 2002), Miss France 2026
- John Stuart Mill (1806–1873), English philosopher
- Dick Rivers (1945–2019), French singer and actor

== See also ==
- Communes of the Gard department
