= Laurence Cristol =

French politician

Member of the National Assembly for Hérault's 3rd constituency
- In office 22 June 2022 – 9 June 2024
- Preceded by: Coralie Dubost
- Succeeded by: Fanny Dombre-Coste

Member of the departmental council of Hérault
- Incumbent
- Assumed office 2 April 2015
- Constituency: Canton of Saint-Gély-du-Fesc

Mayor of Saint-Clément-de-Rivière
- In office 1 May 2018 – 23 August 2022
- Preceded by: Rodolphe Cayzac
- Succeeded by: Françoise Lesaunier

Personal details
- Born: 8 November 1967 (age 58) Montpellier, France
- Party: Renaissance (2022–present)
- Other political affiliations: The Republicans (2016–2022)

Laurence Cristol (born 8 November 1967) is a French politician of Renaissance (RE) who served as a member of the National Assembly for Hérault's 3rd constituency from 2022 to 2024.

== Biography ==
Laurence Cristol is a geriatrician specializing in Oncology at the Montpellier Regional Cancer Institute (Val d'Aurelle). She has been married since 1992 to Jean-Paul Cristol, a university professor and hospital practitioner at Montpellier University Hospital. Together they have four children born between 1994 and 2005.

She was appointed Knight of the Ordre national du Mérite on July 10, 2021 for “her exemplary professional career as a geriatric oncologist, her research activities in geriatric oncology, her involvement in community life, her training activities for caregivers and students, her supervision of theses, and her chairing and moderating of conference sessions.”

She is one of the parliamentarians who holds shares in the multinational TotalEnergies (worth around €8,700), which raises ethical and political questions, particularly during debates and votes in the Assembly relating to climate change, rising fuel prices, and taxes on superprofits. For France 3, the fact that she sits on the Social Affairs Committee makes her situation less problematic than that of some of her colleagues who sit on committees more directly involved in energy issues.
