= Georges Frêche =

French politician (1938–2010)

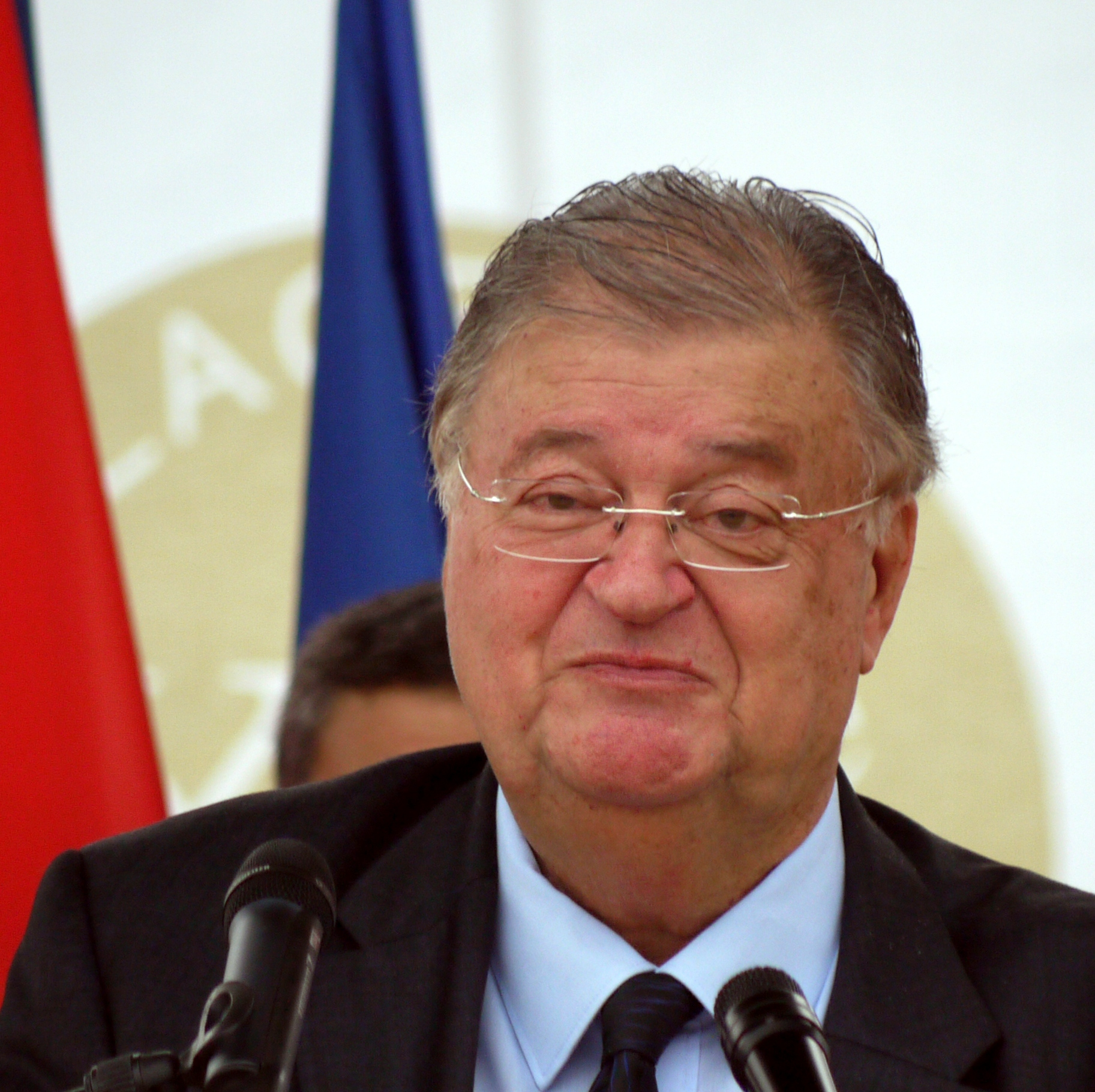

President of the Regional Council of Languedoc-Roussillon
- In office 2004–2010
- Preceded by: Jacques Blanc
- Succeeded by: Christian Bourquin

Mayor of Montpellier
- In office 1977–2004
- Preceded by: François Delmas
- Succeeded by: Hélène Mandroux

Member of the National Assembly
- In office 1997–2002
- Preceded by: Bernard Serrou
- Succeeded by: Jacques Domergue
- In office 1981–1993
- Preceded by: Robert-Félix Fabre
- Succeeded by: Bernard Serrou
- In office 1973–1978
- Preceded by: René Couveinhes
- Succeeded by: François Delmas
- Constituency: Hérault (1st & 2nd districts)

Personal details
- Born: July 9, 1938 Puylaurens, Tarn, France
- Died: October 24, 2010 (aged 72) Montpellier, France
- Cause of death: Heart attack
- Party: Socialist Party (expelled 2007)
- Children: five daughters
- Education: Lycée Stanislas
- Alma mater: HEC Paris; Paris Law Faculty
- Profession: University professor

Georges Frêche (French pronunciation: [ʒɔʁʒ fʁɛʃ]; July 9, 1938 – October 24, 2010) was a French politician. He served as President of the Languedoc-Roussillon Region from 2004 until his death: prior to that, he had been mayor of Montpellier for 27 years, and was also a former member (député) of the National Assembly. Frêche had been a member of the French Socialist Party until he was expelled on January 27, 2007.

A long-time political figure within French political circles, Frêche was an extremely controversial character, considered by some a great builder and visionary, while criticised by others and judged in court for his controversial remarks, which were sometimes interpreted as racist.

== Life and career ==
Frêche was born in Puylaurens, Tarn, in 1938. His father was a military officer, while his mother was a primary school headmistress. Frêche studied law in Paris, and was appointed professor of law at the University of Montpellier 1 in 1969, specializing in Roman law, before entering politics.

He served as the mayor of Montpellier from 1977 to 2004. Building on the trend started by his predecessor François Delmas, who landed the Southern Europe IBM factory and headquarters as well as the scientific university, Frêche expanded Montpellier in all directions, propelling it from the 25th-largest city in France to the eighth, in less than 30 years. Under Frêche, Montpellier, whose slogan, in the 1980s, reflecting Frêche's ambition, was "the overachiever", specialised in clean, tertiary industries such as banking, electronics and water processing. In 2004, Frêche was elected president of the Languedoc-Roussillon Region, and had to resign as mayor of Montpellier after 27 years in office, although he remained president of Montpellier Agglomération, the local agglomeration community.

While he was a member of French's Socialist Party (PS) and the leader of one of the largest socialist federations in France, Georges Frêche was never given a ministerial position in any socialist government, not even as socialist François Mitterrand was France's president for 14 years. This could have been due to both the fact that Frêche was an embarrassing figure for the socialists, prone to multiple politically incorrect speeches with racist overtones, and his alleged refusal to let the Socialist Party be secretly financed by fake bills issued by the private company Urba (Urba would cause a political scandal in France). He had antagonized François Mitterrand as early as the foundation of the current French Socialist Party in 1971, being cast aside even at that date.

Frêche was permanently expelled from the Socialist Party on January 27, 2007, after commenting that the number of black players on the France national football team was disproportionately higher than one might expect from France's demographics. Frêche maintained that he was not trying to be racist and was instead talking about whites being less successful at sports because they are not sufficiently "hungry".

Frêche continued to attract controversy after his expulsion from the Socialist Party, insulting former Socialist Prime Minister Laurent Fabius in the run-up to the 2010 regional elections, saying "I've got a problem voting for that guy from Haute-Normandie, he doesn't look too Catholic" (Fabius has Ashkenazi Jewish roots). The Socialist Party ran against Frêche's "independent left" list in the elections for Languedoc-Roussillon, with Frêche's successor as mayor of Montpellier, Hélène Mandroux as the head of list, but were roundly defeated, gaining only 7.74% in the first round, against Frêche's 34.28%. Frêche went on to easily win the three-way second round with 54.19%, against lists from the UMP (26.43%) and the FN (15.67%).

Frêche died of a heart attack in Montpellier on the afternoon of October 24, 2010, aged 72.

== Controversial comments ==
- July 1, 2000: "This is the longest tunnel in the world. You enter it in France and you come out in Ouarzazate", (Note: « Ici, c'est le tunnel le plus long du monde : vous entrez en France et vous sortez à Ouarzazate. ») a city in Morocco. Frêche was referring to the then-newly installed tramway line, of which one of the two terminus is in Montpellier's La Paillade, an area chiefly populated by citizens of Arab origin and Muslim religion.
- April, 2005: "I hope he does better than the other idiot", (Note: « J'espère qu'il sera meilleur que l'autre abruti. Celui-là, on le jugera sur le mariage des prêtres et la capote. ») referring to the election of the new pope Benedict XVI, replacing pope John-Paul II, the "idiot" in his sentence.
- February 11, 2006: Frêche referred to a group of former Harkis, (Muslim auxiliaries who served with the French army during the Algerian War of Independence), as "sub-humans". (Note: « Vous êtes vraiment d’une incurie incroyable. Vous ne connaissez pas l’histoire. Ah, vous êtes allés avec les gaullistes… Vous faites partie des harkis qui ont vocation à être cocus toute leur vie… Faut-il vous rappeler que 80 000 harkis se sont fait égorger comme des porcs parce que l'armée française les a laissés ? Moi qui vous ai donné votre boulot de pompier, gardez-le et fermez votre gueule ! Je vous ai trouvé un toit et je suis bien remercié. Arrêtez-vous ! Arrêtez-vous ! Allez avec les gaullistes ! Allez avec les gaullistes à Palavas. Vous y serez très bien ! Ils ont massacré les vôtres en Algérie et vous allez leur lécher les bottes ! Mais vous n’avez rien du tout ! Vous êtes des sous-hommes ! Rien du tout ! Il faut que quelqu’un vous le dise ! Vous êtes sans honneur. Vous n’êtes pas capables de défendre les vôtres ! Voilà, voilà… Allez, dégagez ! ») They were taking part in a demonstration in support of the French law on colonialism, which asked teachers and textbooks to "acknowledge and recognise... the positive role of the French presence abroad, especially in North Africa", in Palavas-les-Flots.
- November 15, 2006: "On (the France national football team), there are 9 Blacks out of 11. The normal number would be three or four. This would reflect [French] society. But if there are so many, it is because Whites are lame. I'm ashamed for this country. Soon, there will be eleven blacks. When I see certain football teams, it makes me sad." (Note: « Dans cette équipe, il y a neuf blacks sur onze. La normalité serait qu'il y en ait trois ou quatre. Ce serait le reflet de la société. Mais, là, s'il y en a autant, c'est parce que les blancs sont nuls. J'ai honte pour ce pays. Bientôt, il y aura onze blacks. Quand je vois certaines équipes de foot, ça me fait de la peine. ») Frêche received support from political opponents such as Jean-Pierre Grand during the media storm that occurred after his outburst about the French football team.

== Electoral mandates ==
National Assembly of France
Member of the National Assembly of France for Hérault : 1973–1978 / 1981–1993 / 1997–2002. Elected in 1973, reelected in 1981, 1986, 1988, 1997.

Regional Council
President of the Regional Council of Languedoc-Roussillon : 2004–2010 (Died in 2010). Reelected in 2010
Vice-president of the Regional Council of Languedoc-Roussillon : 1973–1986.
Regional councillor of Languedoc-Roussillon : Since 1973. Elected in 1986, reelected in 1992, 1998, 2004, 2010.

Municipal Council
Mayor of Montpellier : 1977-2004 (Resignation). Reelected in 1983, 1989, 1995, 2001.
Municipal councillor of Montpellier : 1971–2010 (Died in 2010). Reelected in 1977, 1983, 1989, 1995, 2001, 2008.

Agglomeration community Council
President of the Agglomeration community of Montpellier Agglomération : 1977–2010 (Died in 2010). Reelected in 1983, 1989, 1995, 2001, 2008.
Member of the Agglomeration community of Montpellier Agglomération : 1977–2010 (Died in 2010). Reelected in 1983, 1989, 1995, 2001, 2008.
