= History of the Hindu–Arabic numeral system =

The Hindu–Arabic numeral system is a decimal place-value numeral system that uses a zero glyph as in "205". Some historians have argued that the exact development and transmission of the Hindu–Arabic numeral system remains debated, with differing interpretations regarding the contributions of Indian, Persian, and Arab scholars. Its glyphs are descended from the Indian Brahmi numerals. The full system emerged by the 8th to 9th centuries, and is first described outside India in Al-Khwarizmi's On the Calculation with Hindu Numerals (ca. 825), and second Al-Kindi's four-volume work On the Use of the Indian Numerals (c. 830). Today the name Hindu–Arabic numerals is usually used.

== Decimal system ==
Historians trace modern numerals in most languages to the Brahmi numerals, which were in use around the middle of the 3rd century BC. The place value system, however, developed later. The Brahmi numerals have been found in inscriptions in caves and on coins in regions near Pune, Maharashtra and Uttar Pradesh in India. These numerals (with slight variations) were in use up to the 4th century.

During the Gupta period (early 4th century to the late 6th century), the Gupta numerals developed from the Brahmi numerals and were spread over large areas by the Gupta empire as they conquered territory. Beginning around 7th century, the Gupta numerals developed into the Nagari numerals.

== Development in India ==
During the Vedic period (1500–500 BC), motivated by geometric construction of the fire altars and astronomy, the use of a numerical system and of basic mathematical operations developed in northern India. Hindu cosmology required the mastery of very large numbers such as the kalpa (the lifetime of the universe) said to be 4,320,000,000 years and the "orbit of the heaven" said to be 18,712,069,200,000,000 yojanas. Numbers were expressed using a "named place-value notation", using names for the powers of 10, like dasa, shatha, sahasra, ayuta, niyuta, prayuta, arbuda, nyarbuda, samudra, madhya, anta, parardha etc., the last of these being the name for a trillion (10^{12}). For example, the number 26,432 was expressed as "2 ayuta, 6 sahasra, 4 shatha, 3 dasa, 2." In the Buddhist text Lalitavistara, the Buddha is said to have narrated a scheme of numbers up to 10^{53}.

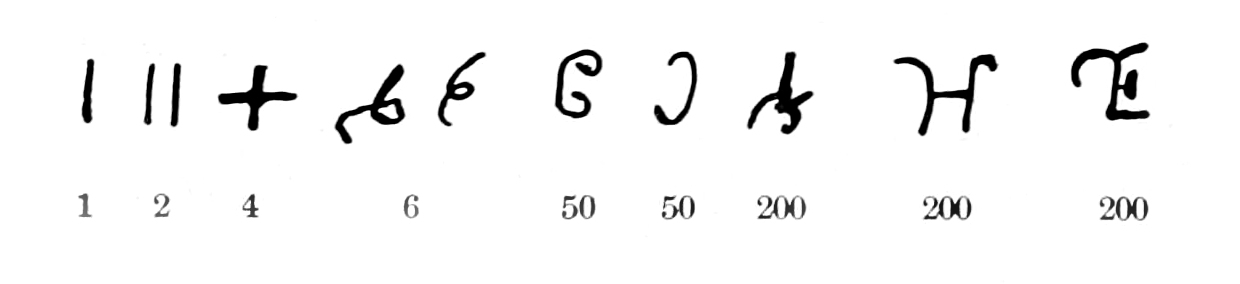
The first Brahmi numerals, ancestors of Hindu-Arabic numerals, used by Ashoka in his Edicts of Ashoka c. 250 BC.

The form of numerals in Ashoka's inscriptions in the Brahmi script (middle of the third century BC) involved separate signs for the numbers 1 to 9, 10 to 90, 100 and 1000. A multiple of 100 or 1000 was represented by a modification (or "enciphering") of the sign for the number using the sign for the multiplier number. Such enciphered numerals directly represented the named place-value numerals used verbally. They continued to be used in inscriptions until the end of the 9th century.

In his seminal text of 499 CE, Aryabhata devised the Āryabhaṭa numeration as a novel positional number system, using Sanskrit consonants for small numbers and vowels for powers of 10. Using the system, numbers up to a billion could be expressed using short phrases, e. g., khyu-ghṛ representing the number 4,320,000. The system did not catch on because it produced quite unpronounceable phrases, but it might have driven home the principle of positional number system (called dasa-gunottara, exponents of 10) to later mathematicians. A more elegant katapayadi scheme was devised in later centuries representing a place-value system including zero.

=== Place-value numerals without zero ===
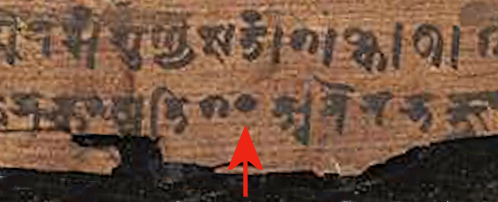
Bakhshali manuscript, detail of the dot "zero".

While the numerals in texts and inscriptions used a named place-value notation, a more efficient notation might have been employed in calculations, possibly from the 1st century AD. Computations were carried out on clay tablets covered with a thin layer of sand, giving rise to the term dhuli-karana ('sand-work') for higher computation. Karl Menninger believes that, in such computations, they must have dispensed with the enciphered numerals and written down just sequences of digits to represent the numbers. A zero would have been represented as a "missing place", such as a dot. The single manuscript with worked examples available to us, the Indian Bakhshali manuscript (most probably between 800 and 1100 CE), uses a place value system with a dot to denote the zero. The dot was called the shunya-sthāna 'empty-place'. The same symbol was also used in algebraic expressions for the unknown (as in the canonical x in modern algebra).

Textual references to a place-value system are seen from the 5th century onward. A commentary on Patanjali's Yoga Sutras from the 5th century reads, "Just as a line in the hundreds place [means] a hundred, in the tens place ten, and one in the ones place, so one and the same woman is called mother, daughter and sister."

A system called bhūta-sankhya ('object numbers' or 'concrete numbers') was employed for representing numerals in Sanskrit verses, by using a concept representing a digit to stand for the digit itself. The Jain text entitled the Lokavibhaga, dated 458, mentions the objectified numeral

"panchabhyah khalu shunyebhyah param dve sapta chambaram ekam trini cha rupam cha"

meaning 'five voids, then two and seven, the sky, one and three and the form', i.e., the number 13107200000. Such objectified numbers were used extensively from the 6th century onward, especially after Varāhamihira (c. 5th century). Zero is explicitly represented in such numbers as "the void" (sunya) or the "heaven-space" (ambara akasha). Correspondingly, the dot used in place of zero in written numerals was referred to as a sunya-bindu.

=== Place-value numerals with zero ===
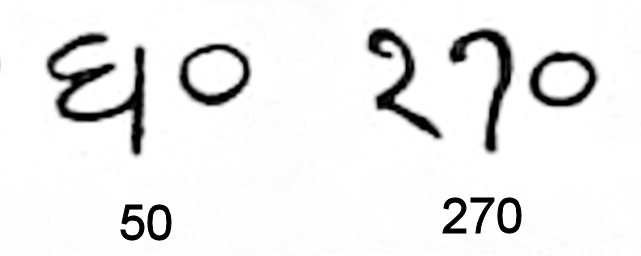
The numeral "zero" as it appears in two numbers (50 and 270) in an inscription in Gwalior. Dated to the 9th century.

In 628 CE, astronomer-mathematician Brahmagupta wrote his text Brahma Sphuta Siddhanta which contained the first mathematical treatment of zero. He defined zero as the result of subtracting a number from itself, postulated negative numbers and discussed their properties under arithmetical operations. His word for zero was shunya (void), the same term previously used for the empty spot in 9-digit place-value system. This provided a new perspective on the shunya-bindu as a numeral and paved the way for the eventual evolution of a zero digit. The dot continued to be used for at least 100 years afterwards, and transmitted to Southeast Asia and Arabia. Kashmir's Sharada script has retained the dot for zero until this day.

By the end of the 7th century, decimal numbers begin to appear in inscriptions in Southeast Asia as well as in India. Some scholars hold that they appeared even earlier. A 6th century copper-plate grant at Mankani bearing the numeral 346 (corresponding to 594 CE) is often cited. But its reliability is subject to dispute. The first indisputable occurrence of 0 in an inscription occurs at Gwalior in 876 CE, containing a numeral "270" in a notation surprisingly similar to the modern numerals. Throughout the 8th and 9th centuries, both the old Brahmi numerals and the new decimal numerals were used, sometimes appearing in the same inscriptions. In some documents, a transition is seen to occur around 866.

== Adoption by the Arabs ==
Before the rise of the Caliphate, the Hindu–Arabic numeral system was already moving West and was mentioned in Syria in 662 AD by the Syriac Nestorian scholar Severus Sebokht who wrote the following:

"I will omit all discussion of the science of the Indians, …, of their subtle discoveries in astronomy, discoveries that are more ingenious than those of the Greeks and the Babylonians, and of their valuable methods of calculation which surpass description. I wish only to say that this computation is done by means of nine signs. If those who believe, because they speak Greek, that they have arrived at the limits of science, would read the Indian texts, they would be convinced, even if a little late in the day, that there are others who know something of value."

According to Al-Qifti's History of Learned Men:

"... a person from India presented himself before the Caliph al-Mansur in the year [776 AD] who was well versed in the siddhanta method of calculation related to the movement of the heavenly bodies, and having ways of calculating equations based on the half-chord [essentially the sine] calculated in half-degrees … This is all contained in a work … from which he claimed to have taken the half-chord calculated for one minute. Al-Mansur ordered this book to be translated into Arabic, and a work to be written, based on the translation, to give the Arabs a solid base for calculating the movements of the planets …"

The work was most likely to have been Brahmagupta's Brāhmasphuṭasiddhānta (The Opening of the Universe) which was written in 628.

In his text The Arithmetic of Al-Uqlîdisî (Dordrecht: D. Reidel, 1978), A.S. Saidan's studies were unable to answer in full how the numerals reached the Arab world:

"It seems plausible that it drifted gradually, probably before the 7th century, through two channels, one starting from Sind, undergoing Persian filtration and spreading in what is now known as the Middle East, and the other starting from the coasts of the Indian Ocean and extending to the southern coasts of the Mediterranean."

Al-Uqlidisi developed a notation to represent decimal fractions. The numerals came to fame due to their use in the pivotal work of the Persian mathematician Al-Khwarizmi, whose book On the Calculation with Hindu Numerals was written about 825, and the Arab mathematician Al-Kindi, who wrote four volumes (see [2]) "On the Use of the Indian Numerals" (Ketab fi Isti'mal al-'Adad al-Hindi) about 830. They, amongst other works, contributed to the diffusion of the Indian system of numeration in the Middle East and the West.

== Development of symbols ==
The development of the numerals in early Europe is shown below:

"Histoire de la Mathematique" by the French scholar J.E. Montucla, published in 1757

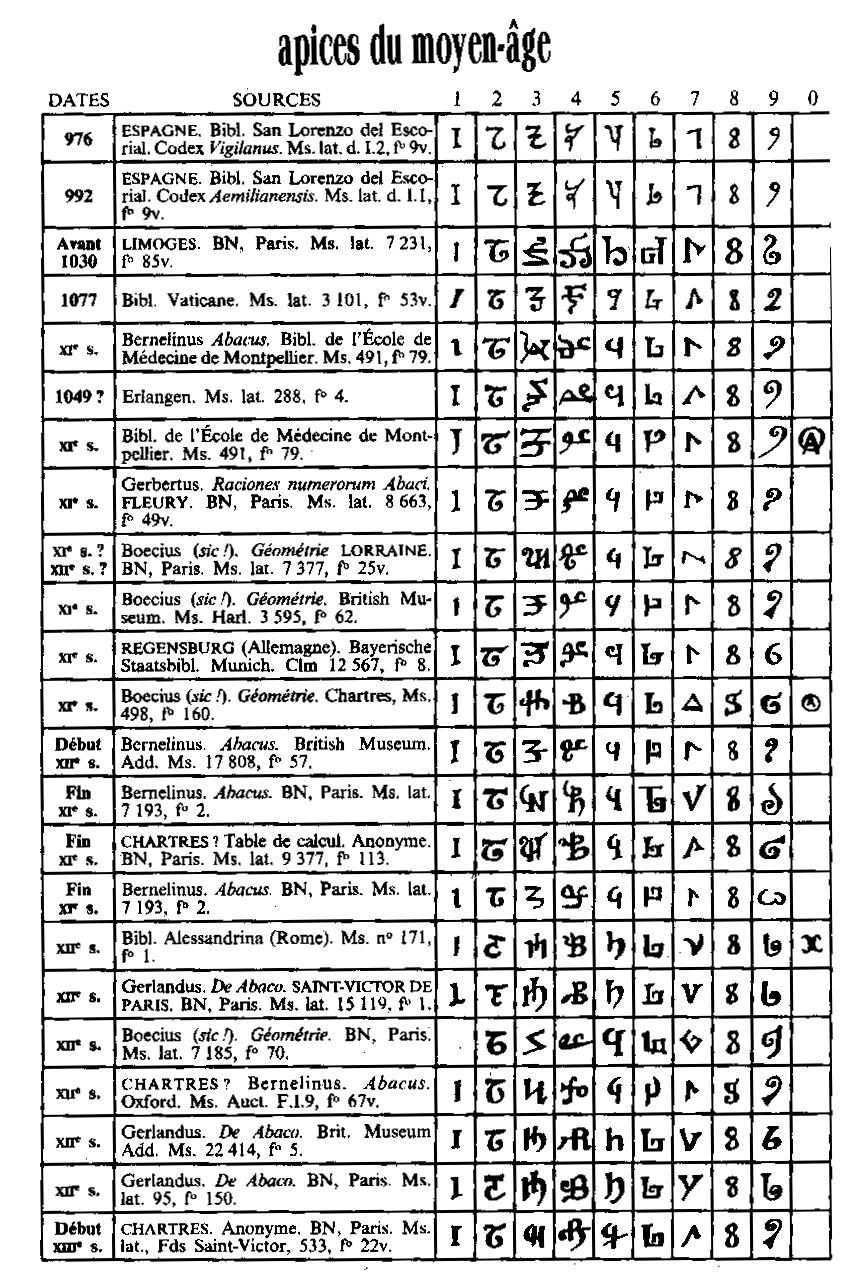
Table of apices

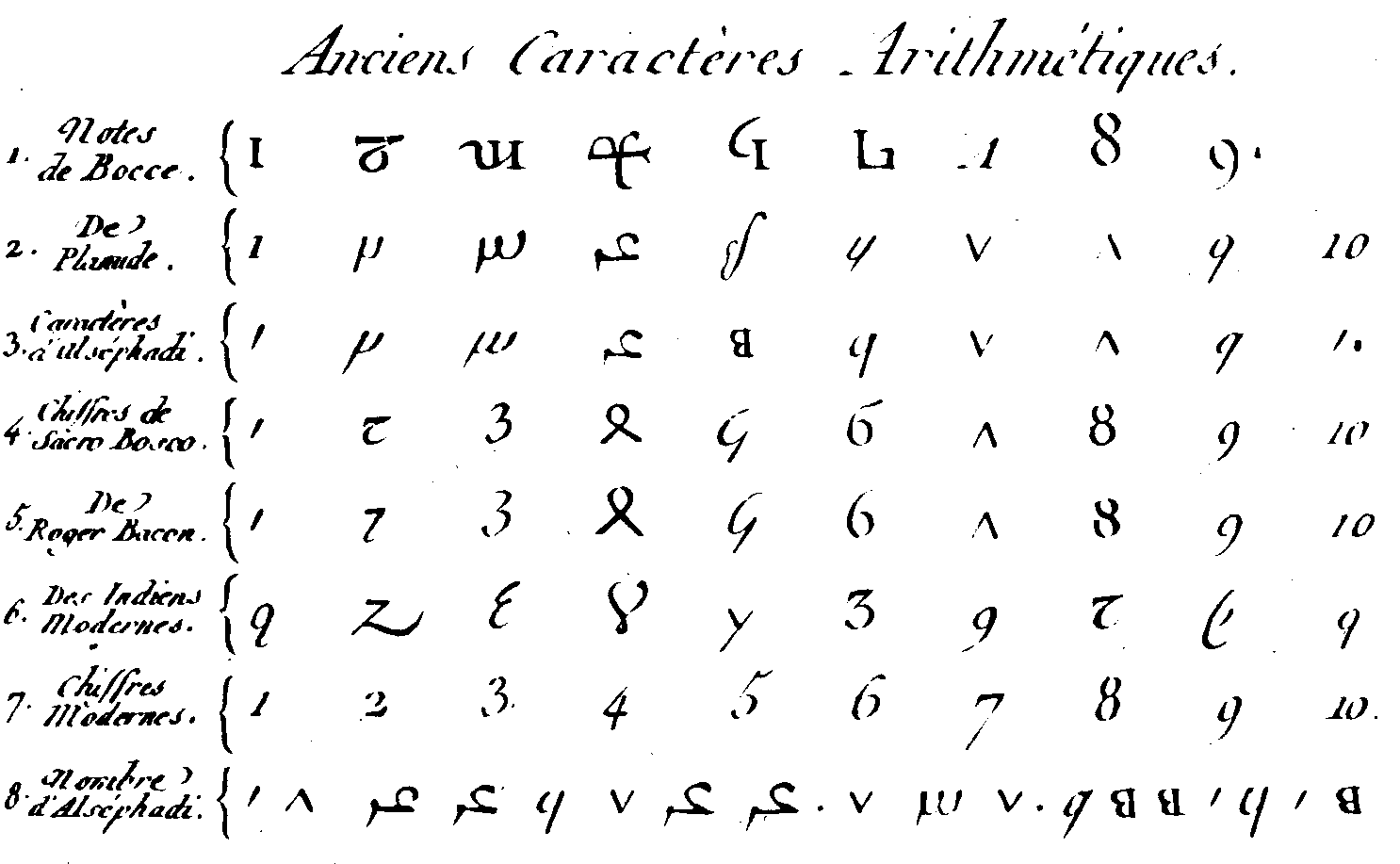
Table of numerals

== The abacus versus the Hindu–Arabic numeral system in early modern pictures ==
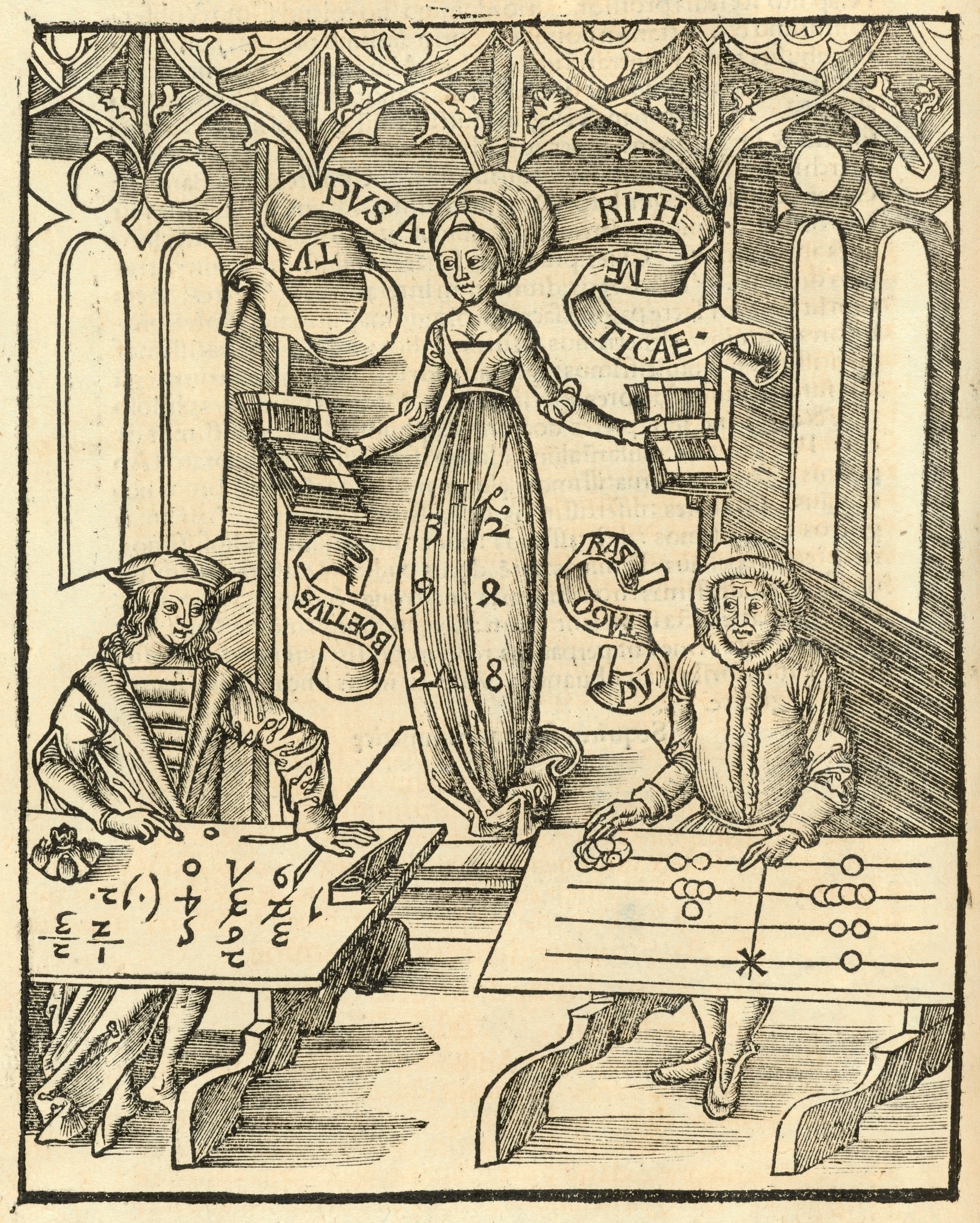

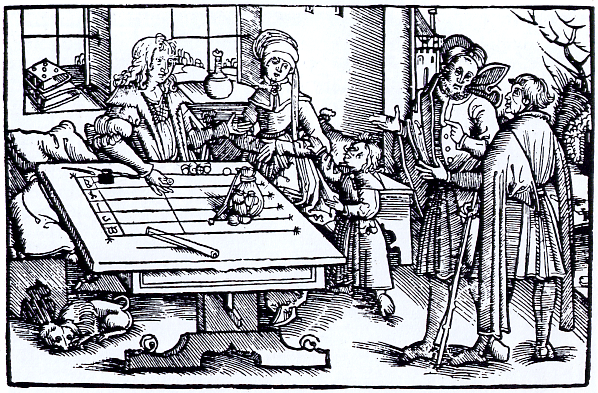

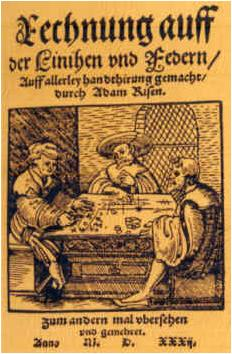

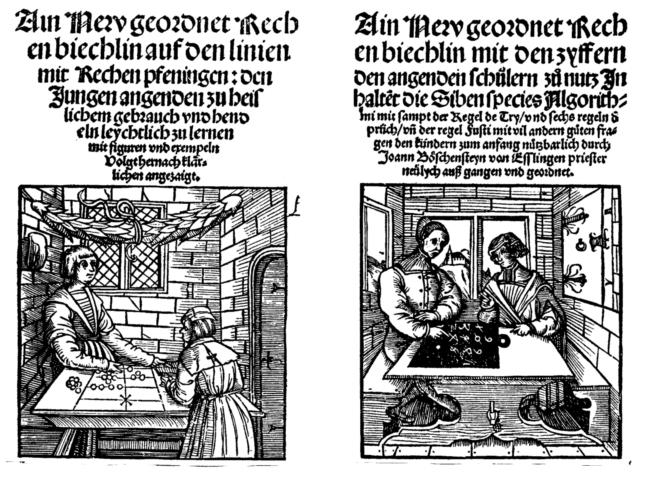

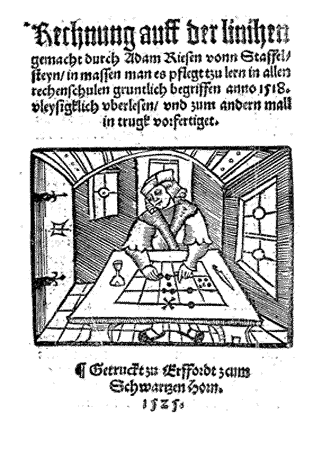

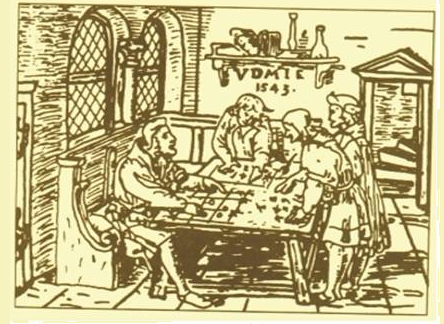

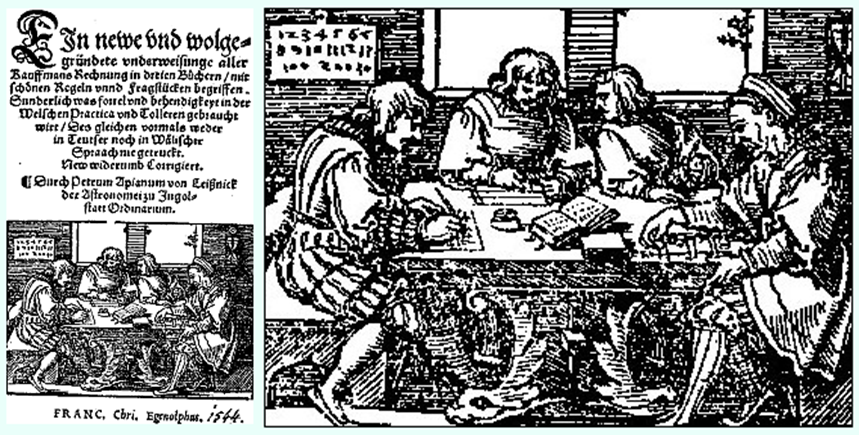

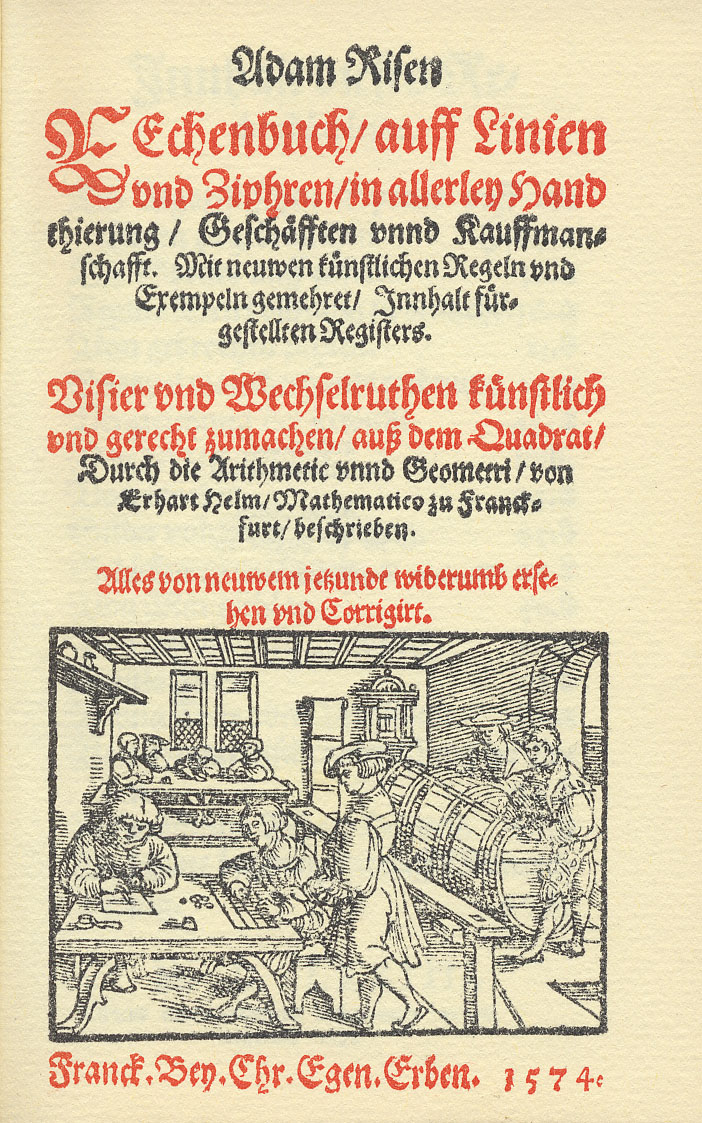

== Adoption in Europe ==
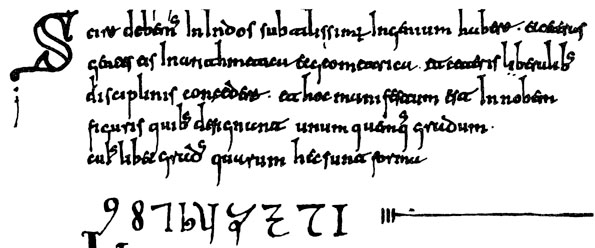
The first Arabic numerals in Europe appeared in the Codex Vigilanus in the year 976.

Medieval Arabic Numbers at World map from Ptolemy, Cosmographia. Ulm: Lienhart Holle, 1482

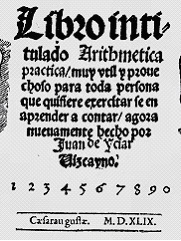
Libro Intitulado Arithmetica Practica, 1549

Adoption of Arabic numerals in Europe was slow, as a result of low literacy and numeracy levels. Mistrust of Islam also limited their spread, with the Catholic Church calling the numerals demonic. International trade and banking advancements accelerated the embracement of Arabic numerals during the thirteenth century.

- 976. The first Arabic numerals in Europe appeared in the Codex Vigilanus in the year 976.
- 1202. Fibonacci, an Italian mathematician who had studied in Béjaïa, Algeria, promoted the Arabic numeral system in Europe with his book Liber Abaci, which was published in 1202.
- 1447. In Vienna′s St. Stephen's Cathedral the center of the lower wing altar (predella) of the Wiener Neustädter Altar (see detailed view) depicts the year of its origin by hindu-arabic numerals similar to 𐩀४४𐨩 (in fact the ४ is rotated by 180° as shown on the 1482 world map) (see detailed view).
- 1482. The system did not come into wide use in Europe, however, until the invention of printing. (See, for example, the 1482 Ptolemaeus map of the world printed by Lienhart Holle in Ulm, and other examples in the Gutenberg Museum in Mainz, Germany.)
- 1497. The German artist Albrecht Dürer dated his engraving The Four Naked Women with hindu-arabic numerals, followed in his painting Self-Portrait (at the age of 28) in 1500.
- 1512. The numerals appear in their modern form on the title page of Conpusicion de la arte de la arismetica y juntamente de geometría by Juan de Ortega.
- 1549. The numerals appear in their modern form on the title page of Libro Intitulado Arithmetica Practica by Juan de Yciar, the Basque calligrapher and mathematician, published in Zaragoza.

In the last few centuries, the European variety of Arabic numbers spread around the world and became the most commonly used numeral system.

Even in many countries which have their own numeral systems, the European Arabic numerals are widely used in commerce and mathematics.

== Impact on arithmetic ==
The significance of the development of the positional number system is described by the French mathematician Pierre-Simon Laplace (1749–1827) who wrote:

It is India that gave us the ingenious method of expressing all numbers by the means of ten symbols, each symbol receiving a value of position, as well as an absolute value; a profound and important idea which appears so simple to us now that we ignore its true merit, but its very simplicity, the great ease which it has lent to all computations, puts our arithmetic in the first rank of useful inventions, and we shall appreciate the grandeur of this achievement when we remember that it escaped the genius of Archimedes and Apollonius, two of the greatest minds produced by antiquity.

== See also ==
- List of numeral system topics
- List of numeral systems
- Table of mathematical symbols by introduction date

== Notes ==
Sources

- Ifrah, Georges (1998) [first published in French in 1981], The Universal History of Numbers: From Prehistory to the Invention of the Computer, Harvill, ISBN 978-1-860-46324-2
- Menninger, Karl (2013) [first published by MIT Press in 1969], Number Words and Number Symbols: A Cultural History of Numbers, translated by Paul Broneer, Courier Corporation, ISBN 978-0-486-31977-3
- Plofker, Kim (2009), Mathematics in India, Princeton University Press, ISBN 978-0-691-12067-6
- Sarasvati, Svami Satya Prakash; Jyotishmati, Usha (1979), The Bakhshali Manuscript: An Ancient Treatise of Indian Arithmetic (PDF), Allahabad: Dr. Ratna Kumari Svadhyaya Sansthan, archived from the original (PDF) on 2014-06-20
- Smith, D. E.; Karpinski, L. C. (2013) [first published in Boston, 1911], The Hindu–Arabic Numerals, Dover, ISBN 978-0486155111
