= Rio Lobo =

1970 film by Howard Hawks

- Theatrical release poster
- Directed by: Howard Hawks
- Screenplay by: Burton Wohl; Leigh Brackett
- Story by: Burton Wohl
- Produced by: Howard Hawks
- Starring: John Wayne; Jorge Rivero; Jennifer O'Neill; Jack Elam; Victor French; Susana Dosamantes
- Cinematography: William H. Clothier
- Edited by: John Woodcock
- Music by: Jerry Goldsmith
- Production companies: Cinema Center Films; Malabar Productions
- Distributed by: National General Pictures
- Release date: December 17, 1970 (U.S.)
- Running time: 114 minutes
- Country: United States
- Language: English
- Budget: $6 million
- Box office: $4.25 million (North America rentals)

Rio Lobo is a 1970 American Western film directed and produced by Howard Hawks, his final directorial effort. It stars John Wayne in the lead role, along with Jorge Rivero, Jennifer O'Neill, Jack Elam, Victor French and Susana Dosamantes. The film's screenplay was written by Burton Wohl and Leigh Brackett, with a musical score composed by Jerry Goldsmith. It was shot in Cuernavaca in the Mexican state of Morelos and in Tucson, Arizona.

This was the third Howard Hawks film to explore the theme of a town sheriff defending his office against belligerent local outlaws; the others were Rio Bravo (1959) and El Dorado (1966), both also starring John Wayne.

Rio Lobo was released by National General Pictures on December 17, 1970. It was a critical and commercial disappointment upon initial release, though retrospective reviews have been more positive.

== Plot ==
During the American Civil War, a secret Union army payroll train is raided by Confederates, led by Captain Pierre Cordona and Sergeant Tuscarora Phillips. Union Colonel Cord McNally loses his close friend, Lieutenant Ned Forsythe, in the raid, and the complexity of the Confederates' scheme indicates that Union traitors must have provided them with the details about the transport. In the ensuing pursuit, McNally's squad is spread thinner and thinner, until he is left alone and captured by the Confederates. They demand that McNally lead them safely past Union camps since he knows the general location of the troops they want to avoid. McNally tricks them by leading them to a Union camp and raising the alarm; Cordona and Tuscarora are captured, but refuse to tell McNally who sold them their information.

Despite this development, the three men gain respect for each other. After the war ends, McNally visits Cordona and Tuscarora as they are being released. He asks them once more about the traitors. They are surprised that McNally does not resent them for the death of Lt Forsythe, but McNally explains that he respects the difference between an act of war and treason. All the former Confederates can provide is a physical description, though, but they agree to contact McNally if they see either of the two men again.

Sometime later, McNally is contacted by his friend Sheriff Pat Cronin of Blackthorne, Texas. Cronin tells McNally that Cordona is staying at the local hotel and wants to talk to him. When McNally arrives in Blackthorne, he meets a young woman, Shasta Delaney, who has come to report the murder of her employer by a deputy of Rio Lobo's sheriff, "Blue Tom" Hendricks. Shortly afterwards, a posse from Rio Lobo arrives and wants to take Delaney away. Delaney identifies their leader, "Whitey" Carter, as the murderer to whom she was referring. When one of the posse aims a gun at Cronin, Delaney shoots Whitey from under the table, resulting in a shoot-out in which McNally, Cronin, and Cordona finish off the posse.

Cordona identifies Whitey as one of the traitors for whom McNally was looking. He tells McNally that Tuscarora needs help; his father and other ranchers are having land stolen by a rich man named Ketcham, who had the previous sheriff killed and installed Hendricks in his place. McNally, Cordona, and Delaney go to Rio Lobo, where they find the people living in terror of Hendricks and his men. Tuscarora's girlfriend Maria hides them in her house, while her friend Amelita distracts Hendricks' men. Hendricks has Tuscarora arrested on trumped-up charges, so McNally's group goes to get help from Tuscarora's father, Old Man Philips.

McNally, Cordona, and Philips sneak into Ketcham's ranch, and McNally discovers that Ketcham is really Union Sergeant Major Ike Gorman, the second traitor for whom he was searching. McNally attacks Ketcham and forces him to sign the deeds back to their rightful owners. Taking Ketcham hostage, they send Cordona ahead to find the United States Cavalry. Upon arrival back to Rio Lobo, they discover that Hendricks has beaten Maria and disfigured Amelita with a knife for helping McNally. Amelita swears to McNally that she will kill Hendricks herself. McNally tells her not if he kills him first.

The men force Hendricks' party out of the jail and hole up there with Tuscarora to await the cavalry. Hendricks' men capture Cordona before he gets far and offer to trade him for Ketcham. During the prisoner exchange, Cordona manages to give his captors the slip. McNally tells Hendricks that Ketcham is no longer of any use to the sheriff, since he signed back the deeds. Angered, Hendricks guns down his own boss, starting a firefight in which McNally and he are wounded.

After a failed attempt to blow up the cantina that McNally's allies are using as a base, Hendricks' men are outflanked by the rest of the townspeople, who have rallied to help. As they flee, Hendricks tries to shoot them, but he has been using his rifle as a crutch, and with its muzzle clogged with dirt, it explodes in his face. As he stumbles to his horse, Amelita shoots him, thus fulfilling her promise to McNally.

== Cast ==
- John Wayne as Col. Cord McNally
- Jorge Rivero as Cpt. Pierre "Frenchy" Cordona
- Jennifer O'Neill as Shasta Delaney
- Christopher Mitchum as Sgt. Tuscarora Phillips
- Jack Elam as Phillips
- Victor French as Sgt. Maj. Ike Gorman / "Ketcham"
- Susana Dosamantes as María Carmen
- Sherry Lansing as Amelita
- David Huddleston as Dr. Ivor Jones
- Mike Henry as Sheriff "Blue" Tom Hendricks
- Bill Williams as Sheriff Pat Cronin
- Jim Davis as Deputy Riley
- Dean Smith as Bide
- Robert Donner as Deputy Whitey Carter
- George Plimpton as George
- Edward Faulkner as Lt. Harris
- Peter Jason as Lt. Ned Forsythe
- Chuck Courtney as Chuck
- Robert Rothwell as Jake

Uncredited

- Don "Red" Barry as Feeney
- Hank Worden as Hank
- Lance Hool as Pickett
- Gregg Palmer as Pete
- Sondra Currie as Prostitute in Blackthorne

== Production ==
=== Development and casting ===
Finance came from Cinema Center Films.

Hawks said he had to fight Cinema Center to cast Chris Mitchum (whose father was actor Robert Mitchum) in the movie. Hawks originally wanted to cast Robert Mitchum as Cardona, but his salary demands were too high. Rio Lobo was also the feature film debut of Peter Jason.

=== Filming ===
The film was meant to be shot in Durango, Mexico, on a budget of $5 million, but shooting on the movie Lawman took up facilities there, so Hawks and Cinema Center had to spend an extra $1 million to allow shooting in Cuernavaca and at Old Tucson Studios, near Tucson. The script was rewritten throughout production. The film was shot in Technicolor. Hawks was injured while filming the railway scene, requiring four stitches.

== Reception ==
=== Box office ===
The film made US$4.25 million in rentals, 20th among the highest money-making pictures of the year, but it grossed $2 million less than its $6 million budget, making it a box-office bomb.

=== Critical response ===
==== Initial reviews ====
Upon release, the film received mostly negative reviews. Variety wrote, "Hawks' direction is as listless as the plot". Roger Ebert, who gave the film 3 out of 4 stars, wrote, "Rio Lobo is just a shade tired, especially after the finely honed humor and action of El Dorado." Roger Greenspun of The New York Times said that the film was "close enough to greatness to stand above everything else so far in the current season." His comments surprised other critics and resulted in numerous angry letters sent to the newspaper.

==== Retrospective reviews ====
In retrospective, the film does have better reviews from contemporary critics. On Rotten Tomatoes, the film has a 70% rating, based in 23 reviews, with an average rating of 6.10/10. The consensus is that "Howard Hawks and John Wayne reunite to riff on their own Rio Bravo, and while the results are less memorable, the movie does offer a curiously cynical perspective." In a retrospective review, Jonathan Rosenbaum wrote, "The fact that its best action sequence, the first, was directed by the second unit is emblematic of Hawks's relative lack of engagement with the material." TV Guide wrote, "for such a refined director as Hawks to end his career on a note like this, having made some of the finest films in the history of American cinema, is an atrocity not worth the silver used in the negative." Writing for Time Out, Geoff Andrew said, "If it lacks the formal perfection of Rio Bravo and the moving elegy for men grown old of El Dorado, it's still a marvellous film". Empire writer Ian Nathan wrote in January 2000, "this well-bred Western is just a routine canter through themes and gunfights as worn as the saddles." Filmink called it "wheezy, sloppy but fun."

Quentin Tarantino cited Rio Lobo as one of the reasons he wanted to have a short directing career: "the most cutting-edge artist, the coolest guys, the hippest dudes, they're the ones that stay at the party too long. They're the ones that make those last two or three movies that are completely out of touch and do not realize the world has turned on them ... I don't want to make Rio Lobo."

== Soundtrack ==
Rio Lobo

Soundtrack album by Jerry Goldsmith
- Released: 2001
- Genre: Film music
- Label: Prometheus Records
- Producer: Jerry Goldsmith

The music for Rio Lobo was composed by Jerry Goldsmith. The soundtrack album was released in Belgium in 2001 on Prometheus Records.

All tracks are written by Jerry Goldsmith.

No.	Title	Length
1.	"Captured"	1:39
2.	"New Arrival / Unexpected Gun"	3:03
3.	"A Good Teacher / Quiet Town / Cantina"	9:42
4.	"Plans / The Raid"	7:01
5.	"Scar / Hang on a Minute / Finale"	5:37
6.	"Main Title"	2:16
7.	"A Good Teacher (Complete)"	6:00
8.	"No Place to Go"	1:14
9.	"Cordona's Capture"	0:42
10.	"The Trade / Retribution / End Title"	6:41

== See also ==
- List of American films of 1970
- John Wayne filmography
