= Benita Uribarrena Bollaín =

Basque resistance fighter

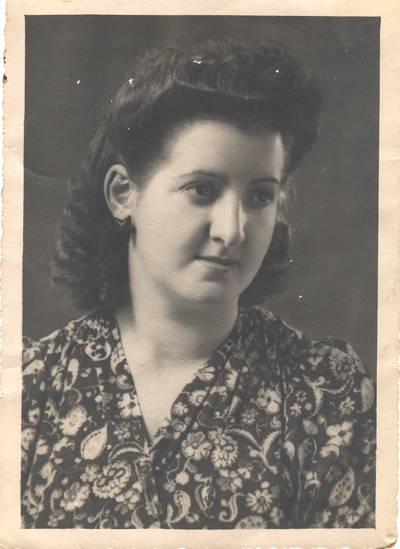
- Born: March 16, 1922; Durango, Spain
- Died: October 12, 2011 (aged 89); Le Soler, France
- Political party: Communist Party of Spain
- Parents: Santiago Uribarrena Munitxa (father); Benita Bollaín Bilbao (mother)

Benita Uribarrena Bollaín (Durango, 16 March 1922 – Le Soler, 12 October 2011) was a member of the Communist Party of Spain and the Antifascist Women Union. She took part in the French Resistance during the Second World War.

== Early life and Civil War ==
Her mother, Benita Bollaín Bilbao, was a communist and owned a press kiosk in the Ezkurdi place in Durango, Spain, which earned her the nickname of "Benita the Journalist". She was the first to announce the near proclamation of the II Republic in the town and was detained in a kennel for it.

Her father, Santiago Uribarrena Munitxa, a socialist activist, was a railway worker. After the strikes of October 1934, the Civil Guard arrested him and forced him to get into a river to turn in weapons, getting sick and dying a few days later. His funeral was celebrated on 30 December 1934, which was the first civil funeral in Durango.

Benita was the youngest of four siblings. After the bombing of Durango on 31 March 1937, she was evacuated together with one of her sisters and her mother. They arrived in France in June 1937 with the Habana ship.

== Exile ==
In France, she worked at a hotel and started her political activity in the Communist Party of Spain (PCE). She participated as a clandestine courier and guided people who fled Spain through the Pyrénées-Orientales border.

In 1944, she joined the French Resistance. She was arrested and imprisoned for one month until the liberation of France.

Uribarrena lived most of her life in Le Soler. Among other jobs, she was employed by Pau Casals, Catalan republican also living in exile.

== Recognition ==
In 2000, she was decorated as a member of the resistance.

On 6 October 2017, the City of Durango inaugurated a public park in her name.
