= Vijayasena =

- Western Satrap king
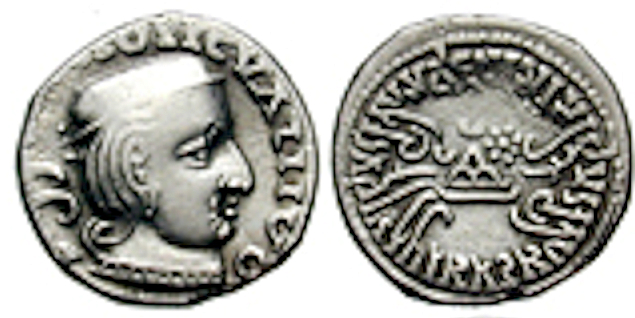
- Drachme of Vijayasena
- Reign: 238-250 CE
- Predecessor: Yasodaman I
- Successor: Isvaradatta, Damajadasri III
- Father: Damasena

Vijayasena (Brahmi 𑀯𑀺𑀚𑀬𑀲𑁂𑀦 reigned 238-250) was a Saka ruler of the Western Satraps in India during the 2nd century CE. He was one of 4 sons of Damasena that ascended to the throne. In 242 CE, he was usurped by Isvaradatta, and regained the throne about a year and a half later. He was succeeded by his brother, Damajadasri III.

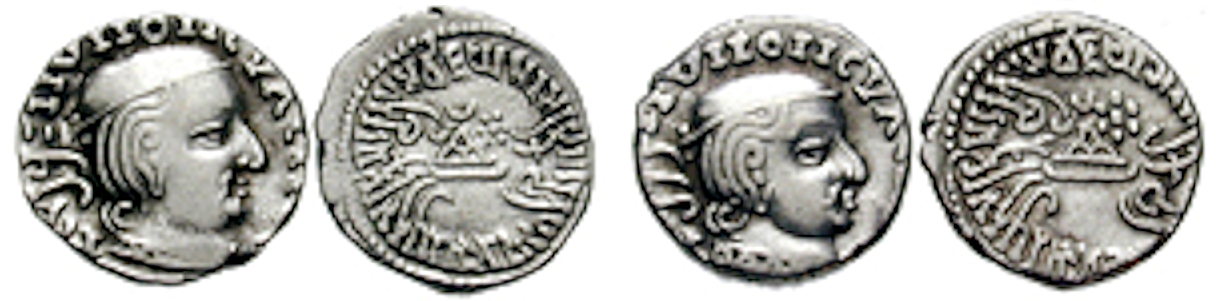
Variations of the coinage of Vijayasena. The name Vijayasena (Brahmi) appears at the top of the reverse.

Preceded by Yasodaman I	Western Satrap; 238–250	Succeeded by Damajadasri III
