= Damajadasri III =

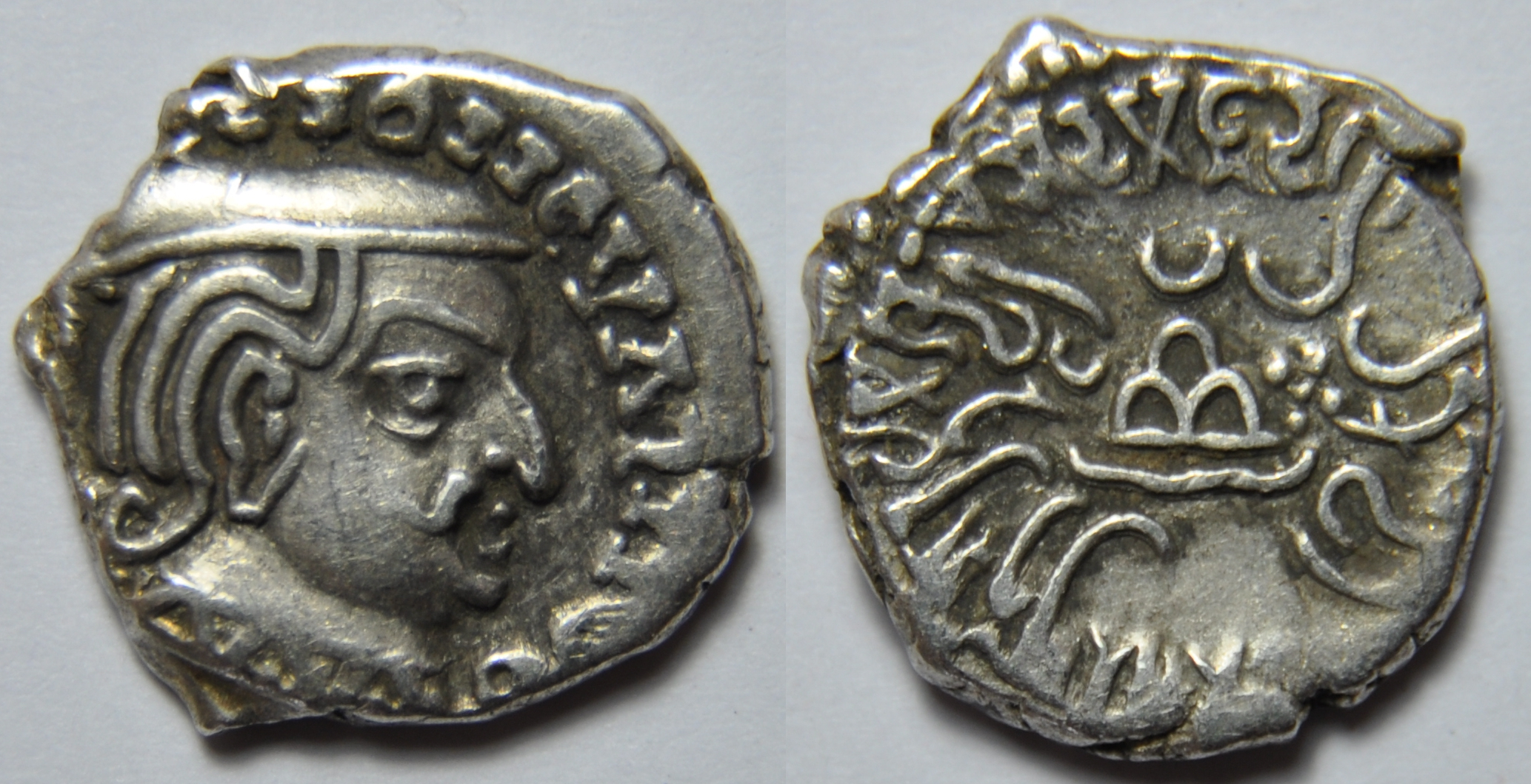
- Damajadasri III as portrayed in his coin. His name appears at the top of the reverse
- Reign: 251–256
- Predecessor: Vijayasena
- Successor: Rudrasena II
- Issue: Bhartrdaman
- House: Karadamka
- Father: Damasena

Damajadasri III (Brahmi) was a ruler of the Western Satraps. His reign lasted possibly from c. 251 AD to 256 AD.

== Biography ==
Damajadasri was one of the four sons of Damasena. Damajadasri was the youngest of his siblings. He succeeded his elder brother Vijayasena as a ruler.

He most likely held the title of mahaksatrapa. There is no evidence that he would have held the office of ksatrapa.

Large amounts of coins struck in name of Damajadasri have been found.

Damajadasri was succeeded as Western Satrap by his nephew Rudrasena II who was a son of Viradaman.

| Preceded by Vijayasena | Western Satrap; 251–256 | Succeeded by Rudrasena II |
