= Durango (disambiguation) =

Durango is a state in Mexico.

Durango may also refer to:

== Arts, media, and entertainment ==
- Durango (film), a 1999 drama film
- "Durango" (instrumental), by JJ Cale
- The Durango Kid (film), a 1940 western film

== Electronics ==
- Durango Systems Corporation, a US computer company in the 1970s
- Team Durango, a British radio control car brand
- Durango, the development code name of Microsoft's Xbox One game console

== Places ==
- Durango (city) (Victoria de Durango), capital of the Mexican state of Durango
- Durango, Spain
- Durango, Colorado, United States
- Durango, Iowa, United States
- Durango, Texas, United States

== Schools ==
- Durango High School (Colorado), United States
- Durango High School (Nevada), United States

== Sports ==
- Durango (racing team), an Italian auto racing team
- Alacranes de Durango, a Mexican football club

== Transportation ==
=== Vehicles ===
- Dodge Durango, an American mid-size SUV
- Ford Durango, an American coupe utility
- Durango 95, pseudonym of the Probe 16 car featured in the film A Clockwork Orange
- Durango-class patrol vessel, operated by the Mexican Navy
- ARM Durango, two vessels of the Mexican Navy

=== Roads and routes ===
- Durango Drive, a major north–south road in the Las Vegas Valley, Nevada, United States

=== Stations ===
- Durango (Mexico City Metrobús), a BRT station in Mexico City

== Other uses ==
- Durango root (Datisca glomerata), a herb
- Durango (hotel and casino), a casino in Las Vegas, Nevada, United States

== See also ==
- Durango Airport (disambiguation)
- Duranga, a 2022 crime thriller
