= Durango, Mexico =

Durango, Mexico, may refer to:

- Durango, a state of Mexico
- Durango (city), the capital city of Durango

== See also ==
- Durango (disambiguation)
