= Kurutzesantu Museum =

Museum located in Durango, Biscay, Spain

- Museo Kurutzesantu
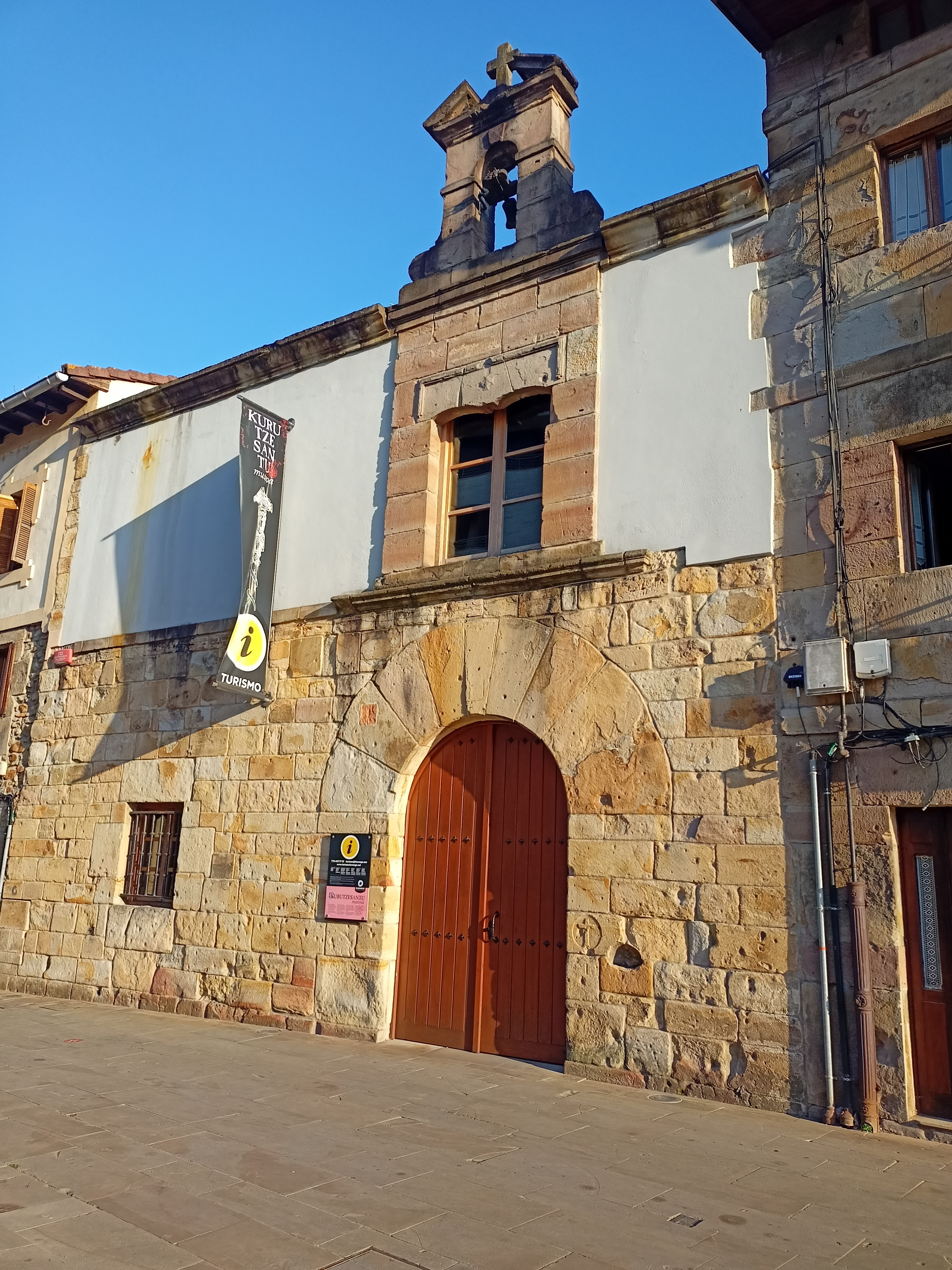
- The museum

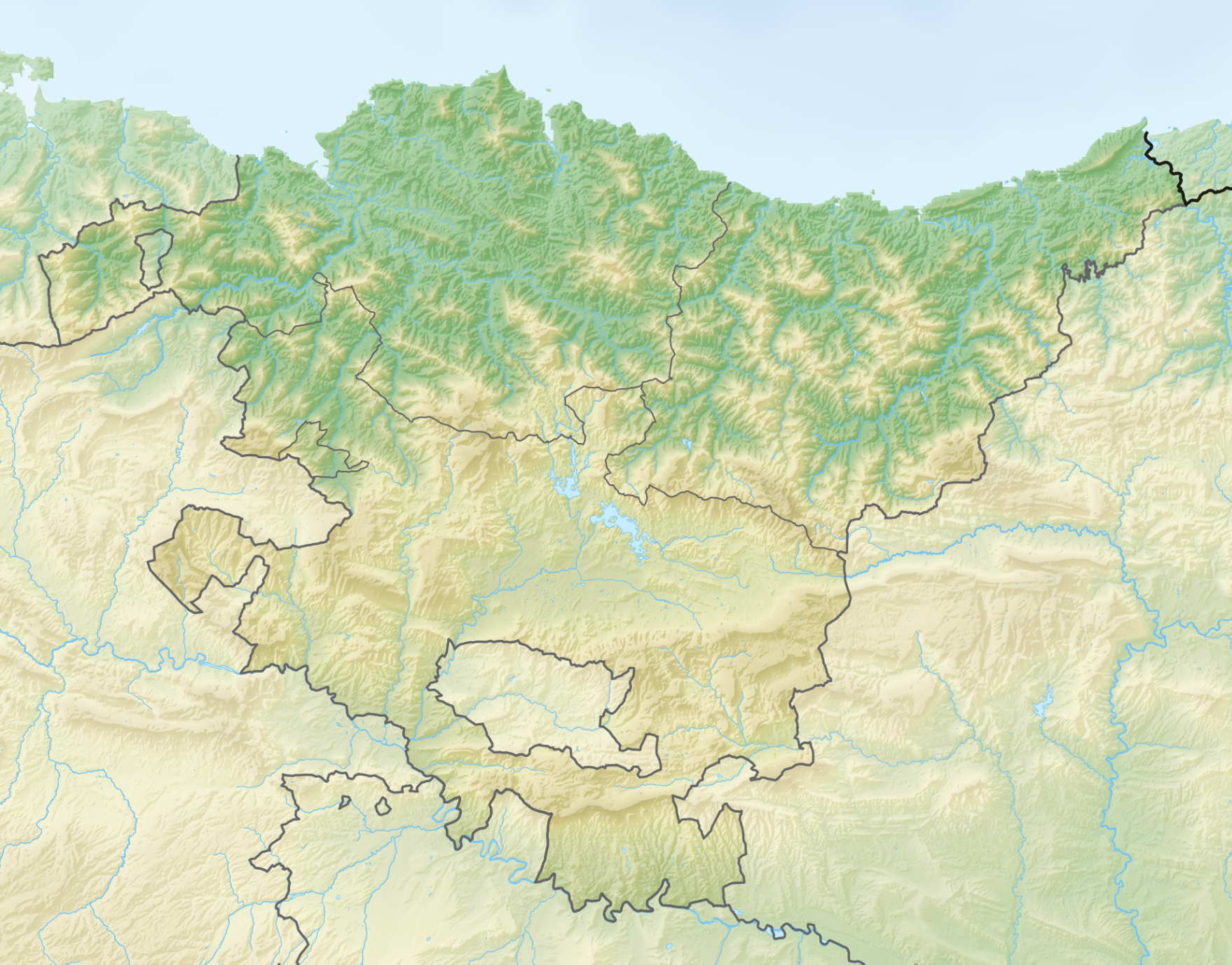
- Location within the Basque Country
- Location: Durango, Biscay, Spain
- Coordinates: 43°10′05″N 2°37′40″W
- Type: Religious museum
- Key holdings: Kurutziaga Cross (15th–16th century Gothic cross)
- Collections: Gothic sculpture
- Collection size: 1 principal artifact (the Kurutziaga Cross)
- Owner: Local municipal authority
- Website: Tourist Information Office of Durango – Kurutzesantu Museum

The Kurutzesantu Museum is a museum located in Durango, Biscay, Spain, created to house the Kurutziaga Cross, a sculpted Gothic cross believed to date from the 15th–16th centuries AD. The cross has been designated a Historic Artistic Monument.

== Kurutziaga Cross ==
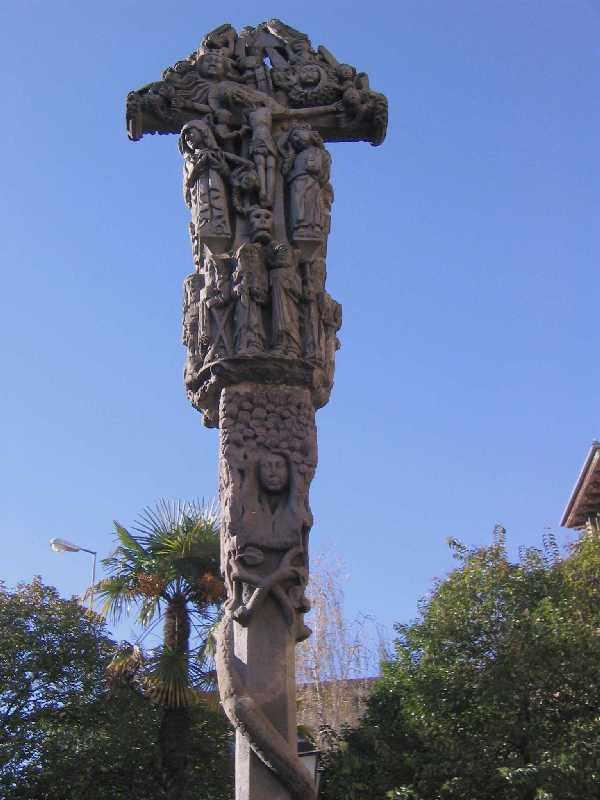
The top of the cross in 2005

The Kurutziaga Cross, made of dark sandstone, is 4.3 metres (14 ft) high and fully adorned with relief carvings. The lower part of the upright, representing sin and retribution, features the serpent of Eden with a woman's head; above it are scenes of Adam and Eve and the fall of man. The next section depicts the Twelve Apostles. The top portion represents the Redemption, with one side depicting the Madonna and child in Paradise and the other depicting the Crucifixion of Jesus.

The cross's original function and meaning are uncertain. The most prevalent theory is that it was created in atonement for a 15th-century episode of heresy in Durango, inspired by the unorthodox preaching of the Franciscan Alonso de Mella—many of his followers having been burned to death on the site where the cross would be set up, near the Jesuit chapel of Vera Cruz. Others, however, favor a connection with a religious brotherhood of Vera Cruz that met in the chapel. Still others believe that the cross may have been erected to mark the boundary of the town.
