= Durango, Spain =

Durango
- Municipality
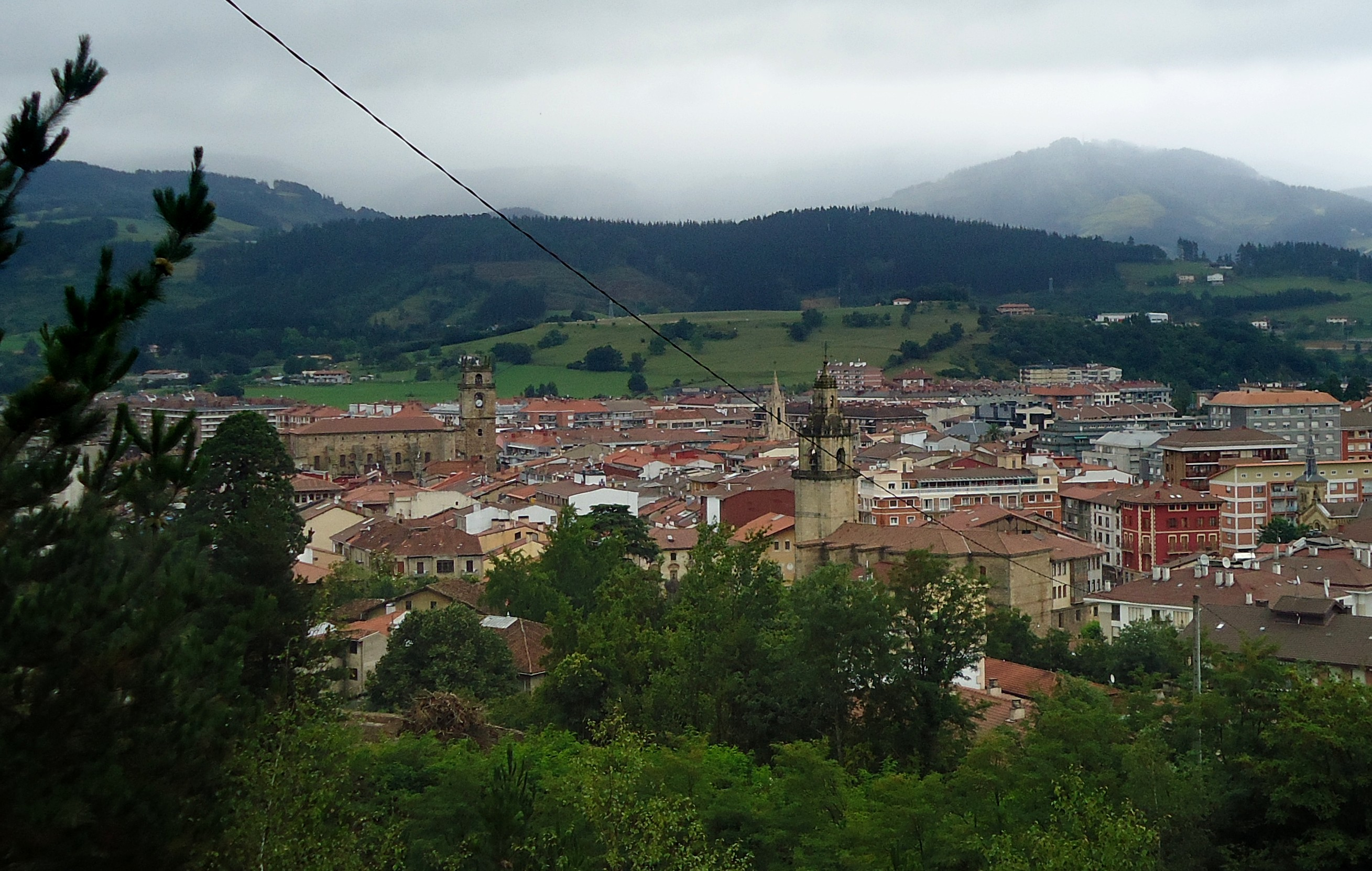
- Partial view of Durango

- Coat of arms

- Location of Durango within the Basque Country
- Coordinates: 43°10′8″N 2°37′48″W
- Country: Spain
- Autonomous community: Basque Country
- Province: Biscay
- Comarca: Durangaldea
- Founded: In the early 13th century

Government
  - Mayor: Ima Garrastatxu Urbaneja (EH Bildu)

Area
  - Total: 10.79 km^{2} (4.17 sq mi)
- Elevation: 119 m (390 ft)

Population (2025-01-01)
  - Total: 30,192
  - Density: 2,798/km^{2} (7,247/sq mi)
- Demonym: Durangar
- Time zone: UTC+1 (CET)
  - Summer (DST): UTC+2 (CEST)
- Postal code: 48200
- Website: Official website

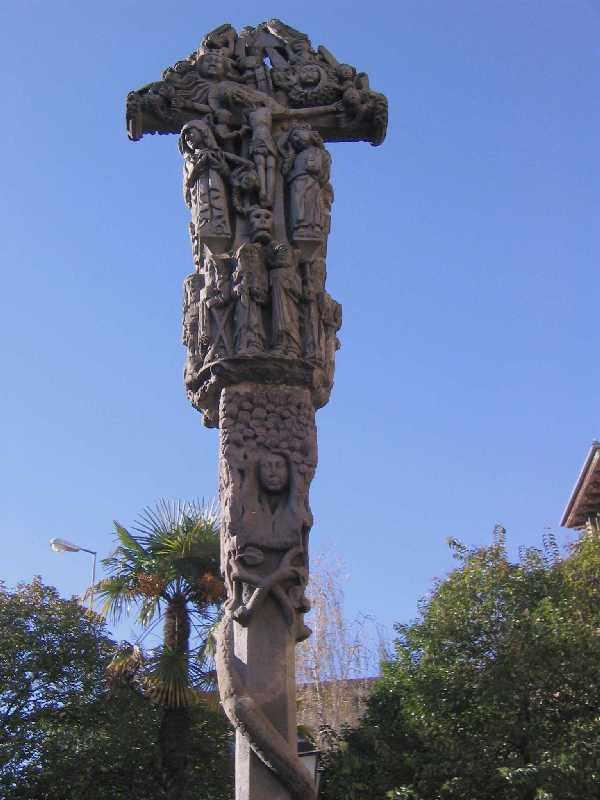
Kurutziaga Cross.

Durango is a town and municipality of the historical territory and province of Biscay, located in the Basque Country, Spain. It is the main town of Durangaldea, one of the comarcas of Biscay. Because of its economical activities and population, Durango is considered one of the largest towns in Biscay after the ones that compose the conurbation of Greater Bilbao.

Durango has 29,715 inhabitants (2023). The town is crossed by three rivers (as illustrated in the town symbol). The Ibaizabal river is the main river, and lies in the middle of its wide valley, with the Urkiola mountain range and natural park to the south. The tallest peak is Anboto (1,331 m (4,367 ft) in elevation).

== Etymology ==
There are many differing opinions about the origin of the name Durango. Basque linguist Alfonso Irigoyen has suggested its origin to be in the name Duranco, probably used in the early Middle Ages. Other authors suggest the name to be a derivation of Urazango or an evolved form of Padurango. The Royal Basque Academy of the Language postulates that the name Durango stems from the Latin name Turanicus, possibly a Roman fundus like many others in the Basque Country (cf. Kuartango). In the confirmation of the town's fuero it is referred to as Tavira de Durango; Tavira was probably the primitive name of the settlement and Durango the name of the region surrounding it. Until the 16th century, the town was known as Uribarri de Durango, Uribarri being Basque for "New town".

== History ==
While it is not known exactly when Durango was founded, it was subject to the Kingdom of Navarre, and is attested on an 1179 document revolving around territorial litigation between Alfonso VIII of Castile and Sancho VI of Navarre, The Wise (1150–1194). The impending threat of a military intervention conducted by King Alfonso VIII against the Navarrese led King Sancho VI to found other fortified towns, such as San Sebastián and Vitoria-Gasteiz (1181). Between 1199 and 1201, King Alfonso VIII of Castile finally occupied the lordship of Durango and its hinterland, as well as other key western Basque districts (Álava, Gipuzkoa). Durango went on to form part of the Crown of Castile, but former laws and institutions were upheld by the Castilian king.

In the 15th century, Durango got engaged in the wider War of the Bands, with various conflicts involving the Ibarguen, Zaldibar and Unzueta families. During this period, tower houses belonging to different clans were erected, such as the ones of Arandoño, Asteiza, Etxebarria, Lariz, Monago, and Otalora. Henry III (1393) and Henry IV (1457), the Castilian Kings, were both received in Durango, as well as Queen Isabel of Castile ["The Catholic"] (1483), who enticed Durango and the Lordship of Biscay to her cause in exchange for ratifying their laws and institutions, i.e. she swore the fueros, and favourable trade conditions. According to the municipal records, both monarchs took shelter in the Lariz Tower.

In 1517 Durango was devastated by a terrible epidemic of plague that caused many deaths amongst the inhabitants. Some years after the epidemic, in 1544, heavy flooding inundated a good part of the town. Just the opposite, in 1554 the town was ravaged by fire, burning all wooden buildings to the ground, i.e. virtually all the buildings were burnt down. In 1597 another plague epidemic spread across the town. The Town Hall is recorded to have been built in the 16th century.

The name Durango was used by conquistadores like Francisco de Ibarra to found more Durangos in America named after the Basque original one, e.g. a state in Mexico called Durango, whose principal city is called Durango.

During the 17th century, the town of Durango had to face up to the enormous human and economic cost incurred on the various wars the Crown of Castile embarked upon against France. Following heavy human losses suffered in battles and an episode of cholera epidemic, the town ended up virtually ruined.

At the end of the 19th century, exactly in 1882, the railway line from Bilbao to Durango was inaugurated. While the construction was expensive, during the early 20th century Durango flourished.

=== Spanish Civil War ===
The Nationalists started an offensive against Republican held Biscay and 31 March 1937 saw the Bombing of Durango by the Aviazione Legionaria and the Condor Legion. Durango was a town of 10,000 inhabitants and a key road and railway junction behind the frontline. More than 500 people were killed in the bombing and the following days. On 28 April 1937 Durango fell to the Nationalists without much resistance.

== Main sights ==
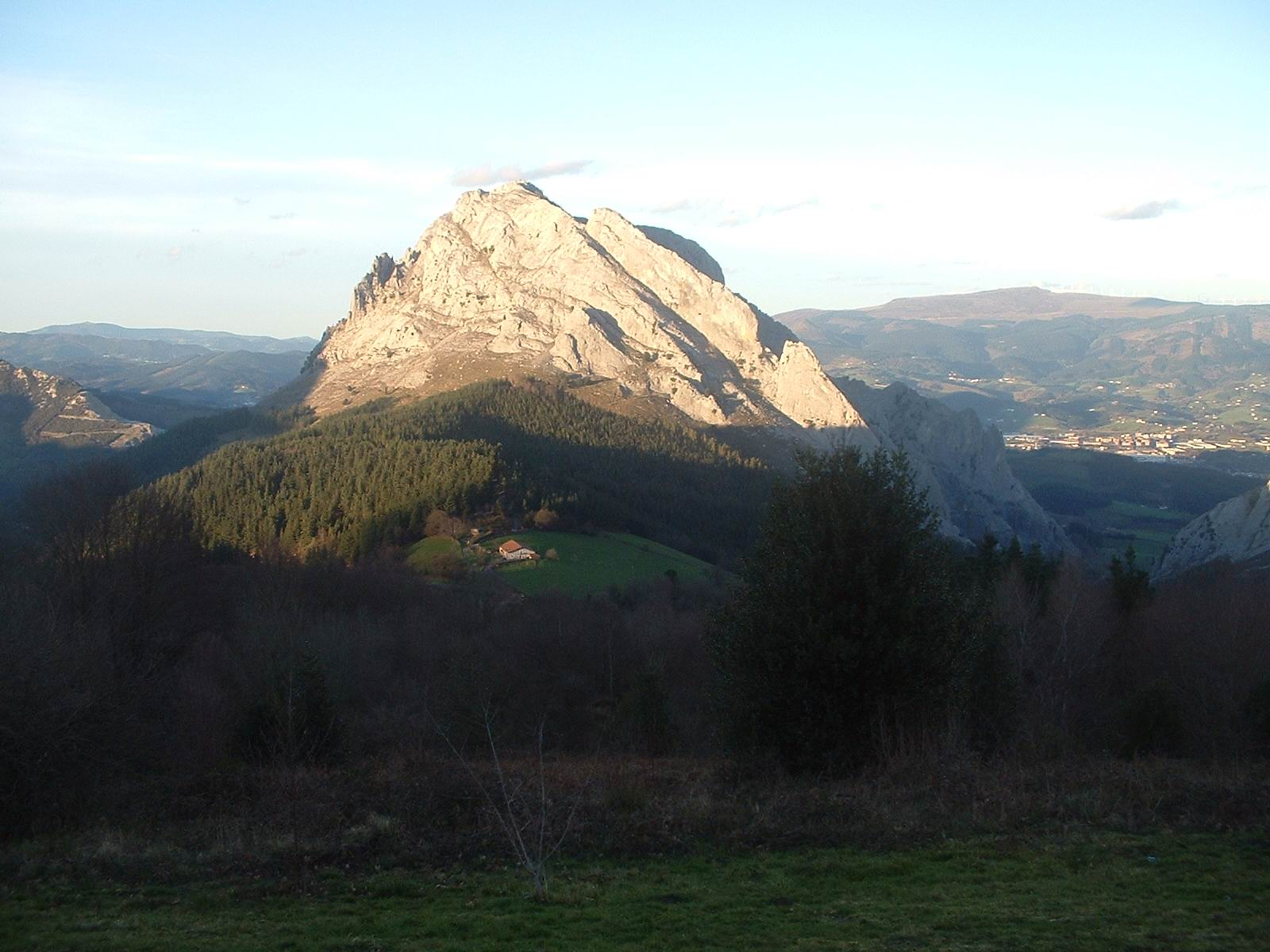
The limestone summits of Urkiola; Durango is seen in the background.

- The Kurutziaga Cross (housed in the Kurutzesantu Museum). It was built between the late 15th and early 16th century. It tells a story and it has a gothic style with a clear Flemish, German influence.
- Baroque Santa Ana's Arch, designed by local architect Juan de Herdoiza (18th century) for the now disappeared line of walls. The arch was constructed to symbolise the town gates, through which the King was required to pass when he visited.
- Mikeldi idol, of pre-Roman times, representing a quadrupedal animal.
- Lariz Tower is an urban palace which was built around the end of the 15th century. It was renovated in 2009 and currently, it is the Tourist Information Office of the town. It is believed that the Queen Isabella Catholic stayed overnight when she visited Durango in order to swear the regional laws (fueros) and those of the Merindad de Durango. In the building there are decorative elements of the final Gothic such as large windows of seat or heights of taste Hispanic-Fleming and others of the Renaissance (Rounded arches…)

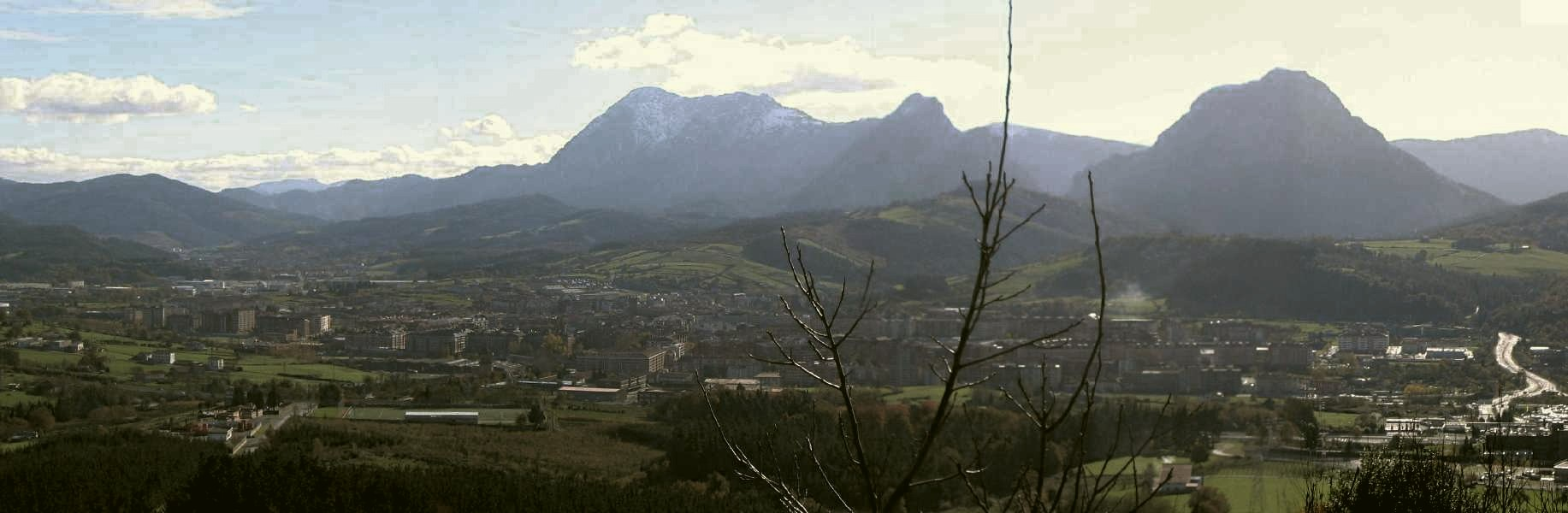
Panorama of Durango

== Economy ==
Durango's economy is mainly focused on the secondary sector, with a longstanding specialization on the manufacturing of machine tools and metallurgy. Tertiary services such as healthcare, education and research and development are also established in the area with an increasing growth.

Durango was for many years the home of Euskal Telebista. This public television company broadcasts in Basque and Spanish. It also has a global presence with satellite channel beamed across the world. ETB has moved to a new headquarters in Bilbao.

== Language ==
In Durango, besides Spanish, the Biscayan variety (bizkaiera) of Basque is spoken, with the characteristics of the region.

== Politics and administration ==
Municipal Elections 2011:

The Plenary Council of Durango (2011–2015)
Political Party	Votes	%	City councillors	Representative
PNV	4.649	33,91%	8	Aitziber Irigoras
Bildu	3.650	26,63%	6	Urdaspal Bolinaga
PSE-EE (PSOE)	1.801	13,14%	3	Pilar Ríos
PP	1.501	10,95%	2	Juan Jose Gastañazatorre
Aralar	1.373	10,02%	2	Daniel Maeztu
EB-B	465	3,39%	0	

- Elected mayor: Aitziber Irigoras Alberdi (EAJ-PNV).

Municipal Elections 2015:

The Plenary Council of Durango (2015–2019)
Political Party	Votes	%	City councillors	Representative
PNV	5.089	36,98%	8	Aitziber Irigoras
EH Bildu	4.306	31,29%	7	Dani Maeztu
Herriaren Eskubidea	1.842	13,39%	3	Julián Rios
PSE-EE (PSOE)	1312	9,53%	2	Pilar Ríos
PP	960	6,98%	1	Fran Garate

- Elected mayor: Aitziber Irigoras Alberdi (EAJ-PNV).

Municipal Elections 2019:

The Plenary Council of Durango (2019–2023)
Political Party	Votes	%	City councillors	Representative
PNV	5.426	35,27%	8	Mireia Elkoroiribe
EH Bildu	4.970	32,30%	7	Ima Garrastatxu
Herriaren Eskubidea	2.515	16,35%	4	Juan Julián Ríos
PSE-EE (PSOE)	1.541	10,02%	2	Jesica Ruiz
PP	697	4,53%	0	Aiala Eguíluz
Vox	111	0,72%	0	Luis Fernando Mancebo

- Elected mayor: Ima Garrastatxu Urbaneja (EH Bildu).

== Transportation ==
=== Bus ===
Every half an hour there is a BizkaiBus bus service to Bilbao. There are two routes, one via the AP-8 motorway which takes about 30 minutes. This bus runs on the hour. The other slower crosscountry route stops in all towns and takes about 50 mins. There is also a once an hour bus to Eibar, a neighbouring town of a similar size to Durango.

Buses also run to a variety of coastal villages, such as Ondarroa and Lekeitio (from Iurreta, a neighbouring village part of the Durango conurbation). There are direct buses to Vitoria-Gasteiz and San Sebastián.

=== Train ===
Trains (from EuskoTren company) are narrow gauge and run on a single track. Durango was cut in two by the railway and seven level crossings caused traffic delays.

7 years after construction began, Bilbao–San Sebastián EuskoTren services started using the new 4 km tunnel beneath the town of Durango on December 17. The €232m project was funded by the Basque government and included the construction of an underground station in the town centre. It allowed for the closure of the original line, which cut through the centre of the town.

The tunnel opened in 2012, 130 years to the day after the first train from Bilbao arrived in Durango, and is a key part of the upgrading of the Bilbao–San Sebastián line, which includes 15 km of track-doubling, elimination of 27 level crossings, and construction of new stations at Euba, Durango and Traña.

Trains run to Bilbao-Atxuri station and San Sebastián and it is possible to get to Guernica and Bermeo also with a train change at Amorebieta.

== Sister cities ==
Durango has two sister cities.:

- - Durango, Durango, Mexico
- - Durango, Colorado, United States

== Notable people ==
- Juan de Yciar, calligraphist and mathematician
- Martín Ruiz de Gamboa, Royal Governor of Chile
- José María Ampuero Jáuregui, Carlist politician
- Benita Uribarrena Bollaín, member of the French Resistance
