= Shaka era =

Hindu calendar era

Today (at UTC+00)
- Monday, 19 October 2026
- Hindu: Uttarāṣāḍha・Dhṛti; Solar: 2 Kārtika, 1948 SE; Lunisolar: Adhika Aṣṭamī, Śukla pakṣa of Āśvina, 2083 VE; Rāudra・5127 KY・1,872,867
Other calendars
Akan	Monodwo
Armenian	1 Trē 1476
Aztec	Izcalli 17, 10 Itzcuintli
Babylonian	6 Tashritu, 2337 SE
Balinese pawukon	Menga, Kajeng, Menala, Wage, Maulu, Coma of Dukut, Yama, Erangan, Dewa
Bengali	3 Kartik, BS 1433
Chinese	Yang Fire Tiger・Heart Mansion; Fire Horse Year, Month 9, Day 10 (Hanlu, 4 days until Shuangjiang)
Common Era	19 October 2026 CE
Coptic	9 Paopi, AM 1743
Egyptian	6 Phamenoth, 2775 NE
Ethiopian	9 Ṭeqemt, 2019 Amätä Məhrät
French Republican	Décade III, Septidi de Vendémiaire de l'Année 235 de la République
Gregorian	19 October, AD 2026
Hebrew	8 Cheshvan, AM 5787
Icelandic	Mánudagur, 26 Haustmánuður 2026
Islamic	7 Jumada al-awwal, AH 1448 (using tabular method)
ISO week date	2026-W43-1
Japanese	9 Nagatsuki, Reiwa 8 (Kanro, 4 days until Sōkō)
Julian	6 October, AD 2026 (AM 7535)
Julian day	2461333
Korean	9 Gaedal, 4359 DE
Maya	13.0.14.0.10; 3 Zac, 10 Oc
Roman	Pridie Nonas Octobres, MMDCCLXXIX AUC
Solar Hijri	27 Mehr, SH 1405
Tibetan	9 tha skar, me pho rta 2153 or 1772 or 1000

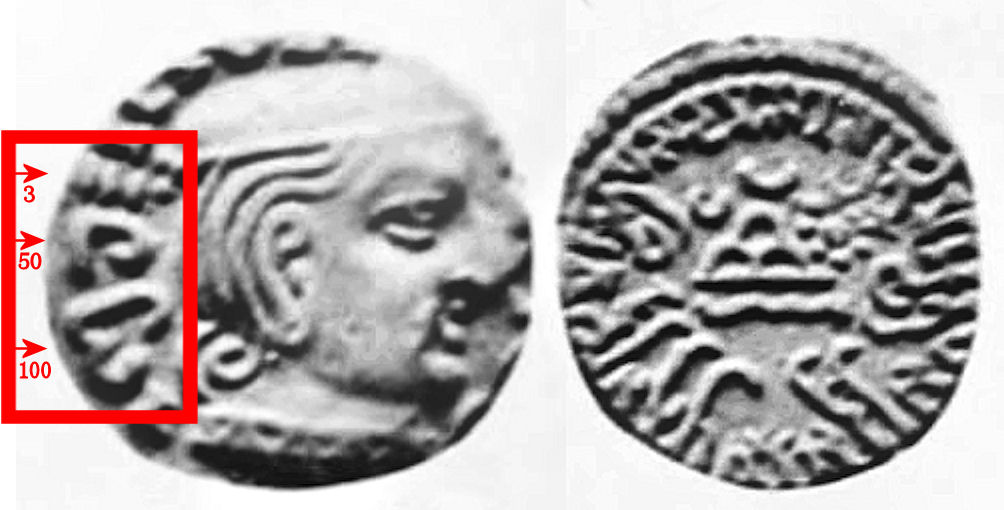
Coin of Western Satrap ruler Damasena. The minting date, here 153 (100-50-3 in Brahmi script numerals) of the Saka era, therefore 231 CE, clearly appears behind the head of the king.

The Shaka era (IAST: Śaka, Śāka) also known as Shali Vahana (S.V) is a historical Hindu calendar era. It is referred as the Shalivahana Era or Śālivāhana. The Shaka era uses expired, elapsed, or complete years, where a year must have elapsed before it can be counted. This is similar to the Western method of determining a person's age, whose first year must have been completed before that person reaches one year old. The epoch (its year zero) of which corresponds to 78 CE. The era has been widely used in different regions of the Indian subcontinent as well as in Southeast Asia.

== History ==
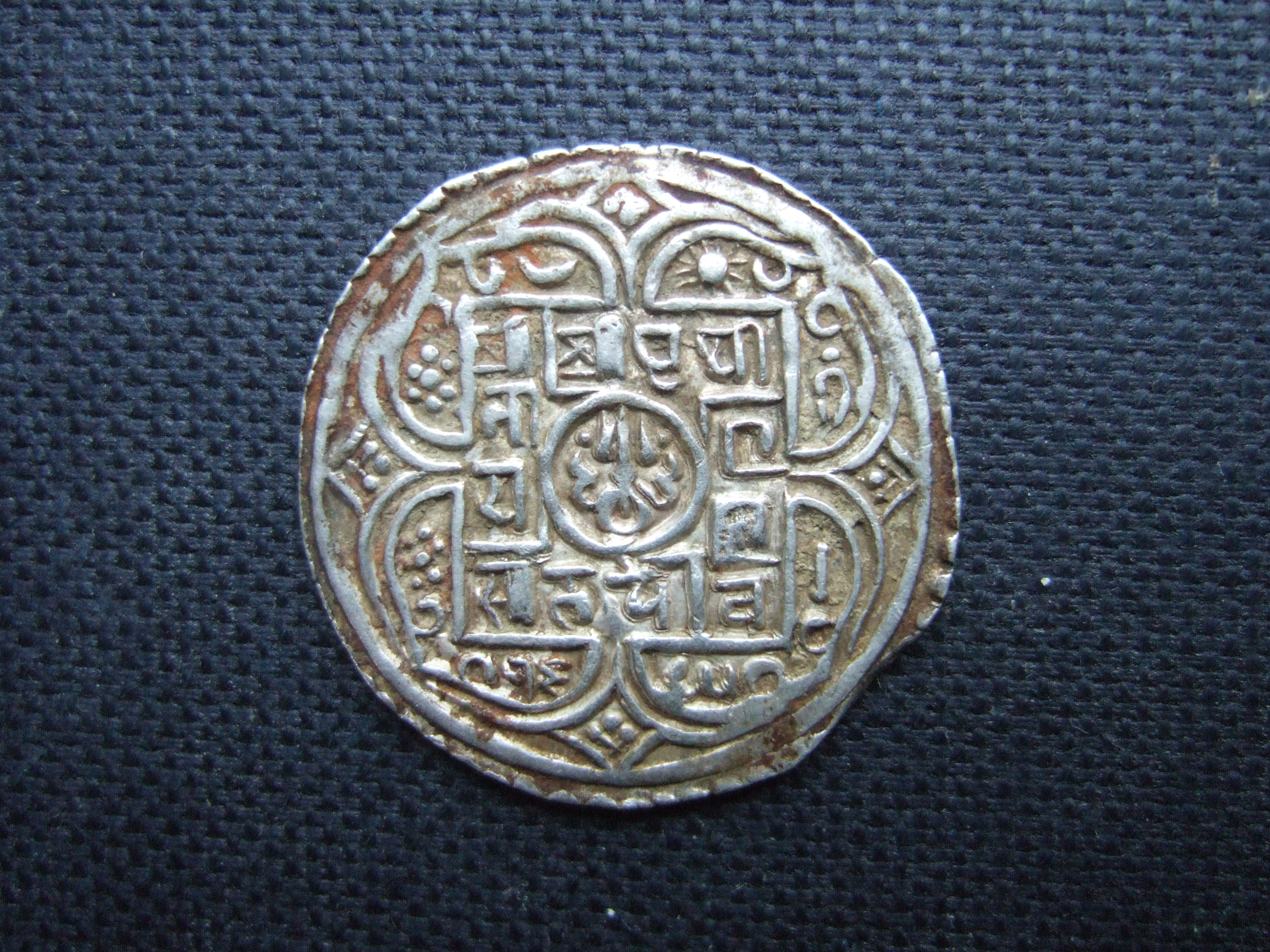
Mohar of Gorkhali king Prithvi Narayan Shah dated Shaka era 1685 (AD 1763)

The origin of the Shaka era is highly controversial. There are two Shaka era systems in scholarly use, one is called Old Shaka Era, whose epoch is uncertain, probably sometime in the 1st millennium BCE because ancient Buddhist and Jaina inscriptions and texts use it, but this is a subject of dispute among scholars. The uncounted first year of the era is numbered as year zero.

By comparing eclipses mentioned in inscriptions, Vedveer Arya (researcher of Indian history and MA in Sanskrit) has argued that the Old Shaka Era began with the beginning of the reign of the first Shaka king and that it began in 582 BC.

The other is called Shaka Era of 78 CE, or simply Shaka Era, a system that is common in epigraphic evidence from southern India. A parallel northern India system is the Vikrama Era, which is used by the Vikrami calendar linked to Vikramaditya.

The beginning of the Shaka era is now widely equated to the ascension of Indo-Scythian king Chashtana in 78 CE. His inscriptions, dated to the years 11 and 52, have been found at Andhau in Kutch region. These years are interpreted as Shaka years 11 (89 CE) and 52 (130 CE).A previously more common view was that the beginning of the Shaka era corresponds to the ascension of Kanishka I in 78 CE. However, the latest research by Henry Falk indicated that Kanishka ascended the throne in 127 CE. Moreover, Kanishka was not a Shaka, but a Kushana ruler. Other historical candidates have included rulers such as Vima Kadphises, Vonones, and Nahapana.

According to historian Dineshchandra Sircar, the historically inaccurate notion of "Shalivahana era" appears to be based on the victory of the Satavahana ruler Gautamiputra Satakarni over some Shaka (Western Kshatrapa) kings. Sircar also suggested that the association of the northern king Vikramaditya with Vikrama era might have led the southern scholars to fabricate a similar legend.grandson of legendary emperor Vikramaditya defeated the Shakas in 78 CE, and the Shaka era marks the day of this conquest. This legend has been mentioned in the writings of Brahmagupta (7th century CE), Al-Biruni (973–1048 CE), and others. However it is an obvious fabrication. Over time, the word "Shaka" became generic, and came to be mean "an era"; the era thus came to be known as "Shalivahana Shaka".

== Usage ==
The earliest known users of the era are the Western Satraps, the Shaka (Indo-Scythian) rulers of Ujjain. From the reign of Rudrasimha I (178–197), they recorded the date of minting of their coins in the Shaka era, usually written on the obverse behind the king's head in Brahmi numerals.

The use of the calendar era survived into the Gupta period and became part of Hindu tradition following the decline of Buddhism in the Indian subcontinent. It was in widespread use by the 6th to 7th centuries, e.g. in the works of Varāhamihira and Brahmagupta, and by the 7th century also appears in epigraphy in Hindu Southeast Asia.

The calendar era remained in use in India and Southeast Asia throughout the medieval period, the main alternative era in traditional Hindu timekeeping being the Vikram Samvat era (56 BC). It was used by Javanese courts until 1633, when it was replaced by Anno Javanico, a hybrid Javanese-Islamic system. It continues to be used in the Balinese saka calendar. It was adopted as the era of the Indian national calendar (also known as "Śaka calendar") in 1957.

The Shaka epoch is the vernal equinox of the year AD 78. The year of the official Shaka Calendar is tied to the Gregorian date of 22 March every year, except in Gregorian leap years when it starts on 21 March. The Lunisolar Shalivaahana Saka continues to be used widely in Southern and Western India for many religious and some secular purposes such as sowing and agriculture.

== See also ==
- Shaka Samvat – Hindu calendar era
- Gregorian calendar
- Indian national calendar
- Vikram Samvat
