= Juan Gutiérrez de Gualda =

Spanish 16th-century mathematician

- Born: 16th century probably Gualda in Cifuentes, Guadalajara, now Spain
- Died: 16th century unknown place
- Scientific career
- Fields: Mathematics

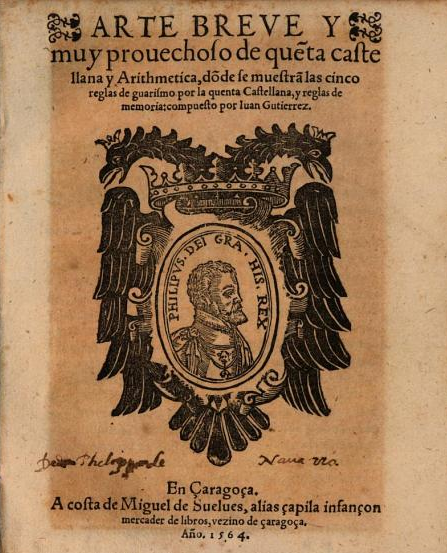
Front page of the 1564 edition

Juan Gutiérrez de Gualda (16th century) was a priest and mathematician known to be the author of a popular book on arithmetic.

== Life and work ==
Nothing is known about his life except he was the priest of Villarejo de Fuentes, province of Cuenca.

Gutiérrez is known by his book on arithmetic which was very successful in his times: Arte breve y muy provechoso de cuenta castellana y arismética (Toledo 1539). The book was reedited not less than five times in 16th century. It consist in a short arithmetic for merchants, very basic, which only contains forty pages and practically only explains the four rules and few more. The book is an example of the transition from roman numerals to arabic numerals because it resolves the problems with arabics (quenta arismetica), but it gives his expression in romans (quenta castellana). His success was in big part due to the fact that Juan de Yciar included it as an annex of his book on calligraphy from 1564.

== Bibliography ==
- Ausejo, Elena (2015). "New Perspectives on Commercial Arithmetic in Renaissance Spain". In David E. Rowe; Wann-Sheng Horng (eds.). A Delicate Balance: Global Perspectives on Innovation and Tradition in the History of Mathematics. Birkhäuser. pp. 181–210. ISBN 978-3-319-12029-4.
- Caunedo del Potro, Betsabé; Córdoba de la Llave, Ricardo (2004). "Oficios urbanos y desarrollo de la ciencia y de la técnica en la Baja Edad Media". Norba. Revista de historia (in Spanish). 17: 41–68. ISSN 0213-375X.
- Salavert Fabiani, Vicent (1990). "Introducción a la historia de la aritmética práctica en la corona de Aragón en el siglo XVI". Dynamis (in Spanish). 10: 63–91. ISSN 0211-9536.
- Usón Villalba, Carlos (2004). "Aritméticas aragonesas del s. XVI: a la sombra del quadrivium". In Luis Español González; José Javier Escribano Benito; María Angeles Martínez García (eds.). Actas del 8º Congreso de la Sociedad Española de Historia de las Ciencias y de las Técnicas (Logroño, 2002) (in Spanish). Universidad de La Rioja. pp. 453–471. ISBN 84-88713-26-6.
