= Lienhart Holle =

15th-century German printer

Lienhart Holle, also Holl, was a 15th-century German printer. He is known as the third book printer in the city of Ulm. Early in his printing career, Holle produced playing cards. Between 1482 and 1484, his workshop produced several significant works of early book printing. His most notable achievement is considered to be the first atlas printed north of the Alps, the Ulm Ptolemy. Lienhart Holle died after 1492.

== Biography ==
He had worked as a formschneider and woodcut dealer.

=== Ulm Ptolemy ===
The Ulm Ptolemy, the Ulm edition of Ptolemy's world map, which was part of the Geographia series, is described as the first map atlas printed north of Alps; the first atlas to be printed in more northern areas of Europe.

It is a map of the Old World, shown as Africa and Eurasia. Although Ptolemy's map had received new updates, the Portuguese discoveries in Africa were removed during the revision. The map includes twelve wind heads that surround the outer area, and a land bridge that encloses the Indian Ocean.

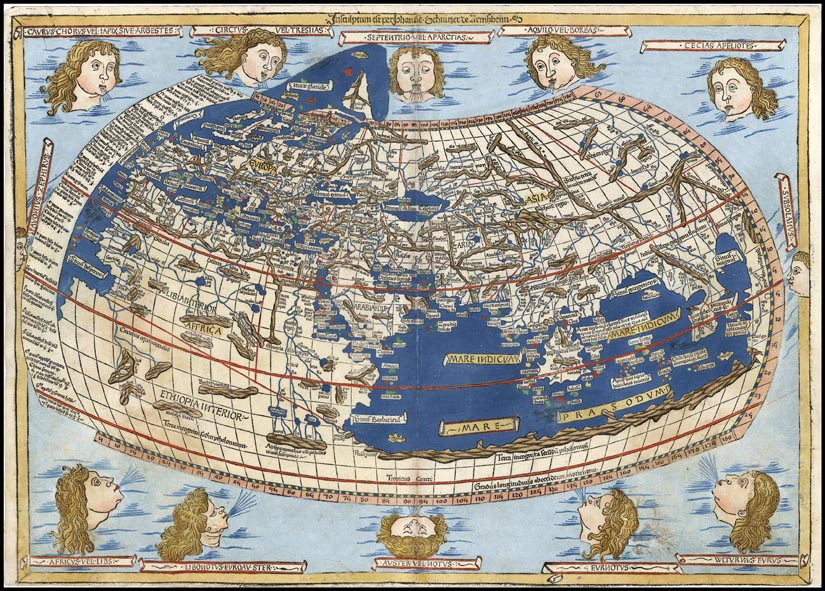
The Ulm Ptolemy

=== Debts & end of career ===
Holle's works were extremely elaborate with much attention to details and were expensive to make. A poor market for publishments like Holle's left him without income. Unable to pay, his patron, who had provided him with the necessary equipment for printing through mortgaging, took the printing blocks and typeset. Holle fled Ulm in 1484. It is not known when or where his death occurred.
