= Karl Menninger (mathematics) =

German mathematician (1898–1963)

Karl Menninger (October 6, 1898 – October 2, 1963) was a German teacher of and writer about mathematics. His major work was Zahlwort und Ziffer (1934; English trans., Number Words and Number Symbols), about non-academic mathematics in much of the world. (The omission of Africa was rectified by Claudia Zaslavsky in her book Africa Counts.)
