= Durango Airport =

Durango Airport can refer to:

- Durango–La Plata County Airport, an airport serving Durango, Colorado, United States
- General Guadalupe Victoria International Airport, an airport near the city of Durango, Mexico
