= Bombing of Durango =

Attack by military aircraft during the Spanish Civil War

Coordinates: 43°10′N 2°38′W

- Part of the Spanish Civil War
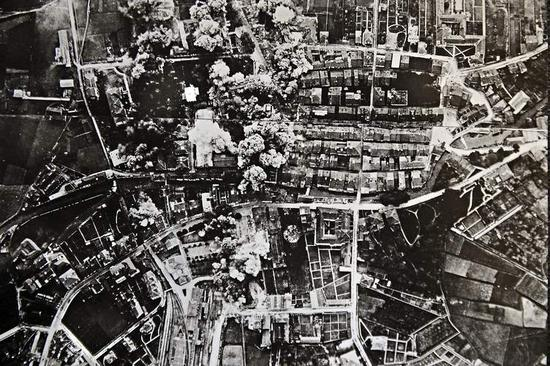
- Photo of the bombing taken by an Italian pilot.
| Date | 31 March 1937 |
| Location | Durango, Biscay, Spain |
| Result | The town of Durango was destroyed |

Belligerents
| (Spain) Spanish Republic | (Kingdom of Italy) Aviazione Legionaria (Nazi Germany) Condor Legion |

Strength
| Anti-aircraft artillery | He-51 and CR.32 fighters 9 SM.81 bombers |

Casualties and losses
| 248–250 civilians killed | None |

The bombing of Durango took place on 31 March 1937, during the Spanish Civil War. On 31 March 1937, the Nationalists started their offensive against the Republican held province of Biscay. As part of the offensive the Aviazione Legionaria and the Legion Condor bombed Durango, a town of 10,000 inhabitants that was also a key road and railway junction behind the frontline. Around 250 people are believed to have died in the bombing.

== Background ==
On 31 March 1937, the Nationalist forces, led by Emilio Mola, started the offensive against the Republican held, Vizcaya Province. Mola said that: "I have decided to terminate rapidly the war in the north: those not guilty of assassinations and who surrender their arms will have their lives and property spared. But, if submission is not immediate, I will raze all Vizcaya to the ground, beginning with the industries of war". The same day the Nationalists bombed the towns of Durango and Elorrio.

== The bombing ==
Durango, a town of 10,000 inhabitants, was a road and railway junction between Bilbao and the front. By bombing the road and infrastructure in the town, the Republican forces would be prevented from sending reinforcements from Bilbao. It would also ensure that the Basque and Republican troops couldn't retreat in an orderly fashion in order to fight another day.

Despite the importance of Durango as a transportation junction, the town had no air defences, and there were only a few Republican fighter planes to be found in the Basque region.

On 31 March, German and Italian transport planes modified to carry bombs (German Ju 52 and Italian Savoia-Marchetti SM.81) from the Condor Legion and the Aviazione Legionaria bombed the town in relays. Two churches were bombed during the celebration of mass, killing 14 nuns and the officiated priest. Furthermore, Heinkel He 51 fighters strafed fleeing civilians. Altogether, around 250 civilians (Thomas: 248; Beevor: 250 and Preston: 258) died in the attack.

== Aftermath ==
On 28 April, Durango fell to Nationalist side. While the local road junction meant that Durango was a legitimate target for an air attack and the bombing did not contravene the laws of war as they were at the time, foreign observers were shocked at the carnage.

The Nationalists denied responsibility for the bombing, claiming that the priest and the nuns who died in the bombing were killed and burned by the reds. Queipo de llano said that: "our planes bombed military targets in Durango, and later communists and socialists locked up the priests and nuns, shooting without pity and burning the churches".

The bombing of Durango was to a certain extent overlooked historically. Instead, it was the bombing of Guernica, a similar air attack that took place four weeks later, that came to symbolize the horrors of modern aerial warfare in the public consciousness.

== See also ==
- Aviazione Legionaria
- Condor Legion
- List of aircraft of the Spanish Republican Air Force
