= Damasena =

Western Kshatrapa ruler from 223 to 232

- Western Satrap king
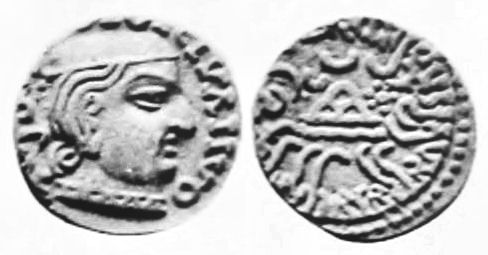
- Coin of Western Satrap Damasena.
- Reign: 223-232 CE
- Predecessor: Sanghadaman
- Successor: Isvaradatta
- Father: Rudrasimha I

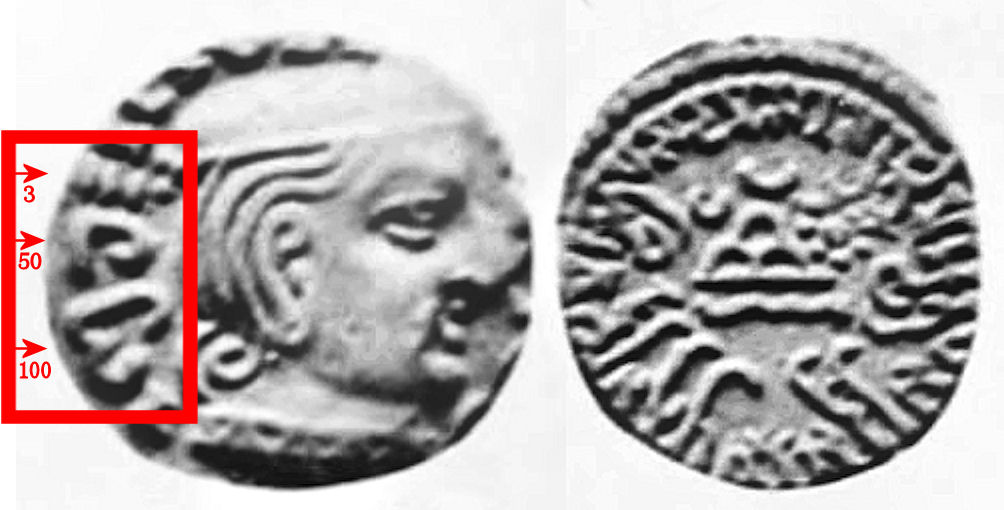
Coin of Damasena. The minting date, here 153 (100-50-3 in Brahmi script numerals) of the Saka era, therefore 232 CE, clearly appears behind the head of the king.

Damasena was a Western Kshatrapa ruler, who reigned from 223 to 232 CE. From the reign of Rudrasimha I, the date of minting of each coin, reckoned in the Saka era, is usually written on the obverse behind the king's head in Brahmi numerals, allowing for the quite precise dating of the rule of each king. This is a rather uncommon case in Indian numismatics. Some, such as the numismatist R.C Senior considered that these dates might correspond to the much earlier Azes era instead.

== Notes ==
| Territories/ dates | Western India | Western Pakistan Balochistan | Paropamisadae Arachosia | Bajaur | Gandhara | Western Punjab | Eastern Punjab | Mathura |
|---|---|---|---|---|---|---|---|---|
| | | | INDO-GREEK KINGDOM | | | | | |
| 90–85 BCE | | | Nicias | Menander II | | Artemidoros | | |
| 90–70 BCE | | | Hermaeus | Archebius | | | | |
| 85-60 BCE | | | INDO-SCYTHIAN KINGDOM; Maues | | | | | |
| 75–70 BCE | | | Vonones; Spalahores | Telephos | | Apollodotus II | | |
| 65–55 BCE | | | Spalirises; Spalagadames | | | Hippostratos | Dionysios | |
| 55–35 BCE | | | Azes I | | | | Zoilos II | |
| 55–35 BCE | | | Azilises; Azes II | | | | Apollophanes | Indo-Scythian dynasty of the NORTHERN SATRAPS; Hagamasha |
| 25 BCE – 10 CE | | | | Indo-Scythian dynasty of the APRACHARAJAS; Vijayamitra (ruled 12 BCE - 15 CE) (Note: From the dated inscription on the Rukhana reliquary) | Liaka Kusulaka; Patika Kusulaka; Zeionises | Kharahostes (ruled 10 BCE– 10 CE) (Note: An Inscribed Silver Buddhist Reliquary of the Time of King Kharaosta and Prince Indravarman, Richard Salomon, Journal of the American Oriental Society, Vol. 116, No. 3 (Jul. - Sep., 1996), pp. 442); Mujatria | Strato II and Strato III | Hagana |
| 10-20 CE | | INDO-PARTHIAN KINGDOM; Gondophares | | Indravasu | INDO-PARTHIAN KINGDOM; Gondophares | | Rajuvula | |
| 20-30 CE | | | Ubouzanes; Pakores | Vispavarma (ruled c.0-20 CE) (Note: A Kharosthī Reliquary Inscription of the Time of the Apraca Prince Visnuvarma, by Richard Salomon, South Asian Studies 11 1995, Pages 27-32, Published online: 09 Aug 2010) | Sarpedones | | Bhadayasa | Sodasa |
| 30-40 CE | | | KUSHAN EMPIRE; Kujula Kadphises | Indravarma | Abdagases | | ... | ... |
| 40-45 CE | | | | Aspavarma | Gadana | | ... | ... |
| 45-50 CE | | | | Sasan | Sases | | ... | ... |
| 50-75 CE | | | | | | | ... | ... |
| 75-100 CE | Indo-Scythian dynasty of the WESTERN SATRAPS; Chastana | | Vima Takto | | | | ... | ... |
| 100-120 CE | Abhiraka | | Vima Kadphises | | | | ... | ... |
| 120 CE | Bhumaka; Nahapana | PARATARAJAS; Yolamira | Kanishka I | | | | Great Satrap Kharapallana and Satrap Vanaspara for Kanishka I | |
| 130-230 CE | Jayadaman; Rudradaman I Damajadasri I Jivadaman; Rudrasimha I Satyadaman; Jivadaman; Rudrasena I | Bagamira; Arjuna; Hvaramira; Mirahvara | Vāsishka (c. 140 – c. 160); Huvishka (c. 160 – c. 190); Vasudeva I (c. 190 – to at least 230) | | | | | |
| 230-280 CE | Samghadaman; Damasena; Damajadasri II; Viradaman; Isvaradatta; Yasodaman I Vijayasena; Damajadasri III; Rudrasena II; Visvasimha | Miratakhma; Kozana; Bhimarjuna; Koziya; Datarvharna; Datarvharna | INDO-SASANIANS; Ardashir I, Sassanid king and "Kushanshah" (c. 230 – 250); Peroz I, "Kushanshah" (c. 250 – 265); Hormizd I, "Kushanshah" (c. 265 – 295) | | | Kanishka II (c. 230 – 240); Vashishka (c. 240 – 250); Kanishka III (c. 250 – 275) | | |
| 280-300 CE | Bhratadarman | Datayola II | Hormizd II, "Kushanshah" (c. 295 – 300) | | | Vasudeva II (c. 275 – 310) | | |
| 300-320 CE | Visvasena; Rudrasimha II; Jivadaman | | Peroz II, "Kushanshah" (c. 300 – 325) | | | Vasudeva III; Vasudeva IV; Vasudeva V Chhu (c. 310? – 325) | | |
| 320-388 CE | Yasodaman II; Rudradaman II; Rudrasena III; Simhasena; Rudrasena IV | | Shapur II Sassanid king and "Kushanshah" (c. 325); Varhran I, Varhran II, Varhran III "Kushanshahs" (c. 325 – 350); Peroz III "Kushanshah" (c. 350 –360); HEPHTHALITE/ HUNAS invasions | | | Shaka I (c. 325 – 345); Kipunada (c. 345 – 375) | | GUPTA EMPIRE; Chandragupta I Samudragupta |
| 388-395 CE | Rudrasimha III | | Chandragupta II | | | | | |
