= Canton of Millas =

Coordinates: 42.6925°N 2.6964°E

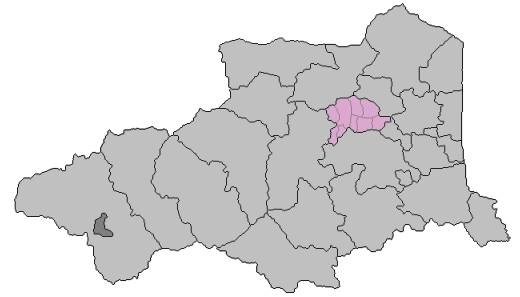
Location of the canton in Pyrénées-Orientales

The Canton of Millas is a French former canton of the Pyrénées-Orientales department, in the Languedoc-Roussillon region. It had 23,008 inhabitants (2012). It was disbanded following the French canton reorganisation which came into effect in March 2015.

== Composition ==
The canton comprised the following communes:

- Millas
- Corbère
- Corbère-les-Cabanes
- Corneilla-la-Rivière
- Néfiach
- Pézilla-la-Rivière
- Saint-Féliu-d'Amont
- Saint-Féliu-d'Avall
- Le Soler
