= Feliu =

Feliu or Féliu or Feliú may refer to:

== People ==
- Antonio de Olaguer y Feliú (1740–1810), Spanish soldier and politician, Viceroy of the Rio de la Plata and Secretary of War of King Charles IV
- Jordi Xumetra Feliú (born 1985), Spanish footballer
- José Olaguer Feliú (1857–1929), Spanish Lieutenant General, Minister of War and politician
- Manuel Olaguer Feliú (1759–1824), Spanish Field Marshal and Captain General of Galicia
- Melchor Feliú, appointed governor of Florida in 1762
- Núria Feliu (1941–2022), Catalan singer and actress
- Feliu Formosa (born 1934), Catalan dramatist, poet and translator
- Feliu Ventura (born 1976), Valencian singer-songwriter
- Josep Feliú i Codina (1845–1897), Catalan journalist, novelist and playwright

== Places ==
- Saint-Féliu-d'Amont, a town and commune in the Pyrénées-Orientales département, in southwestern France
- Saint-Féliu-d'Avall, a town and commune in the Pyrénées-Orientales département, in southwestern France
- Sant Feliu de Codines, a municipality in the comarca of the Vallès Oriental in Catalonia, Spain
- Sant Feliu de Guíxols, a municipality in the comarca of the Baix Empordà in Catalonia, Spain
- Sant Feliu de Llobregat, a city and municipality in Catalonia, Spain, in the province of Barcelona

== Ecclesiastical regions ==
- Roman Catholic Diocese of Sant Feliu de Llobregat, in the Ecclesiastical province of Barcelona in Spain
