= Ille-sur-Têt =

- Commune
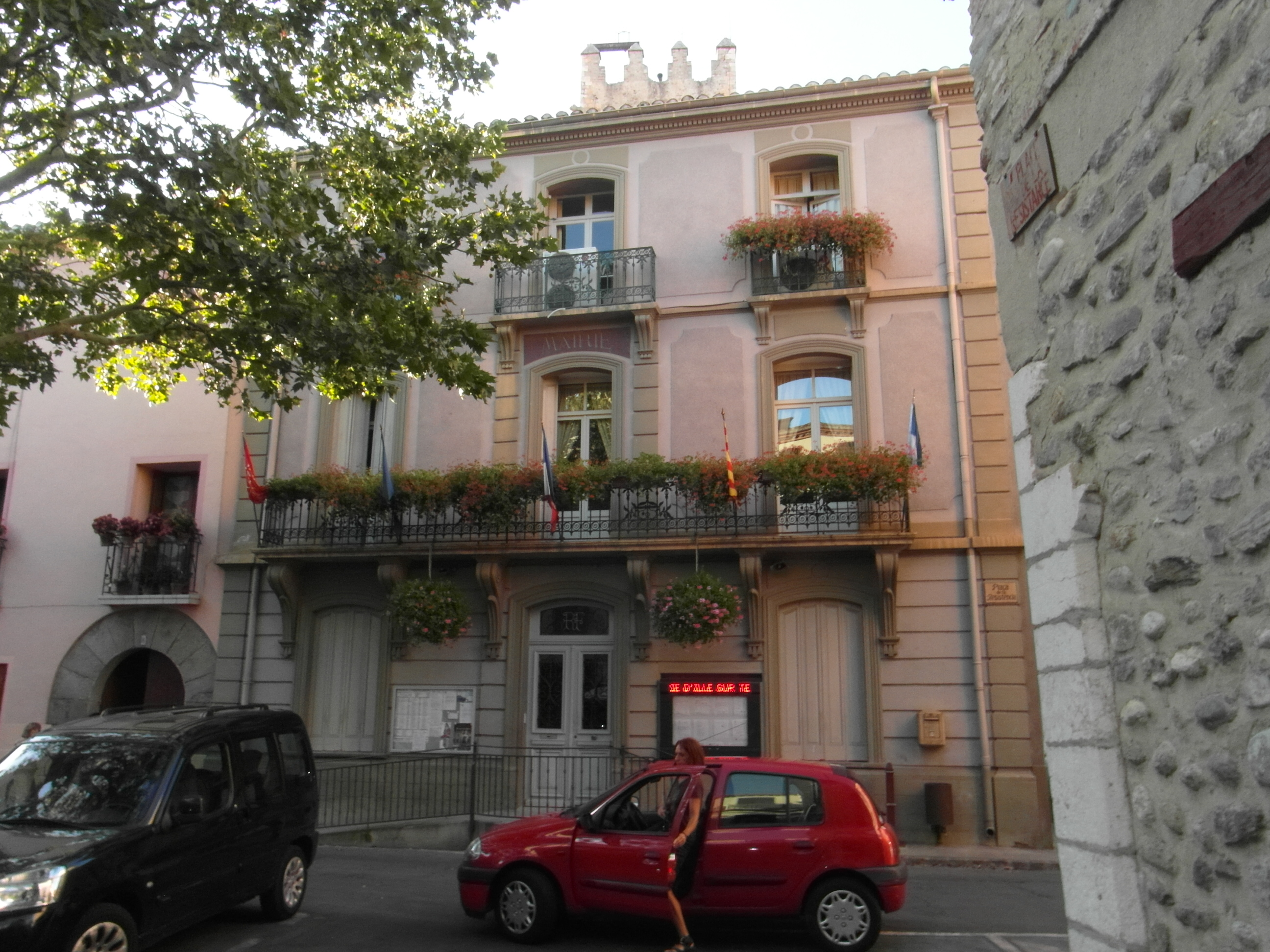
- The town hall in Ille-sur-Têt

- Coat of arms
- Location of Ille-sur-Têt
- Location within France Location within Occitanie
- Coordinates: 42°40′18″N 2°37′17″E
- Country: France
- Region: Occitania
- Department: Pyrénées-Orientales
- Arrondissement: Prades
- Canton: La Vallée de la Têt
- Intercommunality: Roussillon Conflent

Government
  - Mayor (2020–2026): William Burghoffer
- Area^{1}: 31.67 km^{2} (12.23 sq mi)
- Elevation: 160 m (520 ft)
- Highest elevation: 446 m (1,463 ft)
- Lowest elevation: 110 m (360 ft)
- Population (2023): 5,556
  - Density: 175.4/km^{2} (454.4/sq mi)
- Time zone: UTC+01:00 (CET)
  - Summer (DST): UTC+02:00 (CEST)
- INSEE/Postal code: 66088 /66130
- ^{1} French Land Register data, which excludes lakes, ponds, glaciers > 1 km^{2} (0.386 sq mi or 247 acres) and river estuaries.

Ille-sur-Têt (French pronunciation: [ij syʁ tɛt]; Catalan: Illa or Illa de Tet) is a commune in the Pyrénées-Orientales département in southern France.

Its inhabitants are called Illois.

== Geography ==
The commune is situated in the Ribéral region along the route nationale 116 and is crossed by the river Têt (in the north), as well as by its tributary, the Boulès (in the south). It is one of the gateways to the Fenouillèdes region (towards Montalba-le-Château or Bélesta).

Ille-sur-Têt is located in the canton of La Vallée de la Têt and in the arrondissement of Prades.

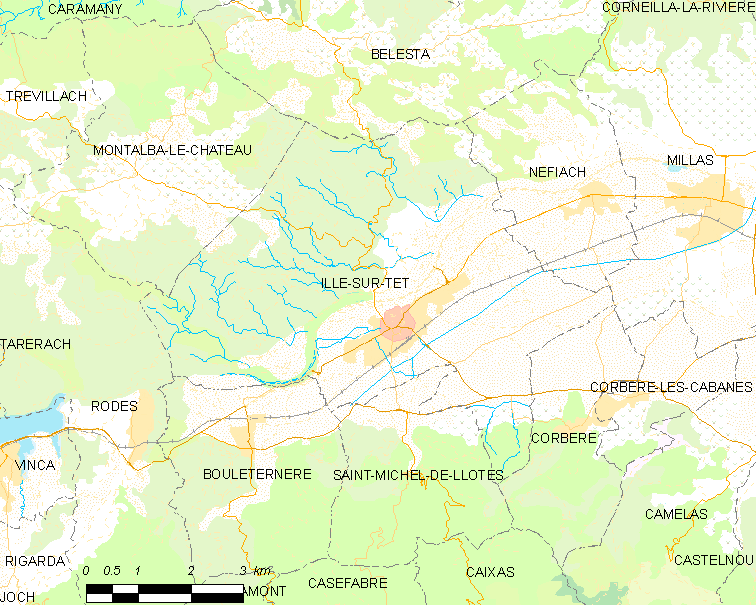
Map of Ille-sur-Têt and its surrounding communes

=== Geology and relief ===
The commune covers an area of 3,167 hectares. The altitude varies between 110 and 446 metres.

The commune is classified in seismicity zone 3, corresponding to moderate seismicity.

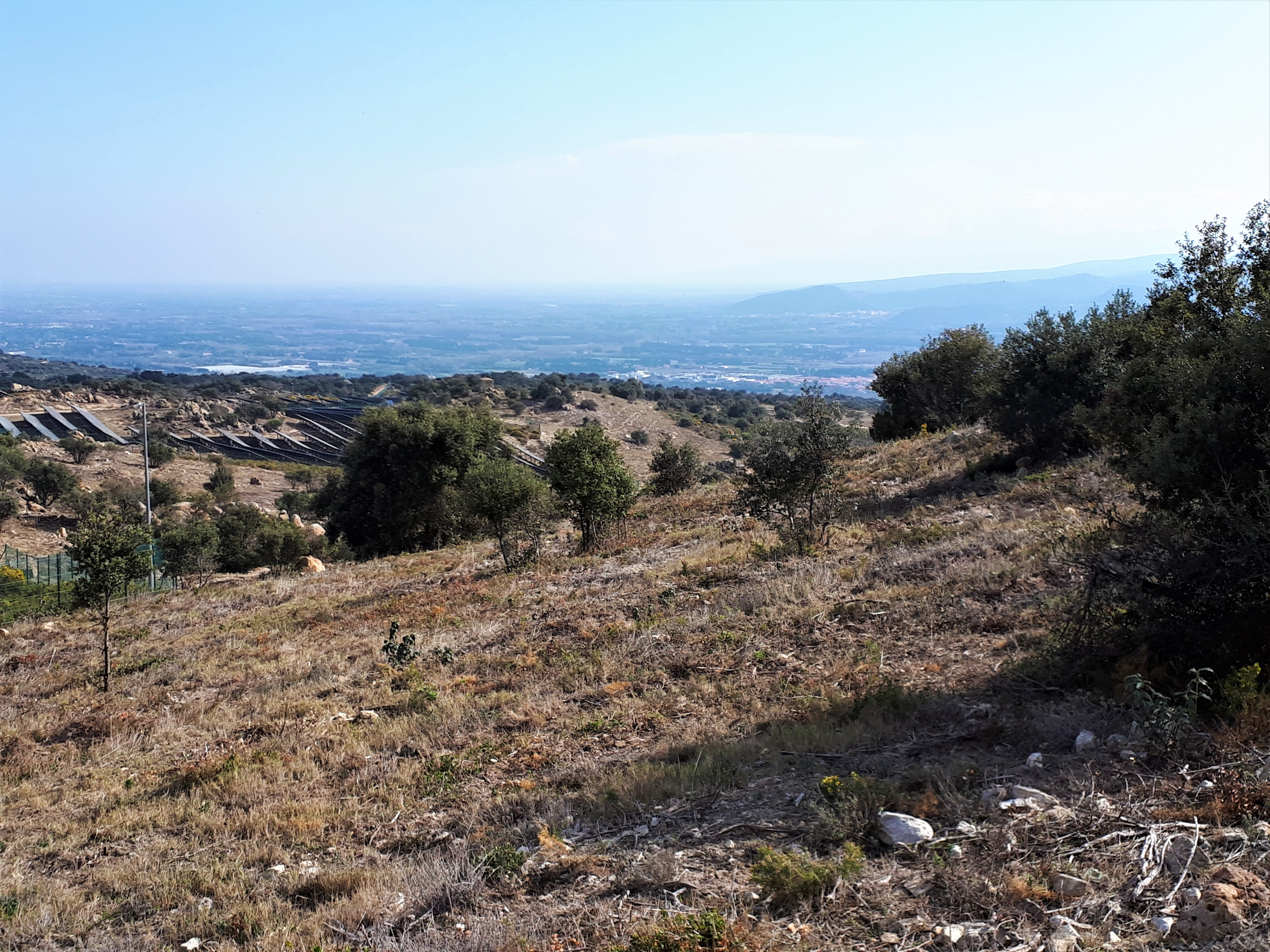
View looking south-east towards the town of Ille-sur-Têt. The town (in the centre and slightly to the right) lies close to the River Têt. To the north-west of this river lies a granite plateau (of Hercynian date, around 300 million years old), which can be seen here with solar panels. To the south-east of the Têt, around and beyond the town, is a series of recent Quaternary river terraces. Beyond (and beyond the commune) rise the Aspres hills, where some formations are over 500 million years old. The Roussillon plain (Neogene and Quaternary) extends to the east (left).

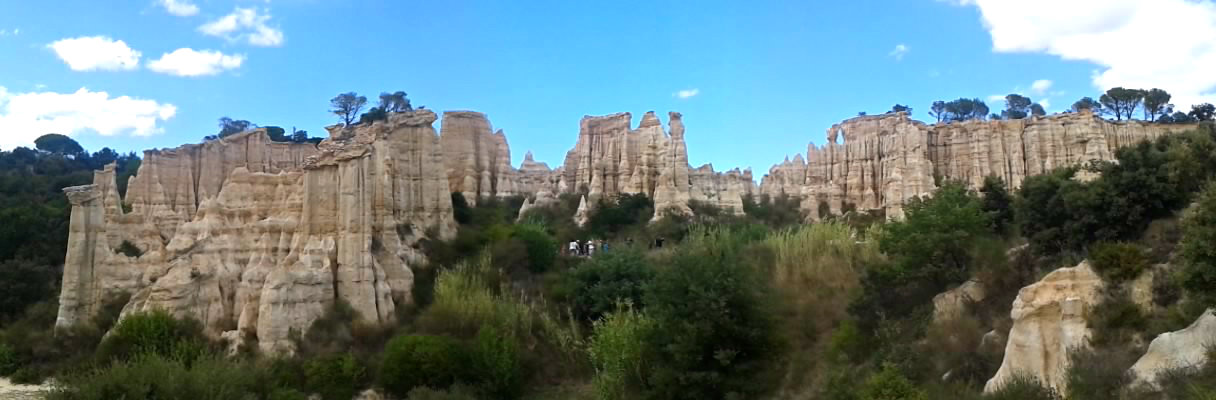
The "Orgues" of Ille-sur-Têt.

The commune is also geologically characterised by the existence in its territory of chimney-like structures which have been named the "Orgues" (organ pipes) of Ille-sur-Têt. These have been cut into Pliocene sediments. The Pliocene outcrop in the commune lies between the foot of the granite plateau and the Têt river, around one kilometre north of the town.

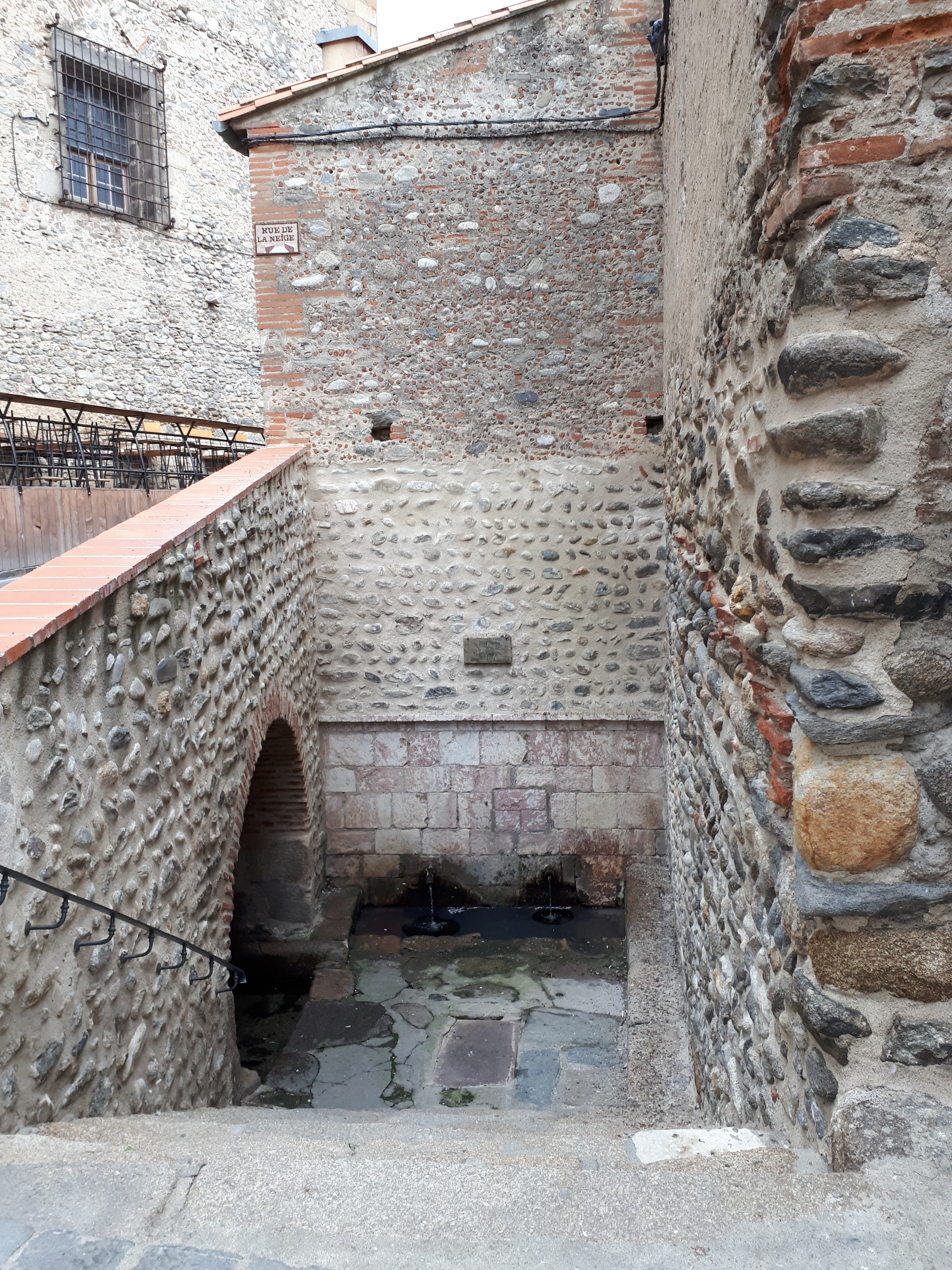
Font de la Vila (or Quatre Canalots), Rue de la Neige, Ille-sur-Têt.

The town of Ille-sur-Têt itself was built on a river terrace which is located just to the south of the River Têt and its current floodplain, at an altitude of a few metres above that floodplain. A number of natural springs occur on or near the northern edge of that terrace, where it slopes down to the floodplain. Some of those springs have been used for centuries as "fonts" (fountains), supplying fresh water to the town and its surrounding area. An example is the "Font de la Vila", which is located at the bottom of some steps, just inside the town's old walls.

The river terrace ("Fy" on the geological map) is thought to have formed towards the end of the most recent (Würm, or Devensian) glacial period. The flood plain ("Fz") is of recent (Holocene) age.

== Population ==
Historical population
| Year | Pop. | ±% p.a. |
|---|---|---|
| 1968 | 5,262 | — |
| 1975 | 5,258 | −0.01% |
| 1982 | 5,249 | −0.02% |
| 1990 | 5,095 | −0.37% |
| 1999 | 4,993 | −0.22% |
| 2007 | 5,244 | +0.61% |
| 2012 | 5,354 | +0.42% |
| 2017 | 5,446 | +0.34% |
| 2023 | 5,556 | +0.33% |
Source: INSEE

== Sites of interest ==
- The 17th century Saint-Étienne Church
- The 12th century Sainte-Marie de la Rodona Church
- The 17th century Hospice Saint-Jacques d'Ille-sur-Tet (Hospici d'Illa in Catalan)
- The geological site of the Orgues d'Ille-sur-Têt, 10–12 m tall hoodoos

== Notable people ==
- Jean Bardou (1799-1852), industrialist, born in Ille-sur-Têt.
- Charles Dupuy (1851-1923), died in Ille-sur-Têt in 1923, President of the Council of Ministers under Presidents Sadi Carnot, Jean Casimir-Perier, Félix Faure and Émile Loubet.
- Joseph-Sébastien Pons (1886-1962), poet, born and dead in Ille-sur-Têt.
- Xavier de Gaulle (1887-1955), civil engineer (mines), Second World War résistant. Arrested but released as a veteran, the Vichy regime sent him to Ille-sur-Têt as a tax inspector but he remained under police surveillance. He fled to Switzerland where in 1944 he was made Consul Général de France, a post he held until 1953.
- Pierre Fouché (1891-1967), died in Ille-sur-Têt, linguist.
- Jean Galia (1905-1949), born in Ille-sur-Têt, rugby union and rugby league player.
- Louis Amade (1915–1992), born in Ille-sur-Têt, writer, songwriter for Gilbert Bécaud and Édith Piaf among others.
- Paul Blanc (1937-), former Senator for Pyrénées-Orientales and mayor of Sournia, born in Ille-sur-Têt.
- Paul Loridant (1948-), born in Ille-sur-Têt, Senator for Essonne .

== In fiction ==
Prosper Mérimée's short story La Vénus d'Ille takes place in Ille-sur-Têt.

== See also ==
- Communes of the Pyrénées-Orientales department
