= Paul Blanc =

French politician (born 1937)

Paul Blanc (Ille-sur-Têt, 29 January 1937) was a member of the Senate of France since 1992, and re-elected in 2001, representing to 2011 the Pyrénées-Orientales department. He was a member of the Union for a Popular Movement. He was also the mayor of Prades then of Sournia, in Pyrénées-Orientales.
