= Canton of La Vallée de la Têt =

Coordinates: 42.68°N 2.79°E

The canton of La Vallée de la Têt is an administrative division of the Pyrénées-Orientales department, in southern France. It was created at the French canton reorganisation which came into effect in March 2015. Its seat is in Le Soler.

It consists of the following communes:

1. Corbère
2. Corbère-les-Cabanes
3. Corneilla-la-Rivière
4. Ille-sur-Têt
5. Millas
6. Montalba-le-Château
7. Néfiach
8. Saint-Féliu-d'Amont
9. Saint-Féliu-d'Avall
10. Le Soler
