= Millas train-bus collision =

2017 Train vs. bus crash in France

Perpignan crash
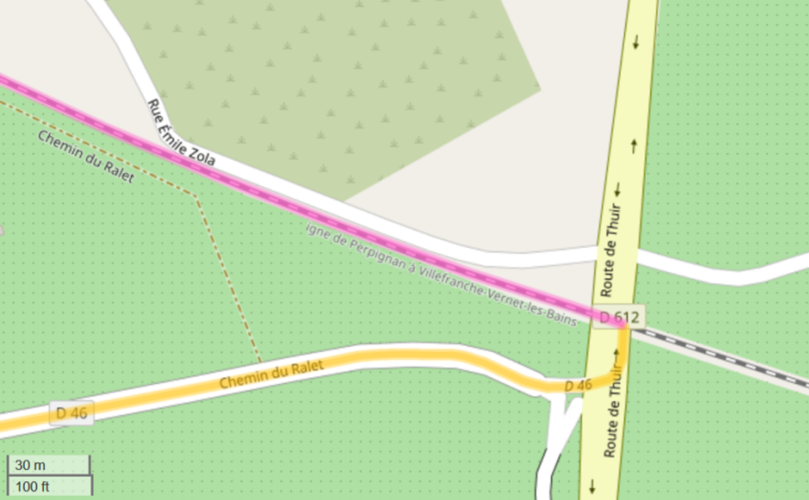
- Area map of the crash site with routes of school bus (yellow line) and train (purple line) before collision.

Details
- Date: 14 December 2017 around 16:00 CET (15:00 UTC)
- Location: Millas, Arrondissement of Perpignan, Occitanie
- Coordinates: 42.68547°N 2.70399°E
- Country: France
- Line: Perpignan – Villefranche-de-Conflent
- Operator: SNCF
- Incident type: Collision with a road vehicle on a level crossing
- Cause: Under investigation

Statistics
- Deaths: 6 (the fifth victim died the day after the crash, the sixth was announced on 18 December)
- Injured: 24

The Perpignan crash occurred on about 4pm 14 December 2017 at a level crossing in the commune of Millas, in the French department of Pyrénées-Orientales, between a coach carrying high school students and a TER train, which connects Villefranche - Vernet-les-Bains and Perpignan stations.

Six pupils on board were killed and 24 were seriously injured by the accident. Trains between Perpignan and Villefranche were cancelled.

== Vehicles involved ==
=== Bus ===
The road vehicle is a school bus Irisbus Récréo of the company Autocars Faur based in Toulouse that brought back 23 students.

=== Train ===
The railway vehicle is a self-propelled train of series Z 7300 (element Z 7369).

== Place ==
The collision occurred at a level crossing equipped with two half-gates, about one kilometre from the school, at the automatic level crossing No. 25 of the line from Perpignan to Villefranche - Vernet-les-Bains at the place known as Los Palaus in the commune of Millas, about twenty kilometres west of Perpignan on departmental road 612 (named Route de Thuir on this section).

== Victims ==
Four pupils on board were killed on the day, and 24 were seriously injured – one of whom died the following day. A sixth fatality was recorded on 18 December.

== Investigation ==
While visiting the scene, Prime Minister Édouard Philippe said that the "circumstances of this terrible drama are still undetermined." The Minister of Transport Élisabeth Borne also visited the scene. An SNCF official said "several witnesses said the barrier was down" at the time of the crash. According to her employer, the bus driver says that the barriers were up and safe. Drugs and alcohol tests for both the train and the bus drivers were negative.
