= Le Soler =

Le Soler El Soler
- Commune
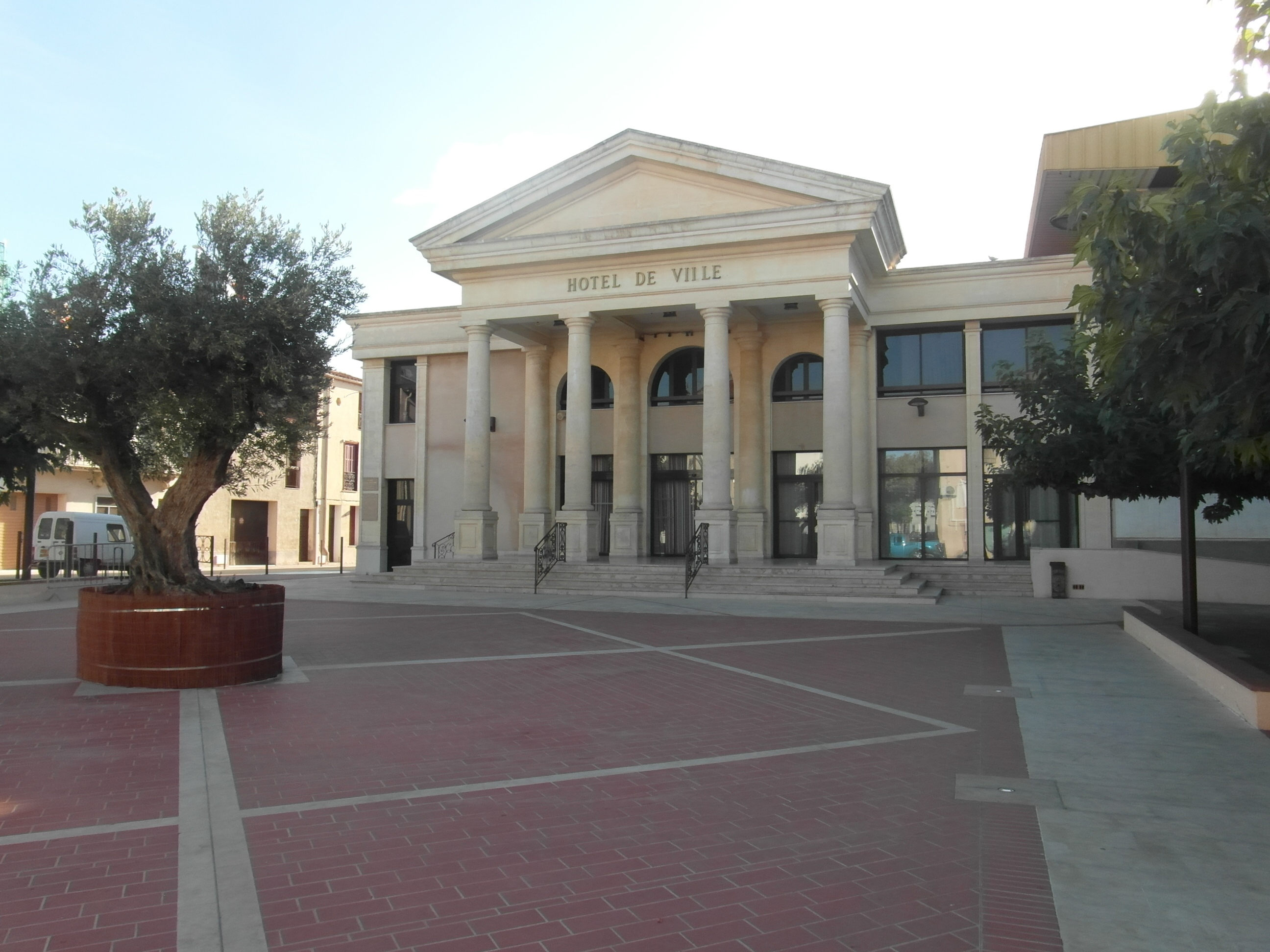
- The town hall in Le Soler

- Coat of arms
- Location of Le Soler
- Location within France Location within Occitanie
- Coordinates: 42°40′58″N 2°47′38″E
- Country: France
- Region: Occitania
- Department: Pyrénées-Orientales
- Arrondissement: Perpignan
- Canton: La Vallée de la Têt
- Intercommunality: Perpignan Méditerranée Métropole

Government
  - Mayor (2020–2026): Armelle Revel Fourcade
- Area^{1}: 10.35 km^{2} (4.00 sq mi)
- Elevation: 73 m (240 ft)
- Highest elevation: 92 m (302 ft)
- Lowest elevation: 43 m (141 ft)
- Population (2023): 7,942
  - Density: 767.3/km^{2} (1,987/sq mi)
- Time zone: UTC+01:00 (CET)
  - Summer (DST): UTC+02:00 (CEST)
- INSEE/Postal code: 66195 /66270
- ^{1} French Land Register data, which excludes lakes, ponds, glaciers > 1 km^{2} (0.386 sq mi or 247 acres) and river estuaries.

Le Soler (French pronunciation: [lə sɔle]; Catalan: El Soler) is a commune in the Pyrénées-Orientales department in southern France.

== Geography ==
Le Soler is located in the canton of La Vallée de la Têt and in the arrondissement of Perpignan.

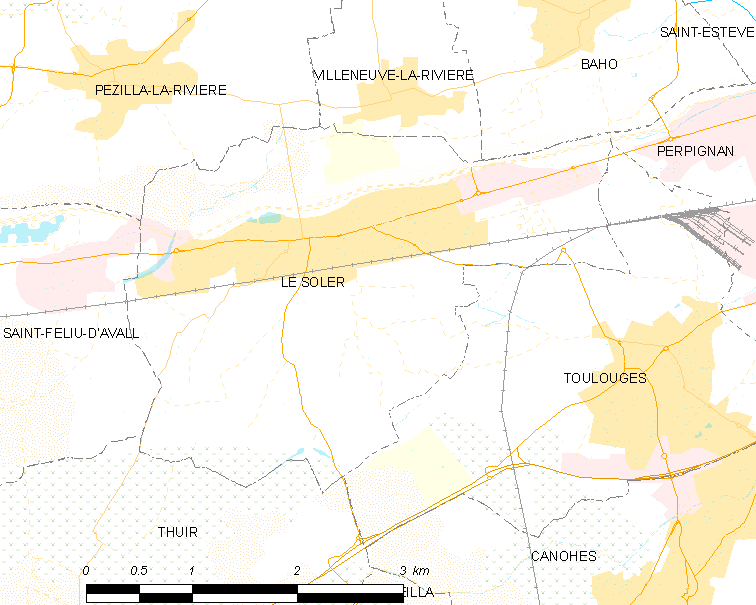
Map of Le Soler and its surrounding communes

== Population ==
Historical population
Year	Pop.	±% p.a.
1968	2,715	—
1975	3,340	+3.00%
1982	4,401	+4.02%
1990	5,147	+1.98%
1999	5,825	+1.38%
2007	6,630	+1.63%
2012	7,221	+1.72%
2017	7,710	+1.32%
2023	7,942	+0.50%
Source: INSEE

== See also ==
- Communes of the Pyrénées-Orientales department
