= Millas =

Millas Millars
- Commune
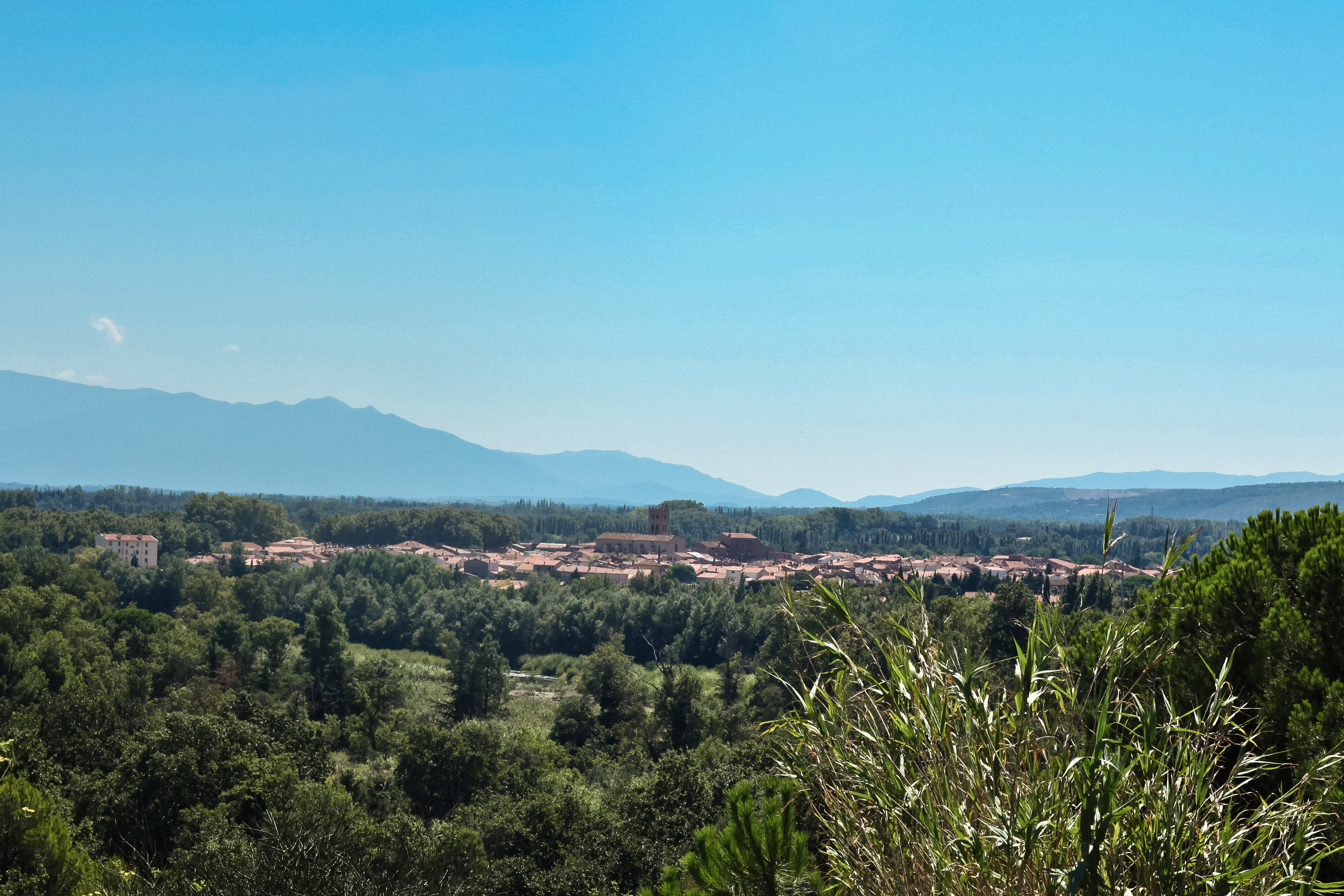
- A general view of Millas

- Coat of arms
- Location of Millas
- Location within France Location within Occitanie
- Coordinates: 42°41′33″N 2°41′47″E
- Country: France
- Region: Occitania
- Department: Pyrénées-Orientales
- Arrondissement: Prades
- Canton: La Vallée de la Têt
- Intercommunality: Roussillon Conflent

Government
  - Mayor (2020–2026): Jacques Garsau
- Area^{1}: 19.12 km^{2} (7.38 sq mi)
- Elevation: 102 m (335 ft)
- Highest elevation: 500 m (1,600 ft)
- Lowest elevation: 89 m (292 ft)
- Population (2023): 4,417
  - Density: 231.0/km^{2} (598.3/sq mi)
- Time zone: UTC+01:00 (CET)
  - Summer (DST): UTC+02:00 (CEST)
- INSEE/Postal code: 66108 /66170
- ^{1} French Land Register data, which excludes lakes, ponds, glaciers > 1 km^{2} (0.386 sq mi or 247 acres) and river estuaries.

Millas (French pronunciation: [mijas]; Catalan: Millars) is a commune in the Pyrénées-Orientales department in southern France.

== Geography ==
=== Localization ===
Millas is located in the canton of La Vallée de la Têt and in the arrondissement of Perpignan.

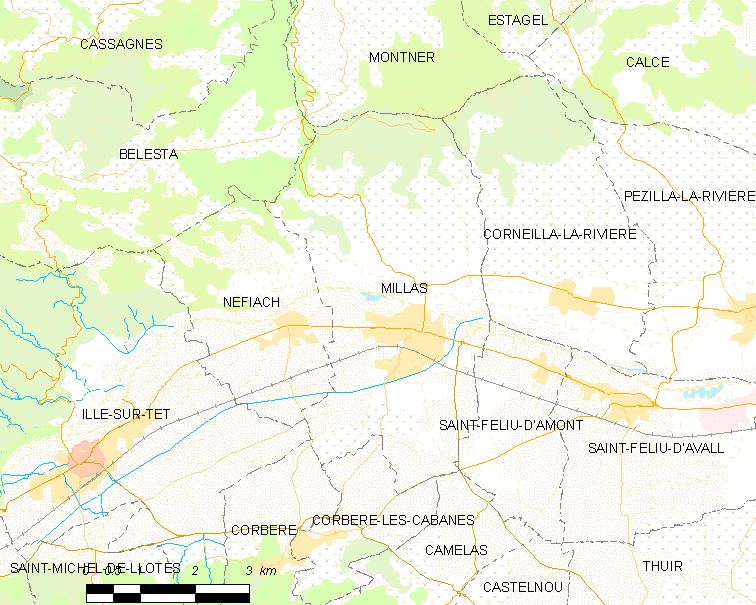
Map of Millas and its surrounding communes

=== Hydrography ===
The river Têt runs through Millas. Floods often occur, as in 1892 when the level of the Têt in Millas rose up to 4,20 meters.

== Demography ==
Historical population
Year	Pop.	±% p.a.
1968	2,489	—
1975	2,569	+0.45%
1982	2,824	+1.36%
1990	3,091	+1.14%
1999	3,452	+1.23%
2007	3,849	+1.37%
2012	4,012	+0.83%
2017	4,279	+1.30%
2023	4,417	+0.53%
Source: INSEE

== Notable residents ==
- Marine Le Pen and Louis Aliot, both politicians, live in Millas.

== Notable event ==
In December 2017, a school bus transporting children was split in two by a regional train running at 80 km/h as it passed over a level crossing in the village.

== See also ==
- Communes of the Pyrénées-Orientales department
