= Néfiach =

Néfiach Nefiac
- Commune
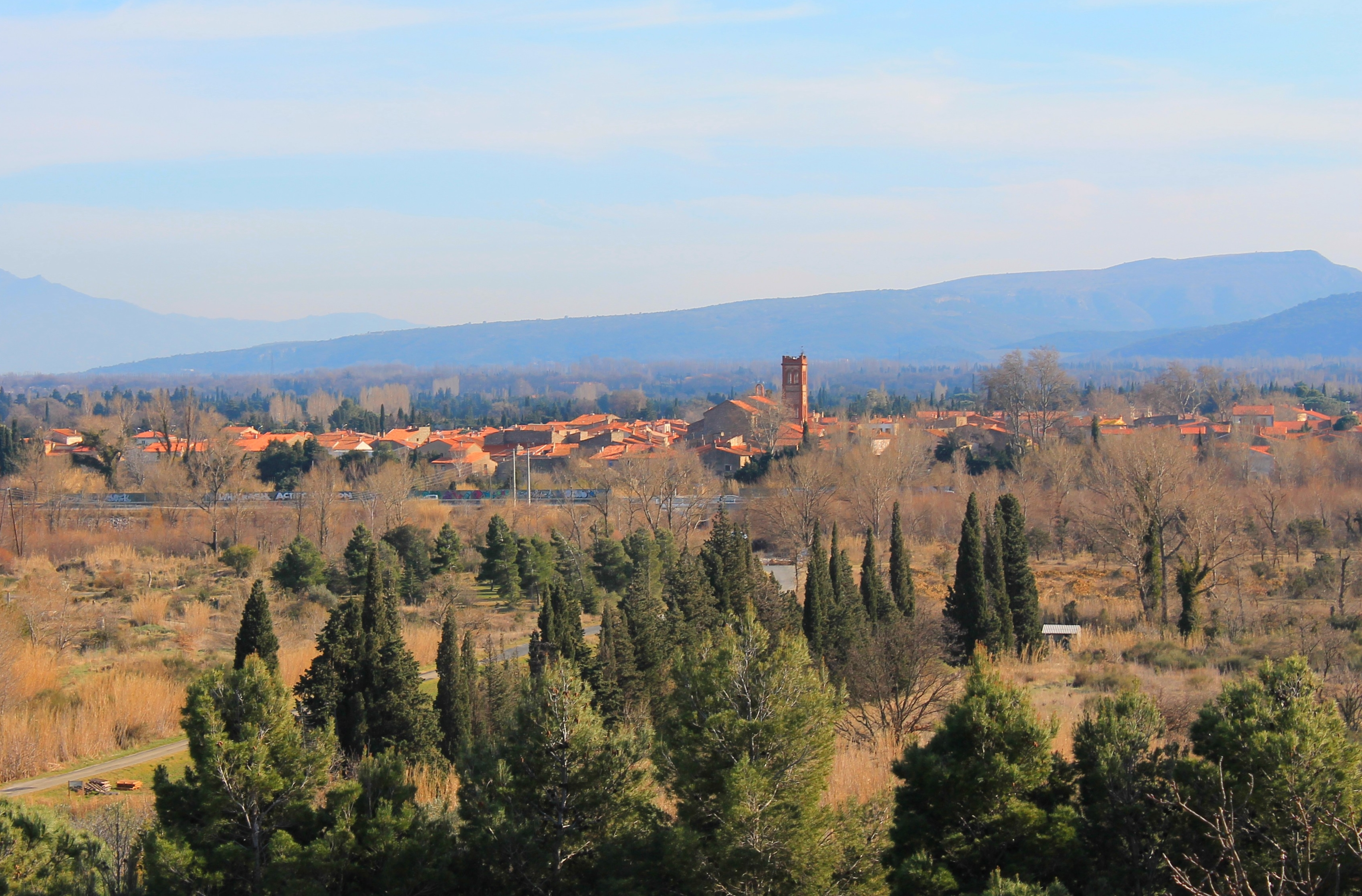
- A general view of Néfiach
- Location of Néfiach
- Location within France Location within Occitanie
- Coordinates: 42°41′41″N 2°40′04″E
- Country: France
- Region: Occitania
- Department: Pyrénées-Orientales
- Arrondissement: Prades
- Canton: La Vallée de la Têt
- Intercommunality: Roussillon Conflent

Government
  - Mayor (2020–2026): Patrice Vila
- Area^{1}: 8.81 km^{2} (3.40 sq mi)
- Highest elevation: 301 m (988 ft)
- Lowest elevation: 104 m (341 ft)
- Population (2023): 1,383
  - Density: 157/km^{2} (407/sq mi)
- Time zone: UTC+01:00 (CET)
  - Summer (DST): UTC+02:00 (CEST)
- INSEE/Postal code: 66121 /66170
- ^{1} French Land Register data, which excludes lakes, ponds, glaciers > 1 km^{2} (0.386 sq mi or 247 acres) and river estuaries.

Néfiach (French pronunciation: [nefjak]; Catalan: Nefiac) is a commune in the Pyrénées-Orientales department in southern France.

== Geography ==
Néfiach is located in the canton of La Vallée de la Têt and in the arrondissement of Perpignan.

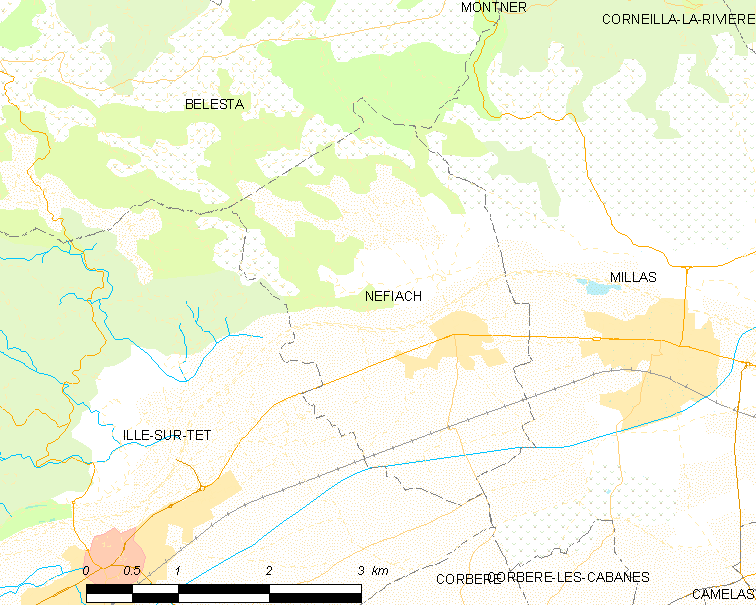
Map of Néfiach and its surrounding communes

== Population ==
Historical population
Year	Pop.	±% p.a.
1968	830	—
1975	746	−1.51%
1982	713	−0.64%
1990	835	+1.99%
1999	789	−0.63%
2007	992	+2.90%
2012	1,206	+3.98%
2017	1,280	+1.20%
2023	1,383	+1.30%
Source: INSEE

== See also ==
- Communes of the Pyrénées-Orientales department
