= Corbère =

Corbère Corbera del Castell
- Commune
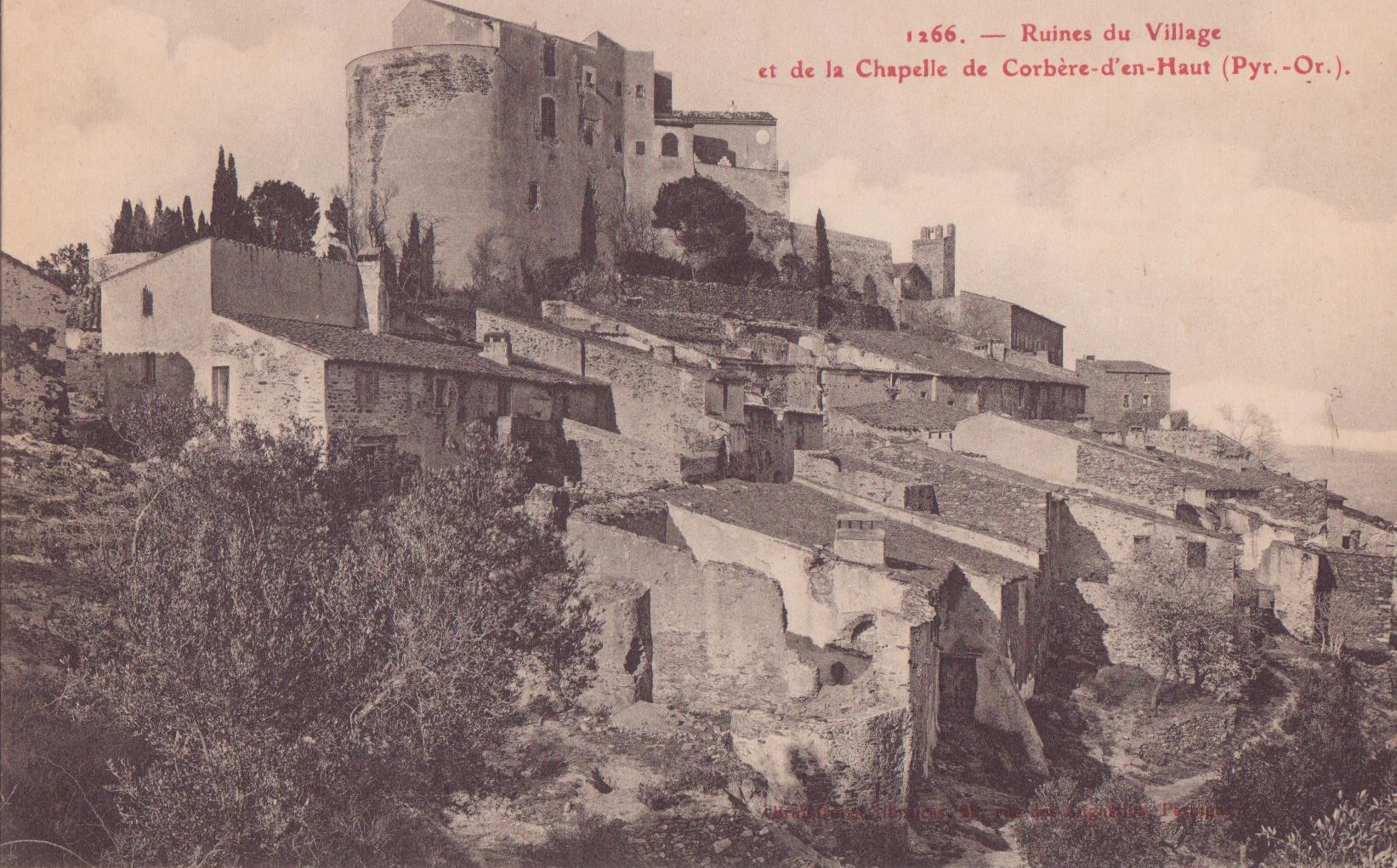
- Corbère-d'en-Haut in the early 20th century

- Coat of arms
- Location of Corbère
- Location within France Location within Occitanie
- Coordinates: 42°39′14″N 2°39′41″E
- Country: France
- Region: Occitania
- Department: Pyrénées-Orientales
- Arrondissement: Prades
- Canton: La Vallée de la Têt
- Intercommunality: Roussillon Conflent

Government
  - Mayor (2020–2026): Joseph Silvestre
- Area^{1}: 7.25 km^{2} (2.80 sq mi)
- Elevation: 160 m (520 ft)
- Highest elevation: 523 m (1,716 ft)
- Lowest elevation: 130 m (430 ft)
- Population (2023): 781
  - Density: 108/km^{2} (279/sq mi)
- Time zone: UTC+01:00 (CET)
  - Summer (DST): UTC+02:00 (CEST)
- INSEE/Postal code: 66055 /66130
- ^{1} French Land Register data, which excludes lakes, ponds, glaciers > 1 km^{2} (0.386 sq mi or 247 acres) and river estuaries.

Corbère (French pronunciation: [kɔʁbɛʁ]; Occitan: Corbèra; Catalan: Corbera) is a commune in the Pyrénées-Orientales department in southern France.

== Geography ==
=== Localisation ===
Corbère is located in the canton of La Vallée de la Têt and in the arrondissement of Perpignan.

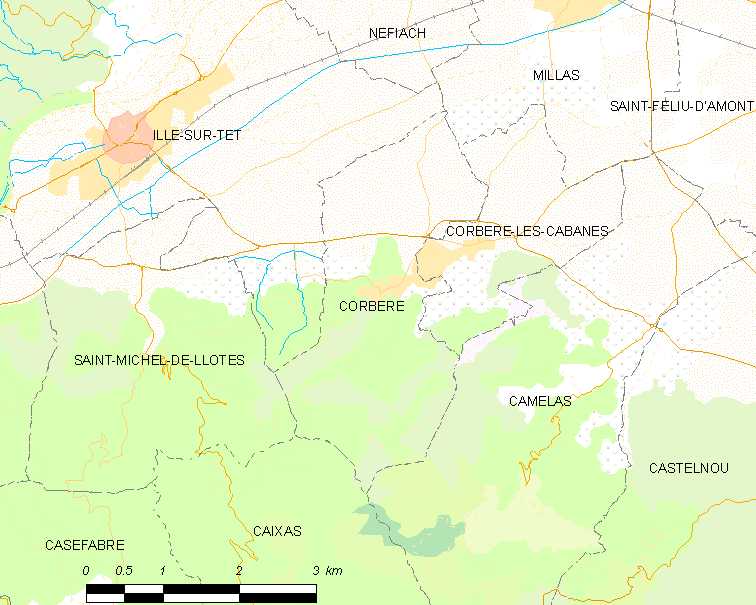
Map of Corbère and its surrounding communes

== History ==
The hamlet of Corbère started growing in population from the 16th century onwards, and was combined with the neighbouring territory of Corbère-les-Cabanes. However, in the 19th century, the neighbouring population of Corbère-les-Cabanes believed that it was now big enough to be its own separate commune, and on May 14, 1856, Corbère and Corbère-les-Cabanes split.

== Population ==
Historical population
Year	Pop.	±% p.a.
1968	471	—
1975	421	−1.59%
1982	420	−0.03%
1990	442	+0.64%
1999	543	+2.31%
2007	603	+1.32%
2012	717	+3.52%
2017	733	+0.44%
2023	781	+1.06%
Source: INSEE

== See also ==
- Communes of the Pyrénées-Orientales department
- France
