= Corbère-les-Cabanes =

Corbère-les-Cabanes Corbera de les Cabanes
- Commune
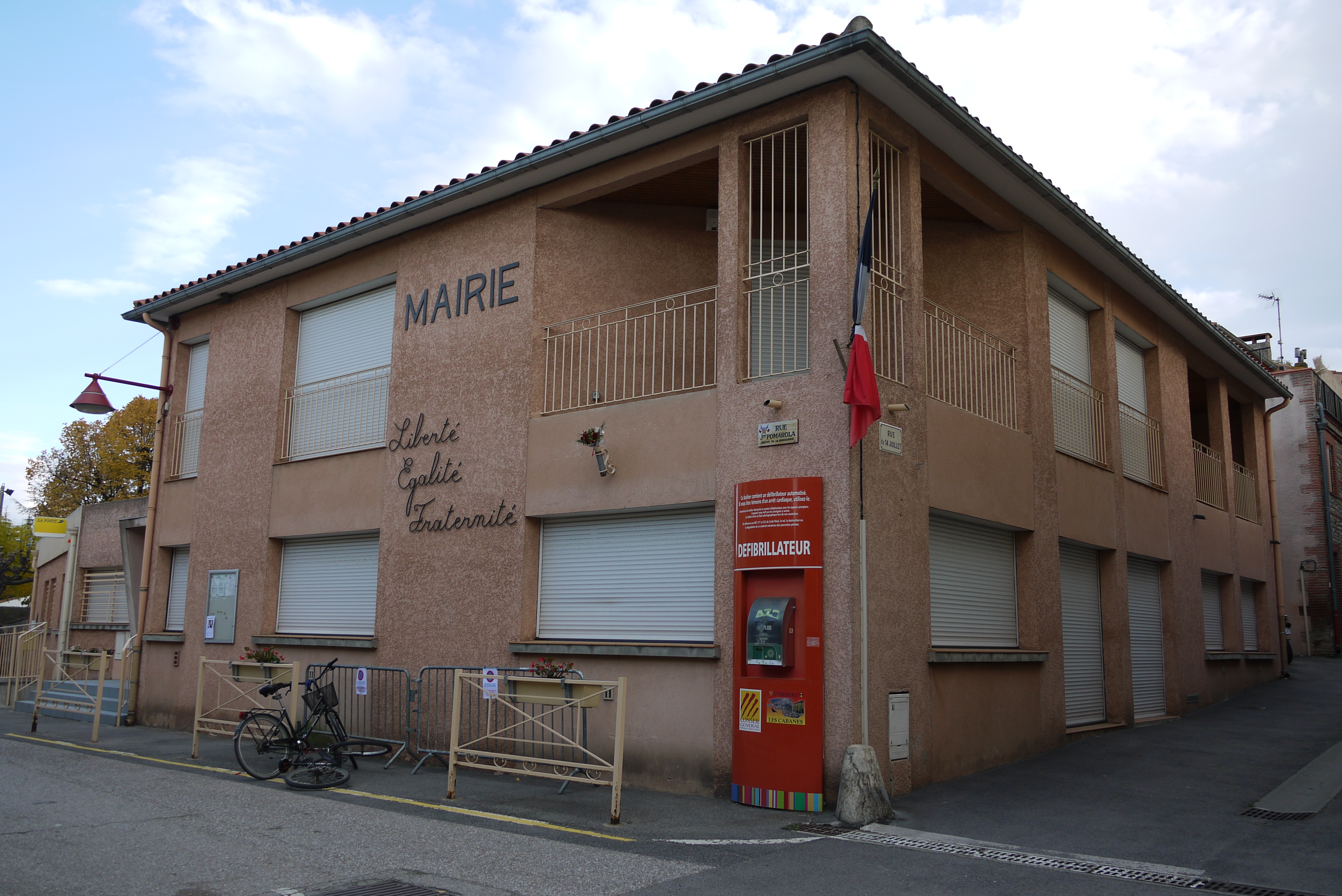
- The town hall in Corbère-les-Cabanes
- Location of Corbère-les-Cabanes
- Location within France Location within Occitanie
- Coordinates: 42°39′33″N 2°40′36″E
- Country: France
- Region: Occitania
- Department: Pyrénées-Orientales
- Arrondissement: Prades
- Canton: La Vallée de la Têt
- Intercommunality: Roussillon Conflent

Government
  - Mayor (2020–2026): Gérard Soler
- Area^{1}: 4.14 km^{2} (1.60 sq mi)
- Elevation: 150 m (490 ft)
- Highest elevation: 300 m (980 ft)
- Lowest elevation: 125 m (410 ft)
- Population (2023): 1,213
  - Density: 293/km^{2} (759/sq mi)
- Time zone: UTC+01:00 (CET)
  - Summer (DST): UTC+02:00 (CEST)
- INSEE/Postal code: 66056 /66130
- ^{1} French Land Register data, which excludes lakes, ponds, glaciers > 1 km^{2} (0.386 sq mi or 247 acres) and river estuaries.

Corbère-les-Cabanes (French pronunciation: [kɔʁbɛʁ le kaban]; Catalan: Corbera de les Cabanes) is a commune in the Pyrénées-Orientales department in southern France.

== Geography ==
=== Localisation ===
Corbère-les-Cabanes is located in the canton of La Vallée de la Têt and in the arrondissement of Perpignan.

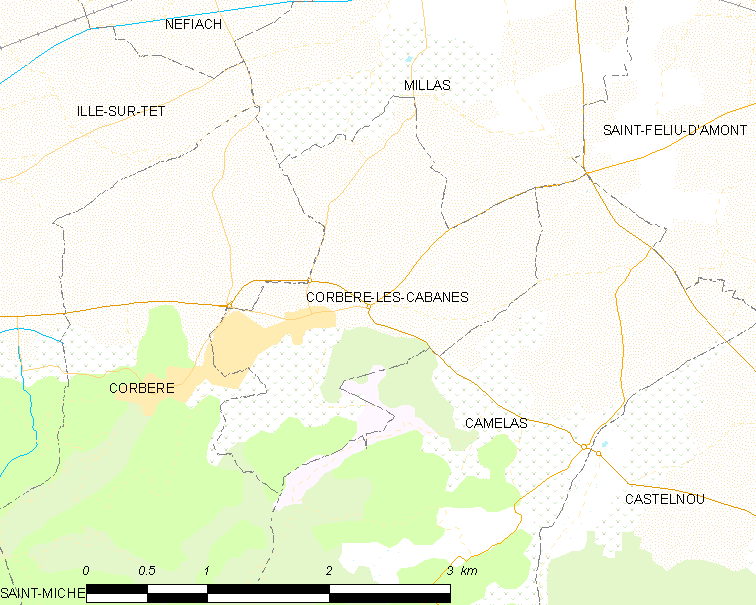
Map of Corbère-les-Cabanes and its surrounding communes

== History ==
The hamlet of Corbère-les-Cabanes starts growing in population from the 16th century and on. In the 19th century, the territory was still part of the commune of Corbère. However, believing it was big enough, the population asked to become an independent commune from Corbère. This was completed on May 14, 1856.

== Population ==
Historical population
Year	Pop.	±% p.a.
1968	557	—
1975	500	−1.53%
1982	535	+0.97%
1990	663	+2.72%
1999	844	+2.72%
2007	966	+1.70%
2012	1,125	+3.09%
2017	1,070	−1.00%
2023	1,213	+2.11%
Source: INSEE

== See also ==
- Communes of the Pyrénées-Orientales department
