= Sournia =

Sournia Sornià Sornhan
- Commune
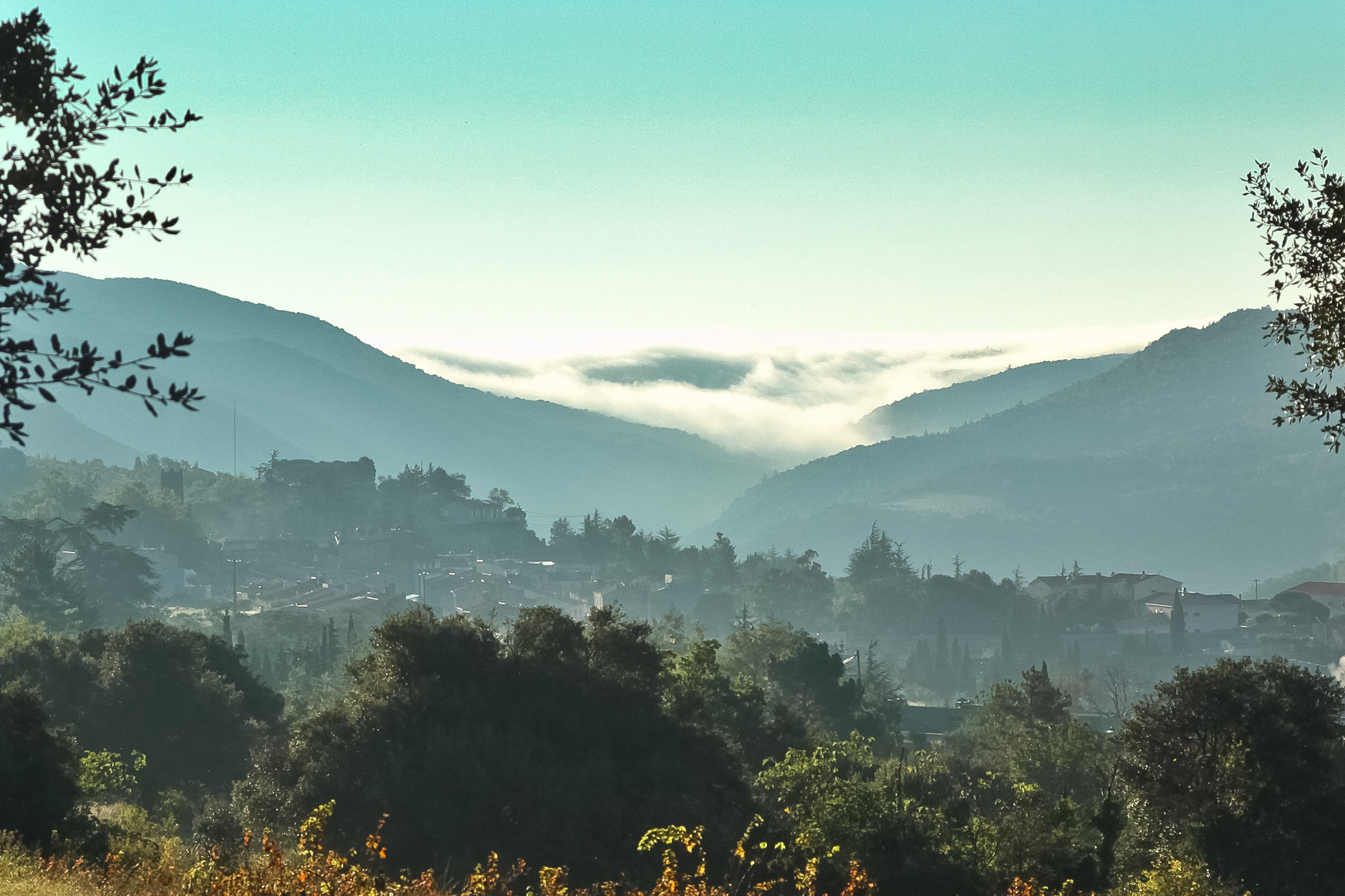
- A general view of Sournia

- Coat of arms
- Location of Sournia
- Location within France Location within Occitanie
- Coordinates: 42°43′43″N 2°26′34″E
- Country: France
- Region: Occitania
- Department: Pyrénées-Orientales
- Arrondissement: Prades
- Canton: La Vallée de l'Agly

Government
  - Mayor (2020–2026): Yvon Crambes
- Area^{1}: 29.99 km^{2} (11.58 sq mi)
- Elevation: 500 m (1,600 ft)
- Highest elevation: 1,234 m (4,049 ft)
- Lowest elevation: 380 m (1,250 ft)
- Population (2023): 478
  - Density: 15.9/km^{2} (41.3/sq mi)
- Time zone: UTC+01:00 (CET)
  - Summer (DST): UTC+02:00 (CEST)
- INSEE/Postal code: 66198 /66730
- ^{1} French Land Register data, which excludes lakes, ponds, glaciers > 1 km^{2} (0.386 sq mi or 247 acres) and river estuaries.

Sournia (French pronunciation: [suʁnja]; Catalan: Sornià; Occitan: Sornhan) is a commune in the Pyrénées-Orientales department in the Occitanie region of south-western France. Its inhabitants are known as Sourniannais.

== Geography ==
Sournia is a town of the Fenouillèdes, the languedocienne part of the Pyrénées-Orientales, in the canton of La Vallée de l'Agly and in the arrondissement of Prades. The river Désix runs through the village. Sournia is 22 km from Ille-sur-Têt and from Vinça, 24 km from Prades and from Saint-Paul-de-Fenouillet, 30 km from Latour-de-France and 34 km from Axat.
The commune is covered by the quality wine standard AOC 'Côtes-du-Roussillon'.
Sournia is crossed by the long-distance footpath, GR 36.

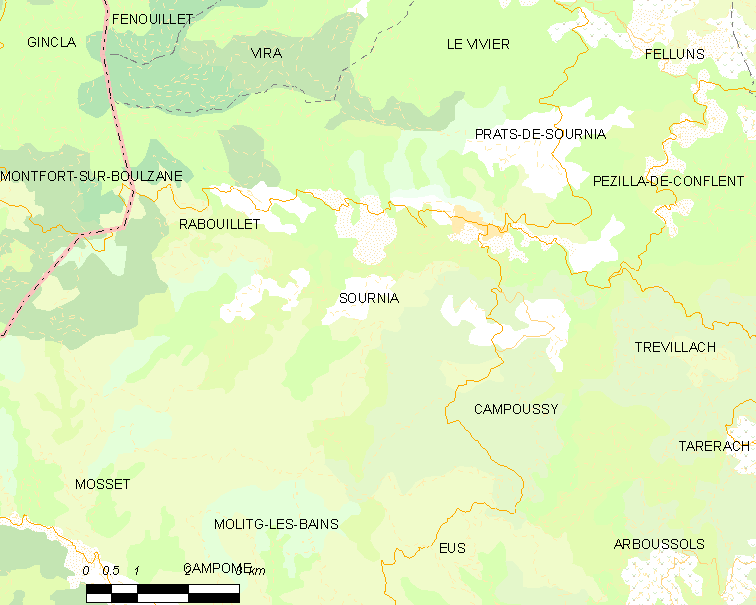
Map of Sournia and its surrounding communes

== Administration ==
The current mayor of Sournia is Paul Blanc, a senator, of the centre-right and right wing party UMP founded by Jacques Chirac.

== Population ==
For some reason at the end of the 19th century, the population of Sournia seemed to have a reputation for having one of the longest longevity in France, even though this fact was not clearly verified.

Historical population

Year	Pop.	±% p.a.
1793	761	—
1800	814	+0.97%
1806	812	−0.04%
1821	882	+0.55%
1831	929	+0.52%
1836	957	+0.60%
1841	933	−0.51%
1846	945	+0.26%
1851	1,073	+2.57%
1856	1,006	−1.28%
1861	950	−1.14%
1866	921	−0.62%
1872	885	−0.66%
1876	850	−1.00%
1881	765	−2.09%
1886	725	−1.07%
1891	686	−1.10%
1896	634	−1.56%
1901	604	−0.96%

Year	Pop.	±% p.a.
1906	604	+0.00%
1911	583	−0.71%
1921	463	−2.28%
1926	410	−2.40%
1931	424	+0.67%
1936	389	−1.71%
1946	382	−0.18%
1954	347	−1.19%
1962	351	+0.14%
1968	339	−0.58%
1975	296	−1.92%
1982	339	+1.96%
1990	376	+1.30%
1999	367	−0.27%
2007	419	+1.67%
2012	494	+3.35%
2017	498	+0.16%
2023	478	−0.68%

Source: EHESS and INSEE (1968–2023)

== Places of interest ==
- Ruins of the former church of Saint-Michel from the tenth century.
- The ancient church of Sainte-Félicité from the tenth and eleventh centuries.
- Church of Arsa from the twelfth century.
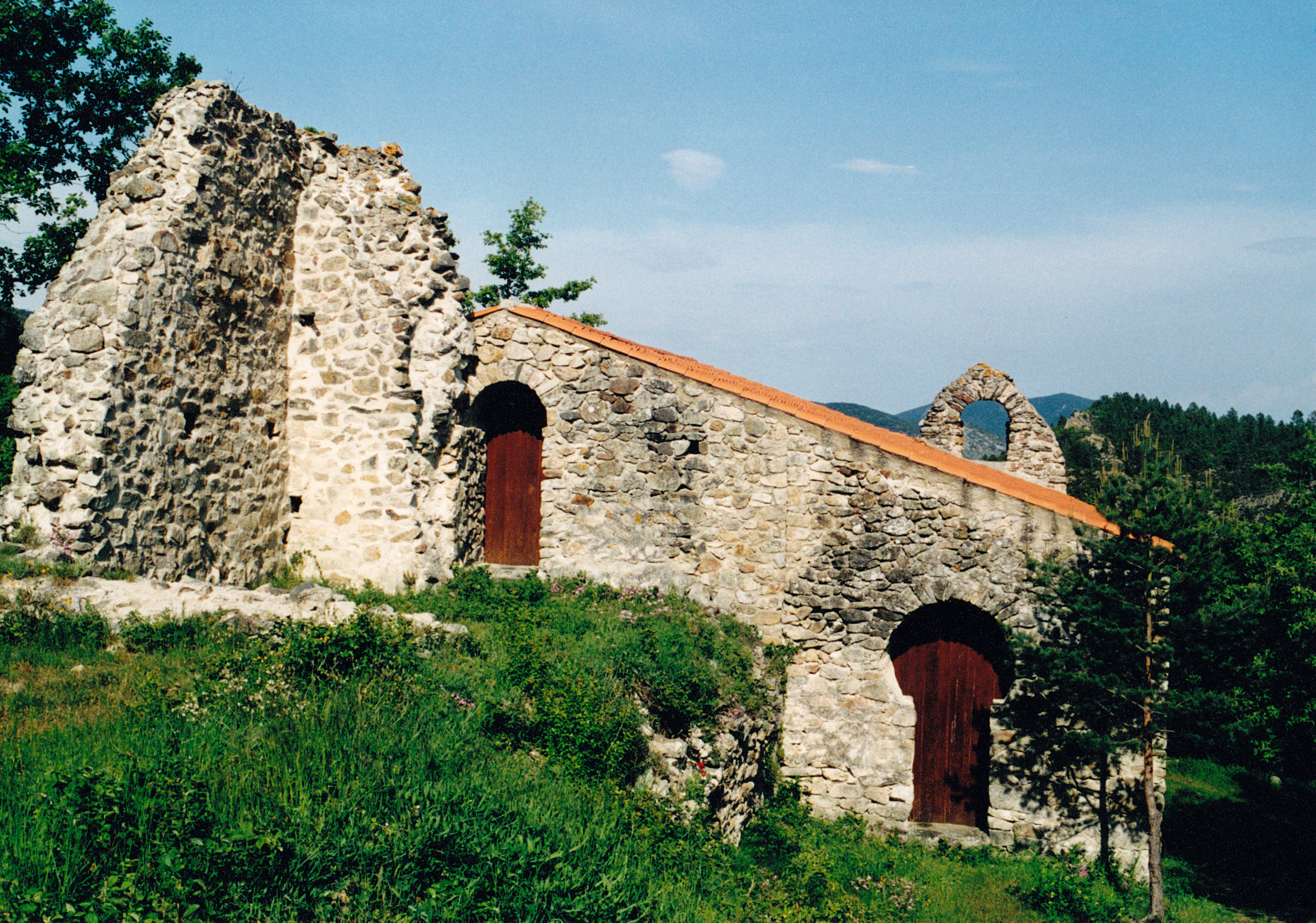
Saint-Michel

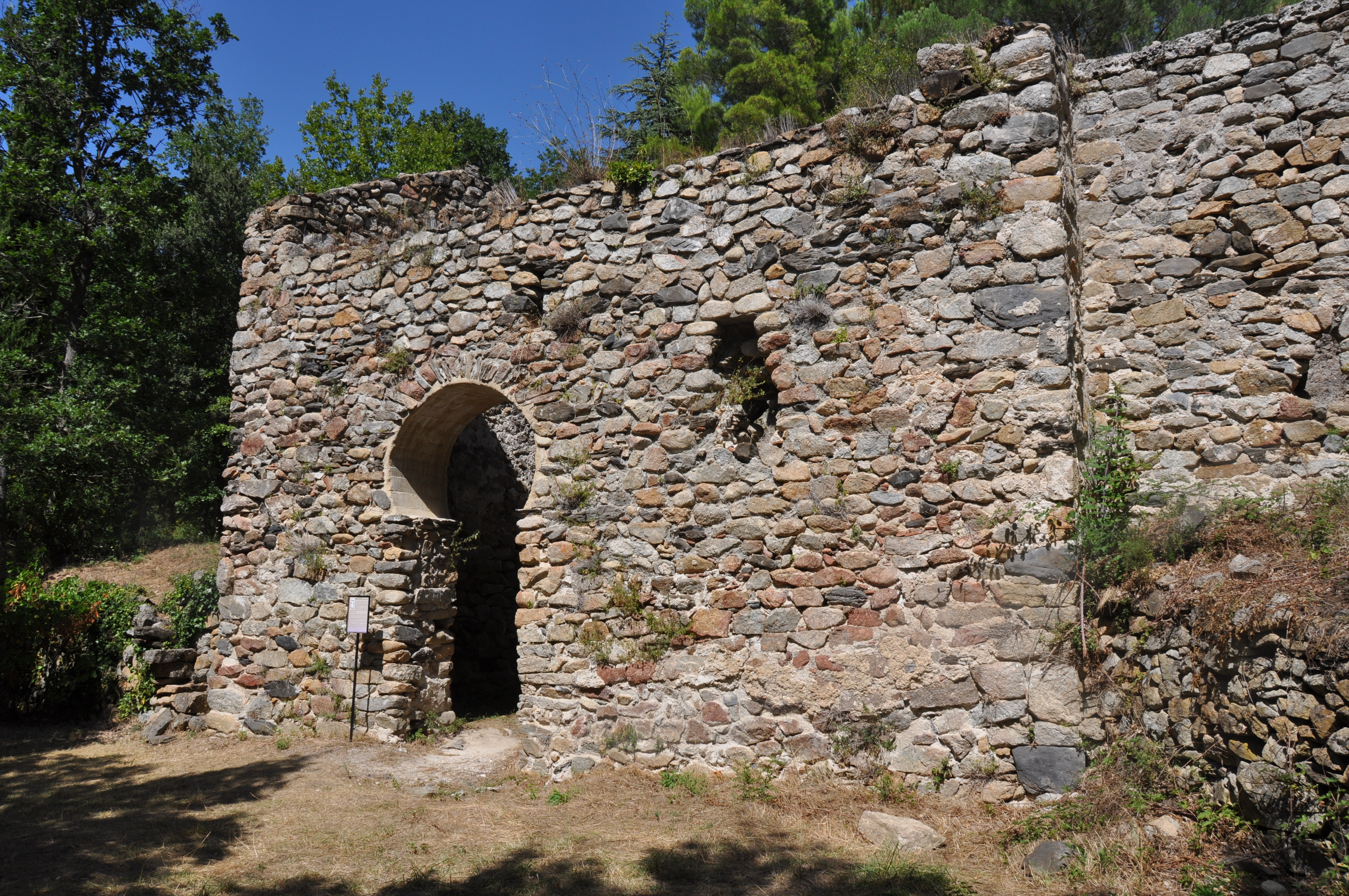
Sainte-Félicité

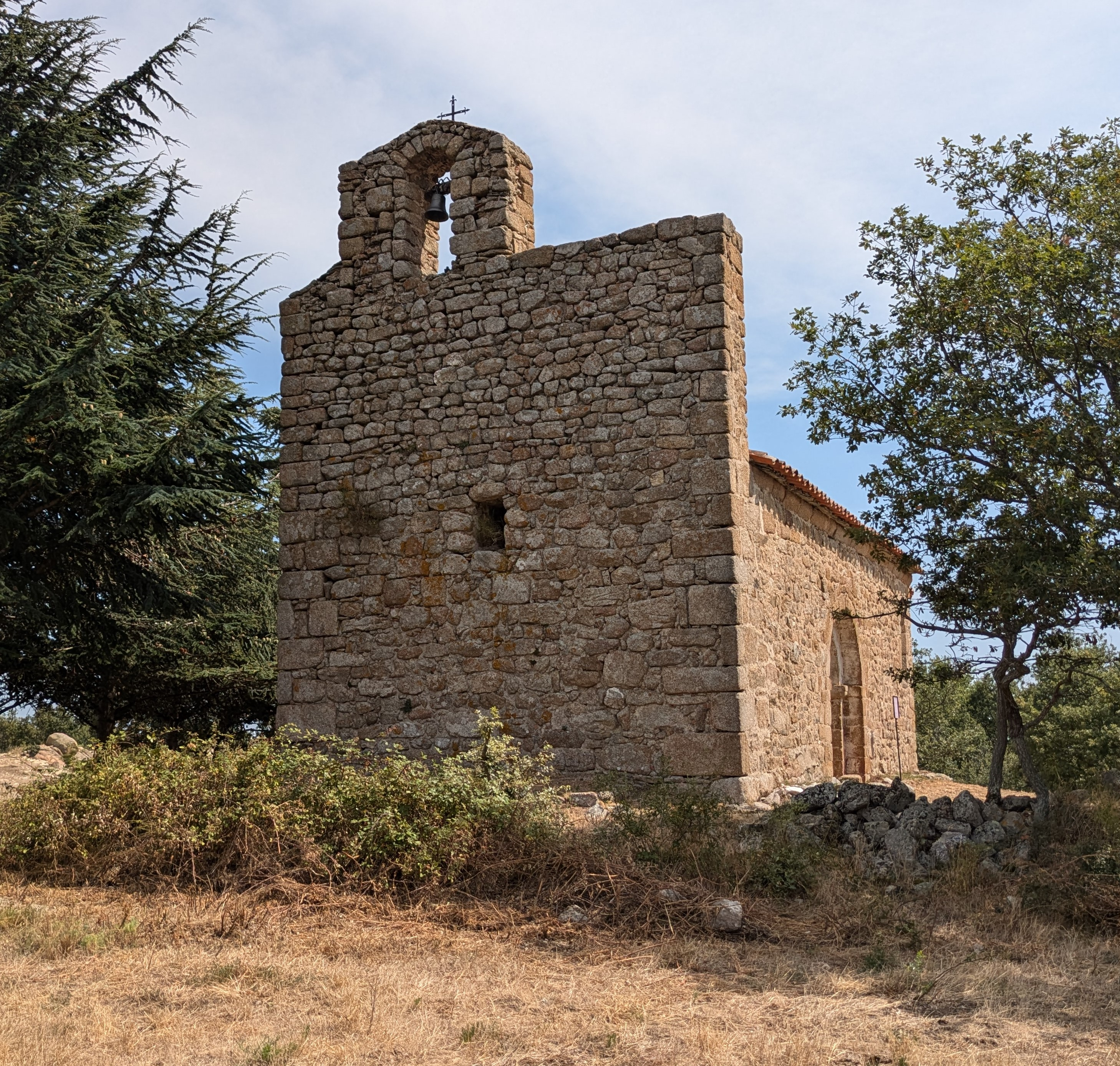
Saint-Laurent d'Arsa

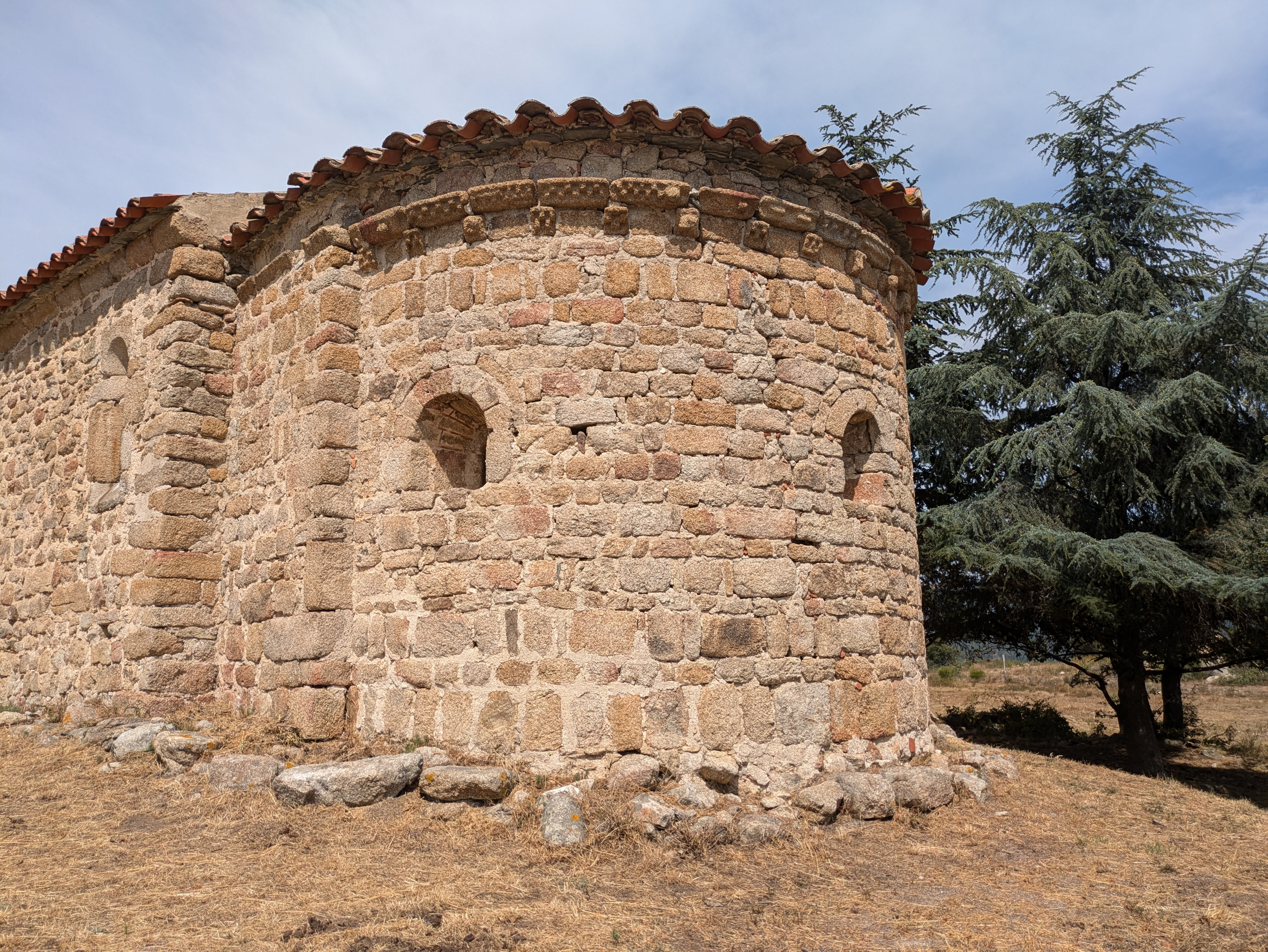
The apse, Saint-Laurent d'Arsa

== See also ==
- Communes of the Pyrénées-Orientales department
