= Montalba-le-Château =

Montalba-le-Château Montalban del Castèlh (Occitan)
- Commune
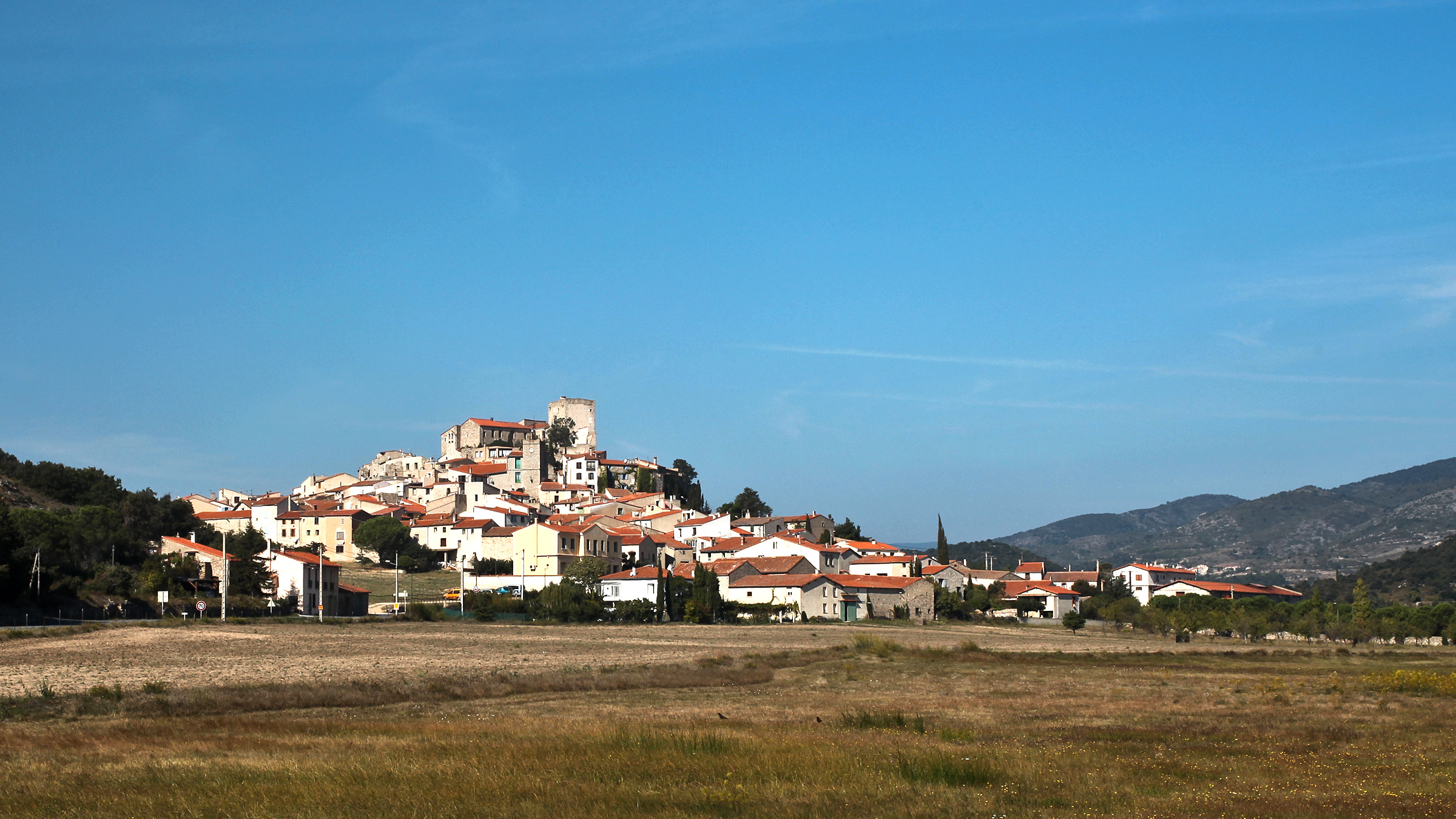
- A general view of Montalba-le-Château

- Coat of arms
- Location of Montalba-le-Château
- Location within France Location within Occitanie
- Coordinates: 42°41′48″N 2°33′38″E
- Country: France
- Region: Occitania
- Department: Pyrénées-Orientales
- Arrondissement: Prades
- Canton: La Vallée de la Têt
- Intercommunality: Roussillon Conflent

Government
  - Mayor (2020–2026): Marie Martinez
- Area^{1}: 15.9 km^{2} (6.1 sq mi)
- Elevation: 430 m (1,410 ft)
- Highest elevation: 661 m (2,169 ft)
- Lowest elevation: 280 m (920 ft)
- Population (2023): 163
  - Density: 10.3/km^{2} (26.6/sq mi)
- Time zone: UTC+01:00 (CET)
  - Summer (DST): UTC+02:00 (CEST)
- INSEE/Postal code: 66111 /66130
- ^{1} French Land Register data, which excludes lakes, ponds, glaciers > 1 km^{2} (0.386 sq mi or 247 acres) and river estuaries.

Montalba-le-Château (French: [mɔ̃talba l(ə) ʃɑto]; Occitan: Montalban del Castèlh; Catalan: Montalbà del Castell) is a commune in the Pyrénées-Orientales department in southern France.

== Geography ==
=== Localisation ===
Montalba-le-Château is located in the canton of La Vallée de la Têt and in the arrondissement of Prades.

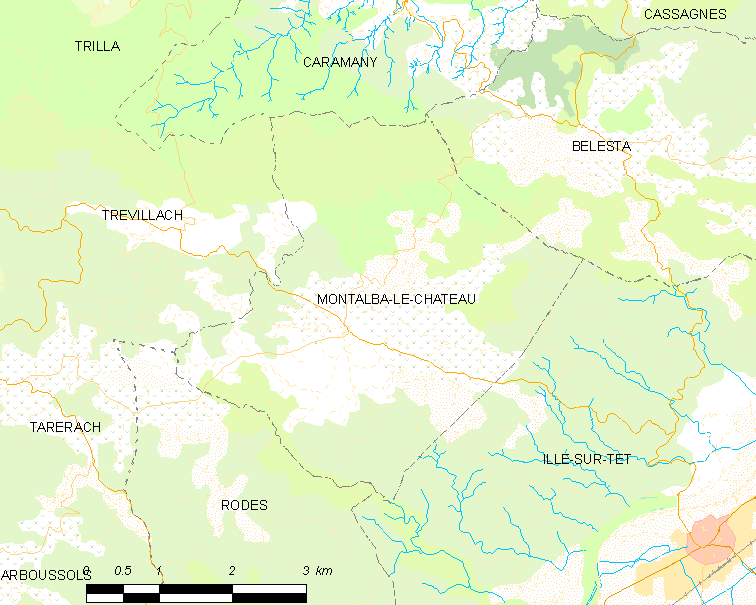
Map of Montalba-le-Château and its surrounding communes

== Population ==
Historical population
| Year | Pop. | ±% p.a. |
|---|---|---|
| 1968 | 203 | — |
| 1975 | 156 | −3.69% |
| 1982 | 121 | −3.56% |
| 1990 | 111 | −1.07% |
| 1999 | 120 | +0.87% |
| 2007 | 142 | +2.13% |
| 2012 | 148 | +0.83% |
| 2017 | 149 | +0.13% |
| 2023 | 163 | +1.51% |
Source: INSEE

== See also ==
- Communes of the Pyrénées-Orientales department
