= Corneilla-la-Rivière =

Corneilla-la-Rivière Cornellà de la Ribera
- Commune
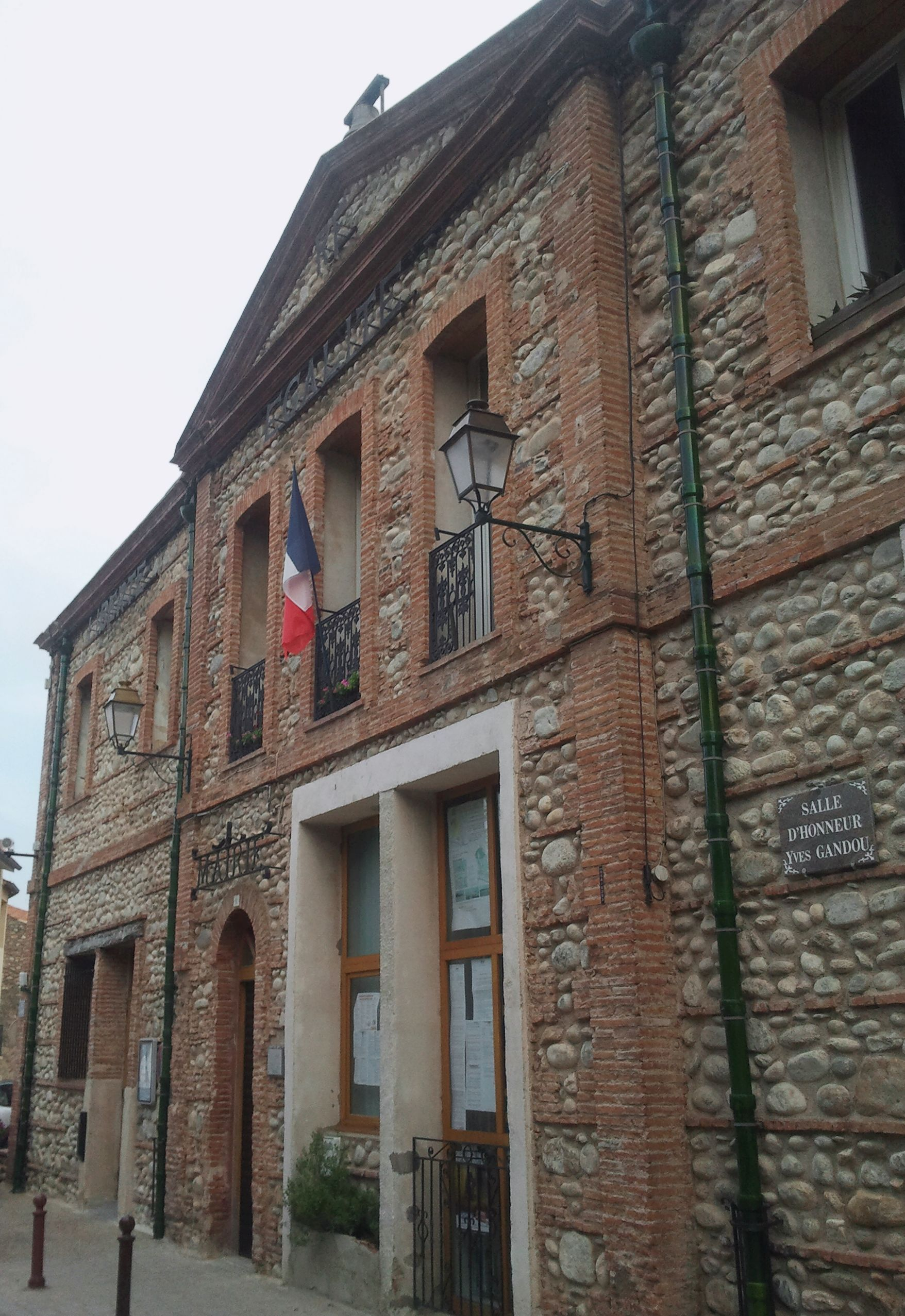
- The town hall

- Coat of arms
- Location of Corneilla-la-Rivière
- Location within France Location within Occitanie
- Coordinates: 42°41′54″N 2°43′52″E
- Country: France
- Region: Occitania
- Department: Pyrénées-Orientales
- Arrondissement: Prades
- Canton: La Vallée de la Têt
- Intercommunality: Perpignan Méditerranée Métropole

Government
  - Mayor (2020–2026): René Laville
- Area^{1}: 11.90 km^{2} (4.59 sq mi)
- Elevation: 48 m (157 ft)
- Highest elevation: 480 m (1,570 ft)
- Lowest elevation: 74 m (243 ft)
- Population (2023): 2,004
  - Density: 168.4/km^{2} (436.2/sq mi)
- Time zone: UTC+01:00 (CET)
  - Summer (DST): UTC+02:00 (CEST)
- INSEE/Postal code: 66058 /66550
- ^{1} French Land Register data, which excludes lakes, ponds, glaciers > 1 km^{2} (0.386 sq mi or 247 acres) and river estuaries.

Corneilla-la-Rivière (French pronunciation: [kɔʁnɛja la ʁivjɛʁ]; Catalan: Cornellà de la Ribera) is a commune in the Pyrénées-Orientales department in southern France.

== Geography ==
=== Localisation ===
Corneilla-la-Rivière is located in the canton of La Vallée de la Têt and in the arrondissement of Perpignan.

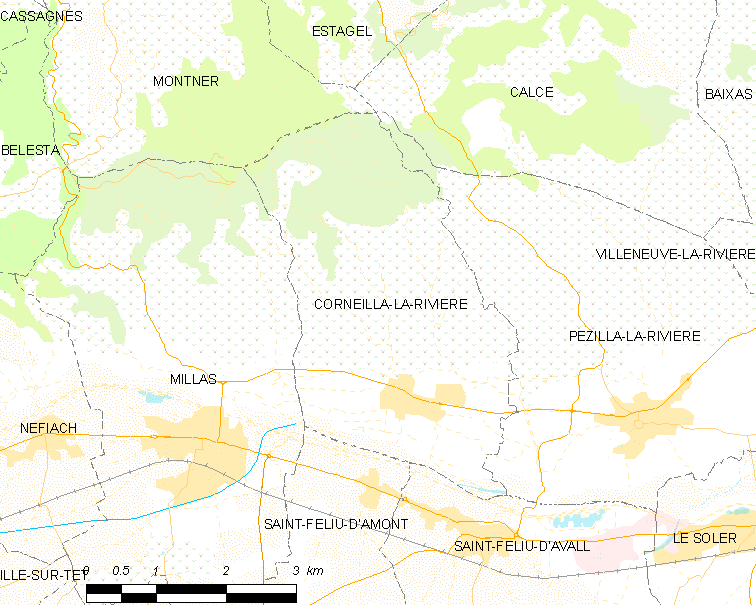
Map of Corneilla-la-Rivière and its surrounding communes

== Population ==
Historical population
Year	Pop.	±% p.a.
1968	1,010	—
1975	936	−1.08%
1982	967	+0.47%
1990	1,081	+1.40%
1999	1,407	+2.97%
2007	1,725	+2.58%
2012	1,953	+2.51%
2017	1,991	+0.39%
2023	2,004	+0.11%
Source: INSEE

== See also ==
- Communes of the Pyrénées-Orientales department
