= Saint-Féliu-d'Avall =

Saint-Féliu-d'Avall Sant Feliu d'Avall
- Commune
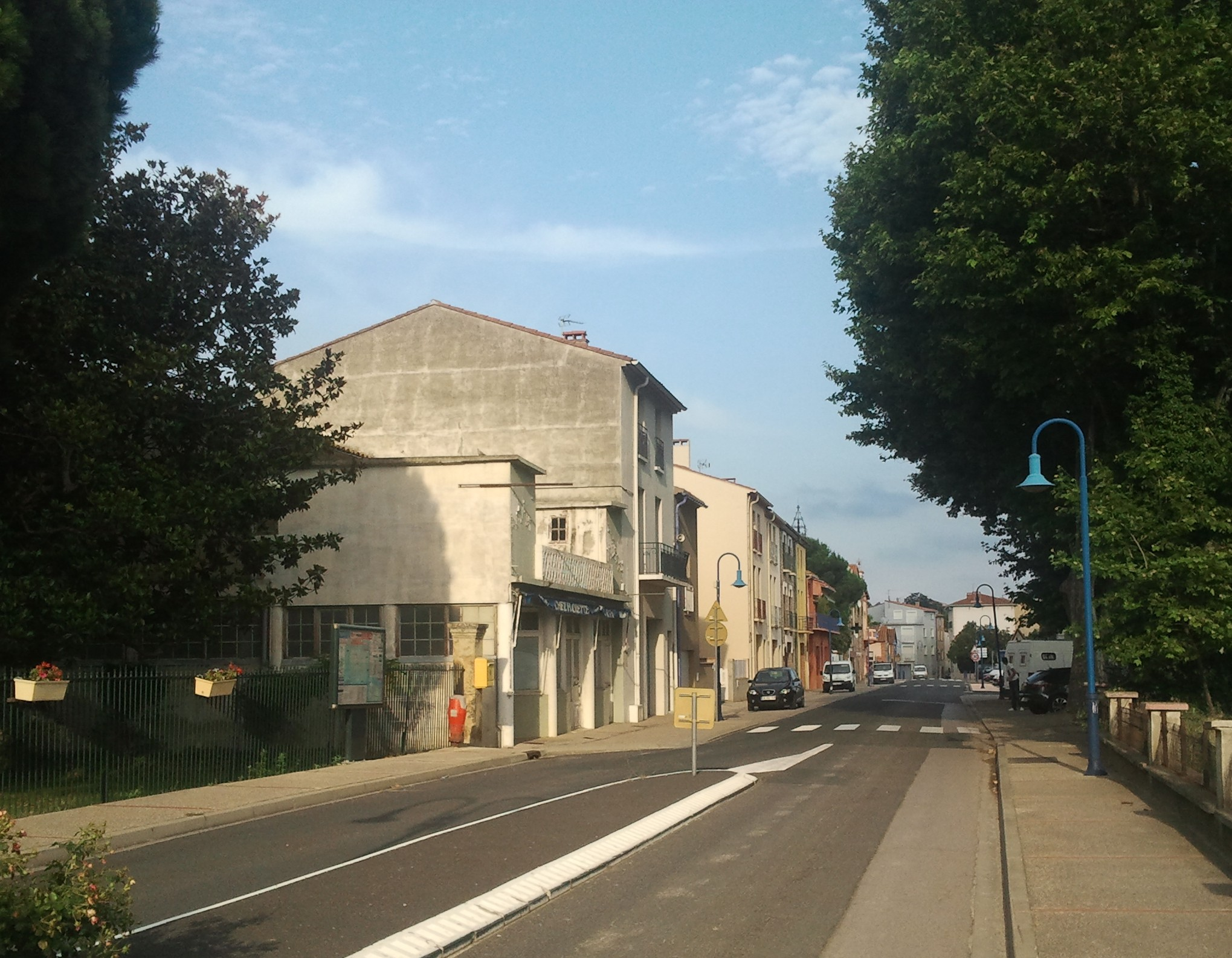
- The main street in Saint-Féliu-d'Avall

- Coat of arms
- Location of Saint-Féliu-d'Avall
- Location within France Location within Occitanie
- Coordinates: 42°40′57″N 2°44′21″E
- Country: France
- Region: Occitania
- Department: Pyrénées-Orientales
- Arrondissement: Perpignan
- Canton: La Vallée de la Têt
- Intercommunality: Perpignan Méditerranée Métropole

Government
  - Mayor (2020–2026): Roger Garrido
- Area^{1}: 10.79 km^{2} (4.17 sq mi)
- Elevation: 87 m (285 ft)
- Highest elevation: 114 m (374 ft)
- Lowest elevation: 63 m (207 ft)
- Population (2023): 2,950
  - Density: 273/km^{2} (708/sq mi)
- Time zone: UTC+01:00 (CET)
  - Summer (DST): UTC+02:00 (CEST)
- INSEE/Postal code: 66174 /66170
- ^{1} French Land Register data, which excludes lakes, ponds, glaciers > 1 km^{2} (0.386 sq mi or 247 acres) and river estuaries.

Saint-Féliu-d'Avall (French pronunciation: [sɛ̃ feljy davaj]; Catalan: Sant Feliu d'Avall) is a commune in the Pyrénées-Orientales department in southern France.

== Geography ==
Saint-Féliu-d'Avall is located in the canton of La Vallée de la Têt and in the arrondissement of Perpignan.

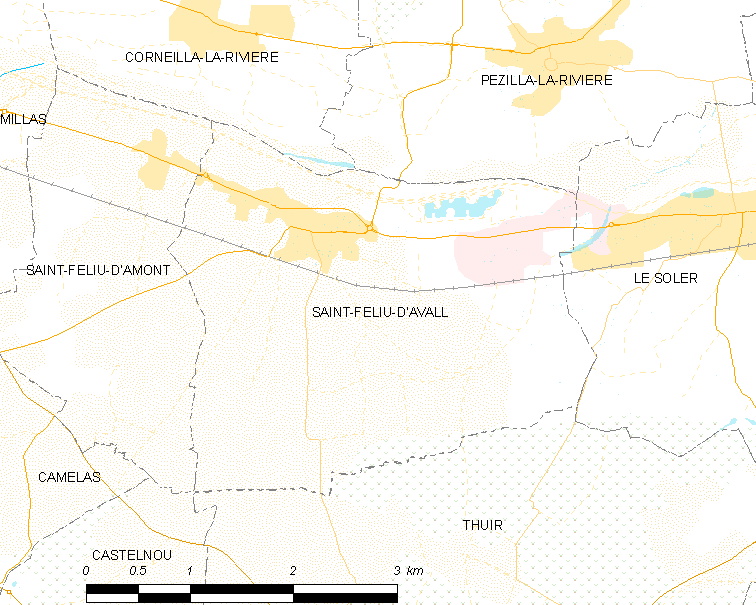
Map of Saint-Féliu-d'Avall and its surrounding communes

== Population ==
Historical population
Year	Pop.	±% p.a.
1968	1,533	—
1975	1,461	−0.68%
1982	1,792	+2.96%
1990	1,956	+1.10%
1999	2,160	+1.11%
2007	2,396	+1.30%
2012	2,539	+1.17%
2017	2,797	+1.95%
2023	2,950	+0.89%
Source: INSEE

== See also ==
- Communes of the Pyrénées-Orientales department
