= Saint-Féliu-d'Amont =

Saint-Féliu d'Amont Sant Feliu d'Amunt
- Commune
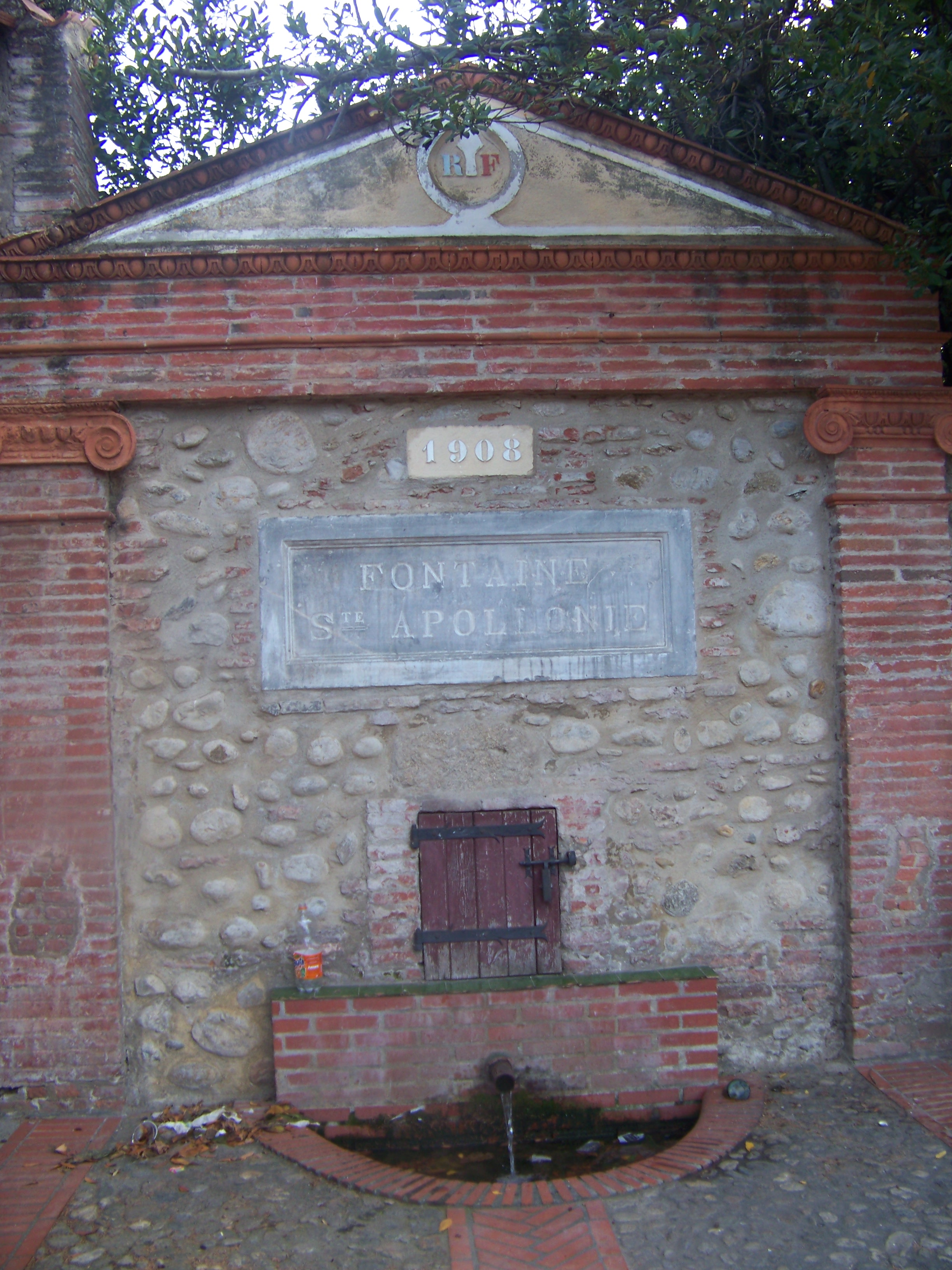
- The fountain of Sainte-Apollonie, in Saint-Féliu-d'Amont

- Coat of arms
- Location of Saint-Féliu d'Amont
- Location within France Location within Occitanie
- Coordinates: 42°41′14″N 2°43′23″E
- Country: France
- Region: Occitania
- Department: Pyrénées-Orientales
- Arrondissement: Prades
- Canton: La Vallée de la Têt
- Intercommunality: Roussillon Conflent

Government
  - Mayor (2020–2026): Robert Olive
- Area^{1}: 6.11 km^{2} (2.36 sq mi)
- Elevation: 82 m (269 ft)
- Highest elevation: 124 m (407 ft)
- Lowest elevation: 82 m (269 ft)
- Population (2023): 1,292
  - Density: 211/km^{2} (548/sq mi)
- Time zone: UTC+01:00 (CET)
  - Summer (DST): UTC+02:00 (CEST)
- INSEE/Postal code: 66173 /66170
- Website: saintfeliudamont.fr
- ^{1} French Land Register data, which excludes lakes, ponds, glaciers > 1 km^{2} (0.386 sq mi or 247 acres) and river estuaries.

Saint-Féliu-d'Amont (French pronunciation: [sɛ̃ feljy damɔ̃]; Catalan: Sant Feliu d'Amunt) is a commune in the Pyrénées-Orientales department in southern France.

== Geography ==
Saint-Féliu-d'Amont is in the canton of La Vallée de la Têt and in the arrondissement of Perpignan.

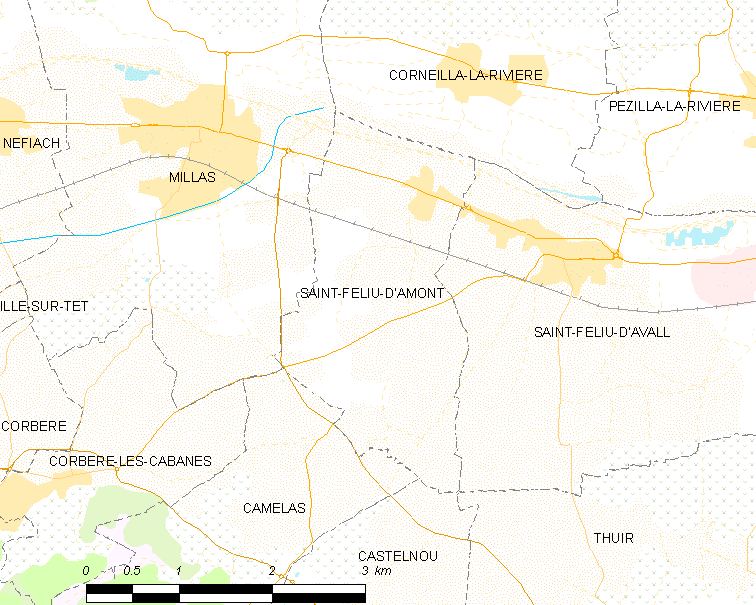
Map of Saint-Féliu-d'Amont and its surrounding communes

== Population ==
Historical population
Year	Pop.	±% p.a.
1968	474	—
1975	413	−1.95%
1982	502	+2.83%
1990	556	+1.29%
1999	654	+1.82%
2007	727	+1.33%
2012	905	+4.48%
2017	1,133	+4.60%
2023	1,292	+2.21%
Source: INSEE

== Notable people ==
- Christian Bourquin (1954-) : politician born in Saint-Féliu-d'Amont.

== See also ==
- Communes of the Pyrénées-Orientales department
