= La Grande-Motte =

- Commune
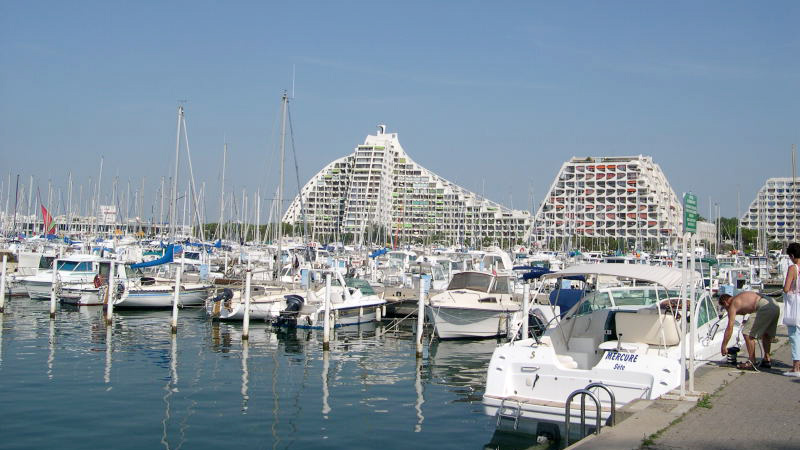
- The marina of La Grande-Motte and the grande pyramide
- Location of La Grande-Motte
- Location within France Location within Occitanie
- Coordinates: 43°33′41″N 4°05′09″E
- Country: France
- Region: Occitania
- Department: Hérault
- Arrondissement: Montpellier
- Canton: Mauguio
- Intercommunality: CA Pays de l'Or

Government
  - Mayor (2020–2026): Stéphan Rossignol
- Area^{1}: 10.58 km^{2} (4.08 sq mi)
- Elevation: 3 m (9.8 ft)
- Highest elevation: 3 m (9.8 ft)
- Lowest elevation: 0 m (0 ft)
- Population (2023): 8,440
  - Density: 798/km^{2} (2,070/sq mi)
- Demonym(s): Grand Mottois (masculine); Grand Mottoise (feminine)
- Time zone: UTC+01:00 (CET)
  - Summer (DST): UTC+02:00 (CEST)
- INSEE/Postal code: 34344 /34280
- ^{1} French Land Register data, which excludes lakes, ponds, glaciers > 1 km^{2} (0.386 sq mi or 247 acres) and river estuaries.

La Grande-Motte (French pronunciation: [la ɡʁɑ̃d mɔt]; Occitan: La Mota Granda) is a commune in the Hérault département in Occitanie in southern France. The commune was created in 1974 from part of the commune of Mauguio. It is a popular seaside resort and port near Montpellier, built in the 1960s and 1970s. La Grande-Motte is characterized by homogeneous architecture; many of the prominent buildings are pyramidal in form. With 2 million tourists per year it is one of the favorite resorts of the French.

== Government ==
In August 2024, Stephan Rossignol was mayor. He had been in 2012 a UMP candidate for Hérault's 9th constituency.

== International relations ==
La Grande-Motte is twinned with:

- Hornsea, England
- Hoyo de Manzanares, Spain

== Resort ==
The resort town of La Grande-Motte was largely built between 1960 and 1975 as a part of Mission Racine, on virgin beachfront dunes, and is artificially irrigated to create a green environment. The architect of the project, Jean Balladur, drew inspiration from pre-Columbian pyramids such as Teotihuacan, Mexico; and from modernist architecture in Brazil, especially the work of architect Oscar Niemeyer. Balladur developed the master plan for the seaside resort on a site of 750 hectares comprising 450 hectares of land and 300 hectares of wetland. The plan included principles for settlement, with guidelines for each plot, including zones for camping, a town centre, a marina, and a city park. The landscaper Pierre Pillet collaborated on the project, selecting plant species that were tolerant of the marine climate. Jean Balladur imagined a green city. Parking was placed no more than 600 meters away from the beach, to allow visitors to walk there, but keeping all development away from the beach itself. The project incorporated large open spaces surrounding the main buildings. Squares and parks, and sports and leisure services were also planned for the new city. Public and private beaches, the marina and water sports facilities complement the design. The Palais de Congrès (conference centre), a casino and the church of St. Augustine are also key elements.

== Sports ==
Sports facilities available in La Grande-Motte include: sailing, jet skiing, swimming and water skiing.

== Population ==
Historical population
Year	Pop.	±% p.a.
1968	56	—
1975	2,165	+68.56%
1982	3,939	+8.93%
1990	5,016	+3.07%
1999	6,458	+2.85%
2007	8,246	+3.10%
2012	8,509	+0.63%
2017	8,820	+0.72%
2023	8,440	−0.73%
Source: INSEE

== 2024 Beth Yaacov synagogue attack ==
On 24 August 2024, the Beth Yaacov synagogue was targeted in an explosion and attempted arson attack. A police officer was injured. The suspect, who wore a Palestinian flag, was later arrested in Nimes. French president Emmanuel Macron characterized the incident as "a terrorist act". The suspect was a 33-year old man, originally from Algeria. Two of the suspect's associates were also detained. About 200 police officers were involved in the manhunt.
