= Hérault's 9th constituency =

Constituency of the National Assembly of France

9th constituency of Hérault
- inline Constituency of the National Assembly of France

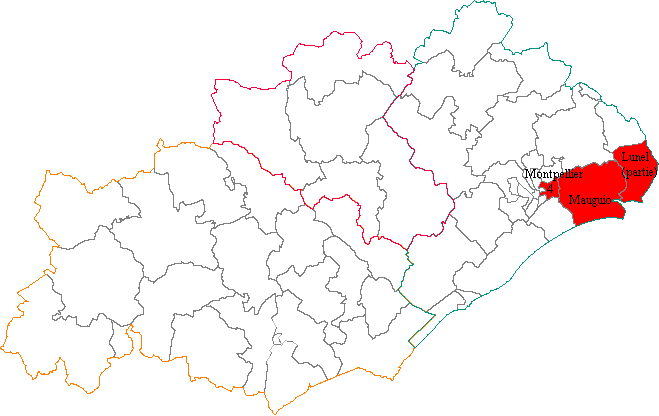
- Location of Constituency in Department

- Hérault in France
- Deputy: Charles Alloncle; LR (UXD)
- Department: Hérault

The 9th constituency of Hérault is a French legislative constituency in the Hérault département.

It was created in the 2010 redistricting, with the first election in 2012. It consists of Canton of Mauguio and the Canton of Montpellier-4, and the communes Lunel, Lunel-Viel, Marsillargues, Saint-Just, Saint-Nazaire-de-Pézan, Valergues.

== Deputies ==
Election	Member	Party
2012	Patrick Vignal	PS
2017	Patrick Vignal	LREM
2022	Patrick Vignal	RE
2024	Charles Alloncle	EXD

== Election results ==
=== 2024 ===
Candidate	Party	Alliance	First round			Second round		
Candidate	Party	Alliance	Votes	%	+/–	Votes	%	+/–
Charles Alloncle	LR-RN	UXD	21,734	36.43	new	28,433	51.90	new
Nadia Belaouni	LFI	NFP	17,463	29.27	1.58	26,353	48.10	+2.47
Patrick Vignal	REN	Ensemble	14,918	25.00	-3.37	withdrew		
Anthony Belin	DVD		2,046	3.43	new			
Frédéric Bort	REC		1,481	2.48	-3.44			
William Viste	DVD		899	1.51	new			
Patrice Boccadifuoco	DVD		584	0.98	new			
Nathalie Peiro	LO		459	0.77	+0.29			
Géry Laly	DVD		82	0.14	new			
Votes			59,666	100.00		54,786	100.00	
Valid votes			59,666	97.22	-0.75	54,786	90.58	+0.50
Blank votes			1,124	1.83	+0.34	4,301	7.11	+0.44
Null votes			581	0.95	+0.41	1,398	2.31	-0.94
Turnout			61,371	67.71	+22.23	60,485	66.72	+22.15
Abstentions			29,271	32.29	-22.23	30,169	33.28	-22.15
Registered voters			90,642			90,654		
Result			EXD GAIN FROM RE					

=== 2022 ===
Legislative Election 2022: Hérault's 9th constituency
Party	Candidate	Votes	%	±%
LREM (Ensemble)	Patrick Vignal	11,307	28.37	-11.52
LFI (NUPÉS)	Nadia Belaouni	11,033	27.69	+3.95
RN	Frédéric Bort	10,058	25.24	+4.68
REC	Maya Bouisset	2,361	5.92	N/A
LR (UDC)	Jean-François Bouscarain	2,267	5.69	−6.91
DVE	Brigitte Baguet	1,012	2.54	N/A
Others	N/A	1,811		
Turnout		39,849	45.48	−1.42
2nd round result
LREM (Ensemble)	Patrick Vignal	19,520	54.37	-10.17
LFI (NUPÉS)	Nadia Belaouni	16,384	45.63	N/A
Turnout		35,904	44.57	+4.02
LREM hold				

=== 2017 ===
Candidate	Label	First round		Second round	
Candidate	Label	Votes	%	Votes	%
Patrick Vignal	REM	15,033	39.89	19,293	64.54
Guillaume Vouzellaud	FN	7,749	20.56	10,600	35.46
Imane Diani	FI	5,723	15.19		
Joëlle Jenin-Vignaud	LR	4,747	12.60		
Bertrand Coisne	ECO	2,674	7.10		
Fredéric Dumay	DLF	679	1.80		
Myriam Hammoud	PCF	547	1.45		
Kamy Nazarian	DIV	291	0.77		
Maurice Chaynes	EXG	243	0.64		
Votes		37,686	100.00	29,893	100.00
Valid votes		37,686	97.82	29,893	89.77
Blank votes		582	1.51	2,446	7.35
Null votes		257	0.67	960	2.88
Turnout		38,525	46.90	33,299	40.55
Abstentions		43,614	53.10	48,826	59.45
Registered voters		82,139		82,125	
Source: Ministry of the Interior

=== 2012 ===
2012 legislative election in Herault's 9th constituency
Candidate	Party	First round		Second round	
Candidate	Party	Votes	%	Votes	%
Patrick Vignal	PS	15,236	34.75%	21,046	50.66%
Stéphan Rossignol	UMP	12,668	28.89%	20,494	49.34%
Joseph Castano	FN	8,746	19.95%		
Annie-Claude Ottan	FG	2,564	5.85%		
Jean-Luc Meissonnier		1,458	3.32%		
Michel De Lagausie	EELV	1,398	3.19%		
Jean-Louis Pelletier		412	0.94%		
Patricia Marra	AEI	383	0.87%		
Paule-Emma Aline	DLR	266	0.61%		
Agnès Dehaye	Cap 21	241	0.55%		
Agnès Olinet	LO	188	0.43%		
Waldeck Moreau		101	0.23%		
Ivan Marty		92	0.21%		
Gérard Beurive		79	0.18%		
Bruno Martin-Vallas		18	0.04%		
Valid votes		43,850	98.52%	41,540	95.68%
Spoilt and null votes		658	1.48%	1,874	4.32%
Votes cast / turnout		44,508	58.86%	43,414	57.41%
Abstentions		31,110	41.14%	32,202	42.59%
Registered voters		75,618	100.00%	75,616	100.00%
