= Valergues–Lansargues station =

Railway station in Valergues, France

Valergues–Lansargues
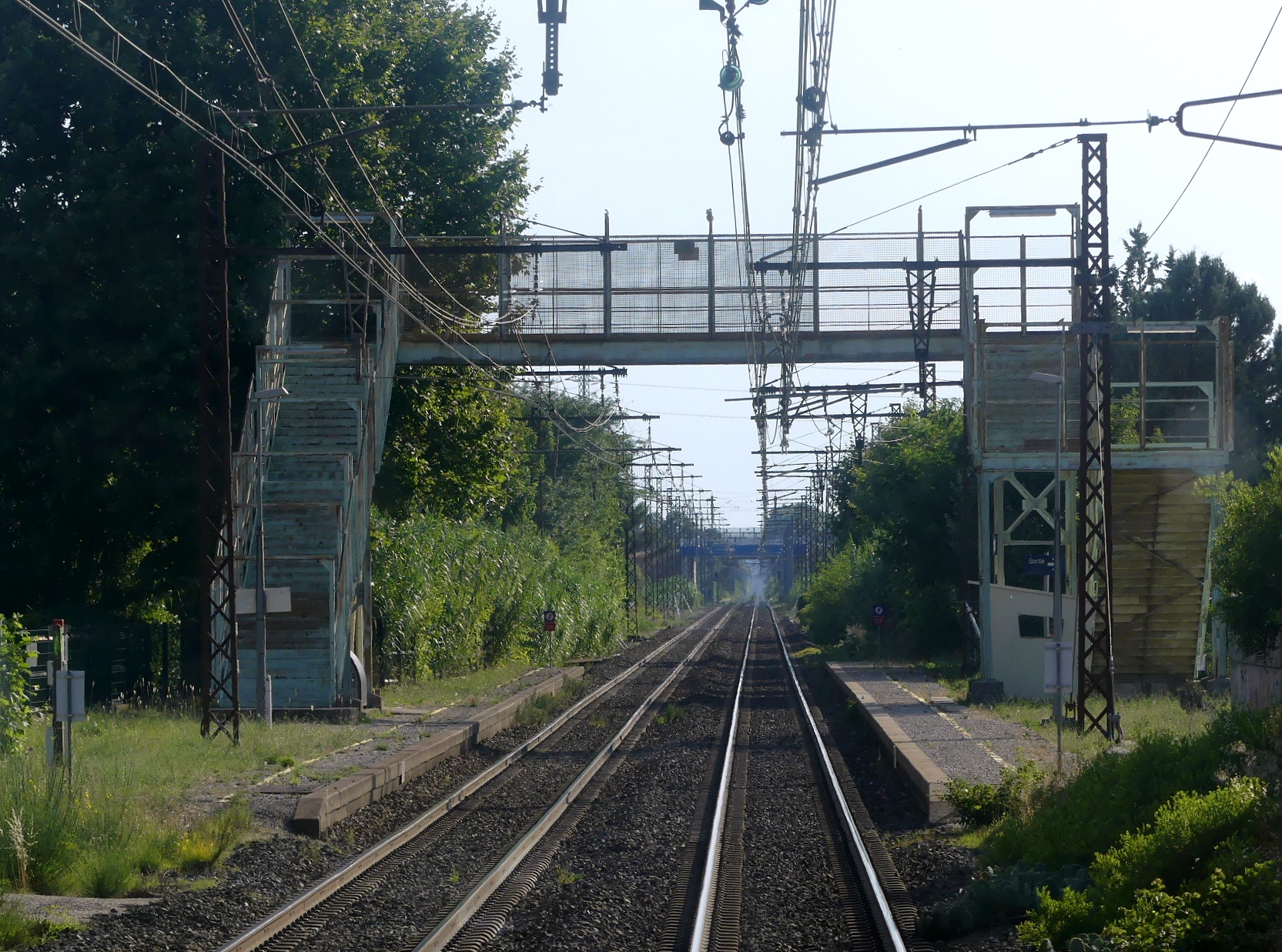
- Valergues–Lansargues station

General information
- Location: Valergues, Occitanie, France
- Coordinates: 43.67276°N 4.06029°E
- Line: Tarascon–Sète railway

Other information
- Station code: 87773432

Services
Preceding station	TER Occitanie	Following station
Baillargues towards Narbonne	21	Lunel-Viel towards Avignon-Centre
Location

Valergues–Lansargues is a railway station in the commune of Valergues, close to Lansargues, Occitanie, southern France. Within TER Occitanie, it is part of line 21 (Narbonne–Avignon).
