= Patrick Vignal =

French politician (born 1958)

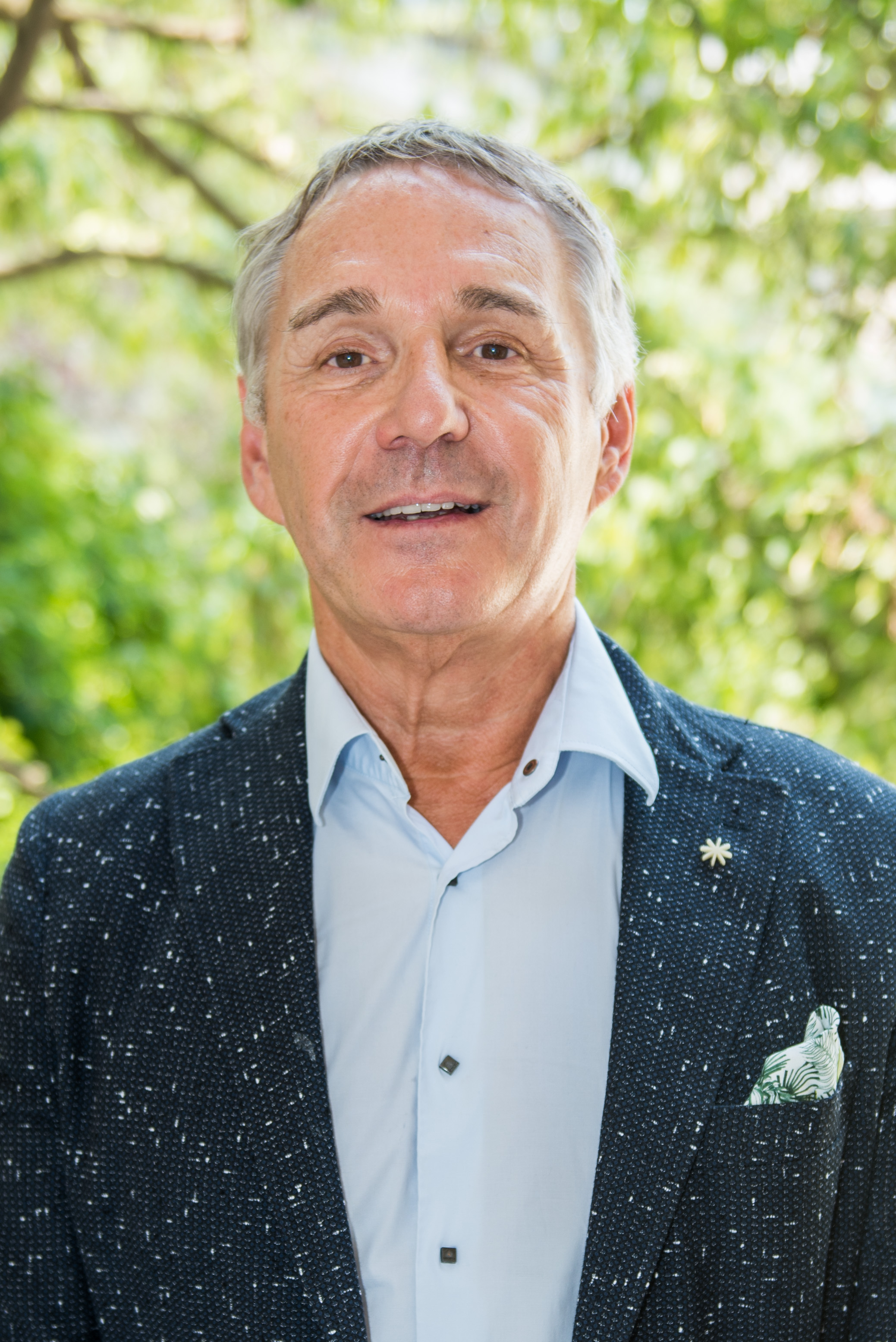
- Vignal in 2017

Member of the National Assembly for Hérault's 9th constituency
- In office 20 June 2012 – 9 June 2024
- Preceded by: Constituency established
- Succeeded by: Charles Alloncle

Personal details
- Born: 22 January 1958 (age 68) Montpellier, France
- Party: Renaissance (2017–present)
- Other political affiliations: Socialist Party (until 2017)

Patrick Vignal (French pronunciation: [patʁik viɲal]; born 22 January 1958) is a French politician who represented the 9th constituency of the Hérault department in the National Assembly from 2012 to 2024. A member of Renaissance (RE, formerly La République En Marche!) who was originally elected to Parliament as a member of the Socialist Party (PS), he previously served as a Deputy Mayor of Montpellier (2001–2012) and held the canton of Montpellier-4 seat in the General Council of Hérault (2008–2012).

== Political career ==
Vignal was first elected to the National Assembly in the 2012 legislative election. He was reelected in 2017 and 2022. He ran for reelection to a fourth term in office in the 2024 snap election; placing third in the first round of voting, he withdrew ahead of the second round.

In Parliament, Vignal served as a member of the Committee on Cultural Affairs and Education. In addition to his committee assignments, he was a member of the French-Cuban parliamentary friendship group.

== Other activities ==
- Fonds pour le développement de la vie associative (FDVA), Member of the Advisory Board
