= Suzanne Ballivet =

French draughtswoman and illustrator

Suzanne Ballivet (12 August 1904, Paris, 7th arrondissement – 15 June 1985, Saint-Aunès, Hérault) was a French draughtswoman and illustrator. She is best known today for her erotic illustrations of works by Pierre Louÿs, Alfred de Musset, Leopold von Sacher-Masoch, and others. According to the Benezit Dictionary of Artists, Ballivet is considered a 20th century "pioneer" in the genre of erotic book illustration.

Ballivet studied in École des Beaux Arts in Montpellier. In 1925 she married Camille Descossy. In 1927 she went to Paris where she did fashion design and exhibited at the L’Exposition Coloniale internationale. She returned to Montpellier in 1931, making theater sets and costumes for Jean Catel's troupe as well as anatomy drawings. After divorce in 1941, she returned to Paris, working as an illustrator and cartoonist for humor magazines. She remarried with caricaturist and illustrator Albert Dubout in 1968, living afterwards in Mézy-sur-Seine and Saint-Aunès. She is buried on the Saint-Fulcrand cemetery in Saint-Aunès

== Sources ==
- "Ballivet, Suzanne". Benezit Dictionary of Artists. Retrieved 22 April 2023.
