= Palavas-les-Flots =

- Commune
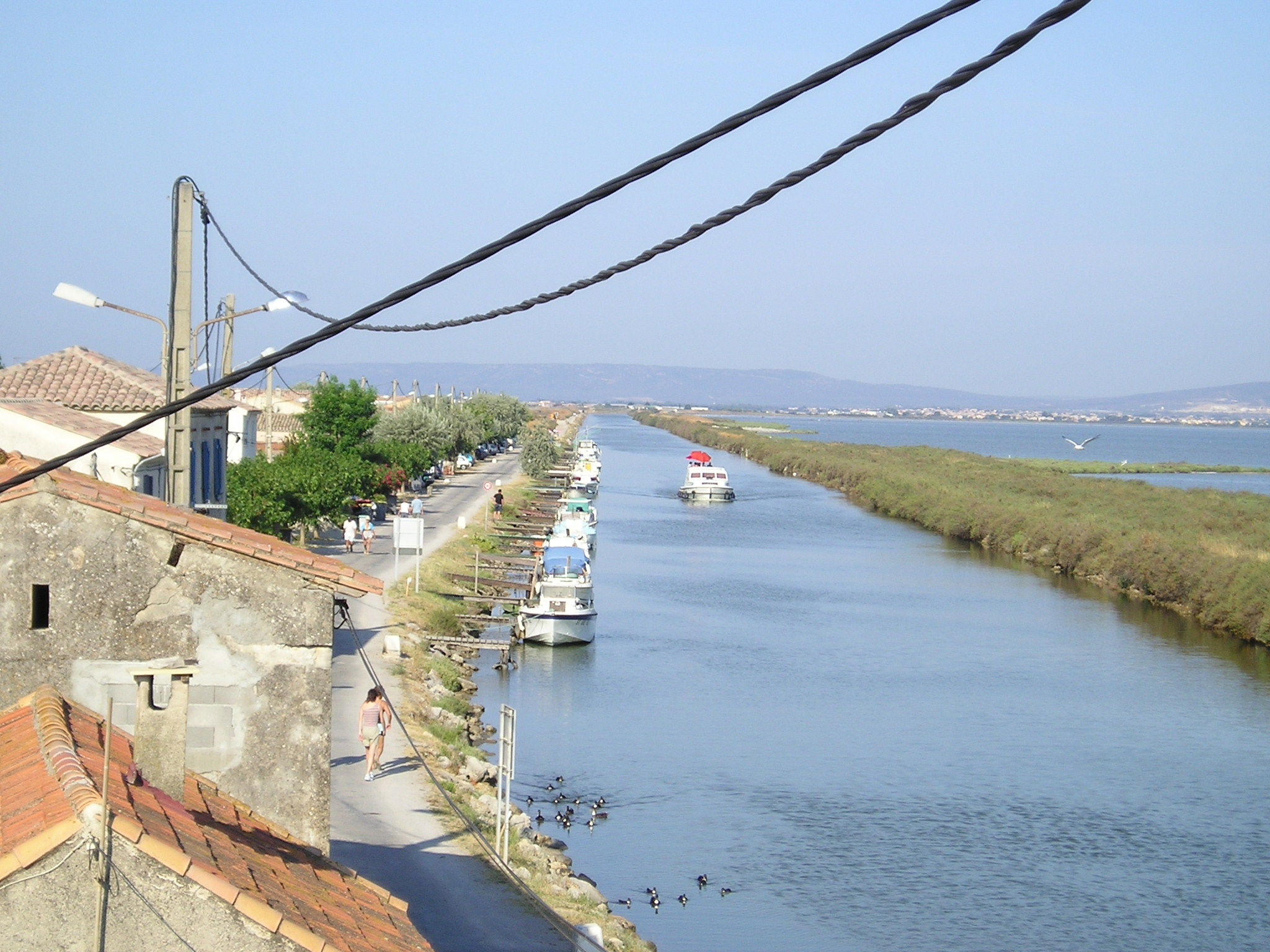
- Canal du Rhône à Sète

- Coat of arms
- Location of Palavas-les-Flots
- Location within France Location within Occitanie
- Coordinates: 43°31′49″N 3°55′53″E
- Country: France
- Region: Occitania
- Department: Hérault
- Arrondissement: Montpellier
- Canton: Mauguio
- Intercommunality: CA Pays de l'Or

Government
  - Mayor (2020–2026): Christian Jeanjean
- Area^{1}: 2.38 km^{2} (0.92 sq mi)
- Highest elevation: 3 m (9.8 ft)
- Lowest elevation: 0 m (0 ft)
- Population (2023): 6,133
  - Density: 2,580/km^{2} (6,670/sq mi)
- Time zone: UTC+01:00 (CET)
  - Summer (DST): UTC+02:00 (CEST)
- INSEE/Postal code: 34192 /34250
- ^{1} French Land Register data, which excludes lakes, ponds, glaciers > 1 km^{2} (0.386 sq mi or 247 acres) and river estuaries.

Palavas-les-Flots (French pronunciation: [palavas le flo]; Languedocien: Palavàs) is a commune in the Hérault department in the Occitanie region in southern France.

== Geography ==
Palavas is a fishing village and seaside resort 9 km south of Montpellier at the Gulf of Lion and the Mediterranean. It lies on sand dunes that separate two lakes, the Étang de l'Arnel and the Étang du Méjean, from the sea. Its neighbouring communities are Lattes, Pérols, Mauguio and Villeneuve-lès-Maguelone. Its center is where the River Lez flows through a canalized section into the sea. Northwards it stretches to Mauguio; southwards expansion is halted by a military area and an area used by the Ifremer.

=== Climate ===
Palavas' Mediterranean climate is warm and dry in the summer and mild and humid in winter.

== History ==
The village originated as a settlement of fishermen who sold their catch on the markets of Montpellier. The Ancien Régime used the village as a coastal defence, building the Redoute de Ballestras.

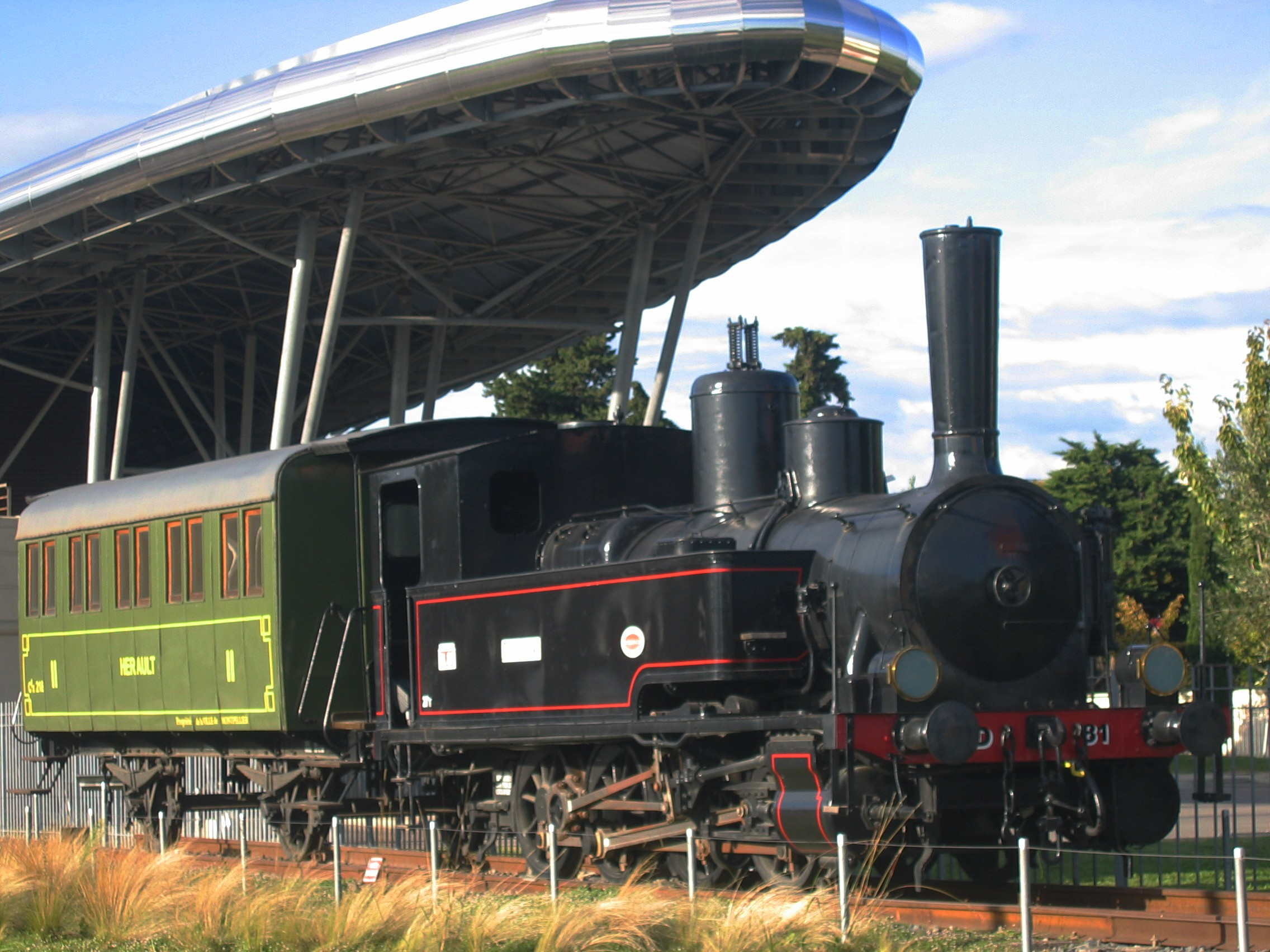
The historical train from Montpellier to Palavas, now exhibited in Montpellier

From the beginning of the 19th century, local tourists and seasonal activities were drawn to the village. When in 1872 a local train to and from Montpellier started service, seaside tourism really took off. This train operated until 1968 and was painted by Albert Dubout.

== Population ==
Historical population
Year	Pop.	±% p.a.
1968	2,390	—
1975	3,345	+4.92%
1982	4,062	+2.81%
1990	4,748	+1.97%
1999	5,421	+1.48%
2007	6,048	+1.38%
2012	6,106	+0.19%
2017	5,977	−0.43%
2023	6,133	+0.43%
Source: INSEE

== Economy ==
The mainstay of Palavas' economy is tourism. It is one of the most popular places in this part of France's coastline. In the film The Triplets of Belleville (Les Triplettes de Belleville), there is a song about the village. Apart from strolling, bathing and tanning there are also two museums: one dedicated to Albert Dubout and one dedicated to the local train to Montpellier.

The 45m high former local water tower can be seen from afar and features a revolving restaurant on top and a congress centre.

== International relations ==
Palavas-les-Flots is twinned with:

- Sainte-Catherine-de-la-Jacques-Cartier, Quebec,
- Bayside, Victoria, Australia.

== See also ==
- Communes of the Hérault department
- Phare de la méditerranée
