= Communauté d'agglomération du Pays de l'Or =

Pays de l'Or
- Communauté d'agglomération
- Interactive map of Pays de l'Or
- Coordinates: 43°37′N 04°02′E
- Country: France
- Region: Occitania
- Department: Hérault
- No. of communes: {{{nbcomm}}}
- Established: 1993
- Area: 114.8 km^{2} (44.3 sq mi)
- Population (2019): 44,890
  - Density: 391.0/km^{2} (1,013/sq mi)
- Website: www.paysdelor.fr

Communauté d'agglomération du Pays de l'Or is the communauté d'agglomération, an intercommunal structure, centred on the town of Mauguio. It is located in the Hérault department, in the Occitania region, southern France. Created in 1993, its seat is in Mauguio. Its area is 114.8 km^{2}. Its population was 44,890 in 2019, of which 16,705 in Mauguio proper.

== Composition ==
The communauté d'agglomération consists of the following 8 communes:

1. Candillargues
2. La Grande-Motte
3. Lansargues
4. Mauguio
5. Mudaison
6. Palavas-les-Flots
7. Saint-Aunès
8. Valergues
