= Mudaison =

- Commune
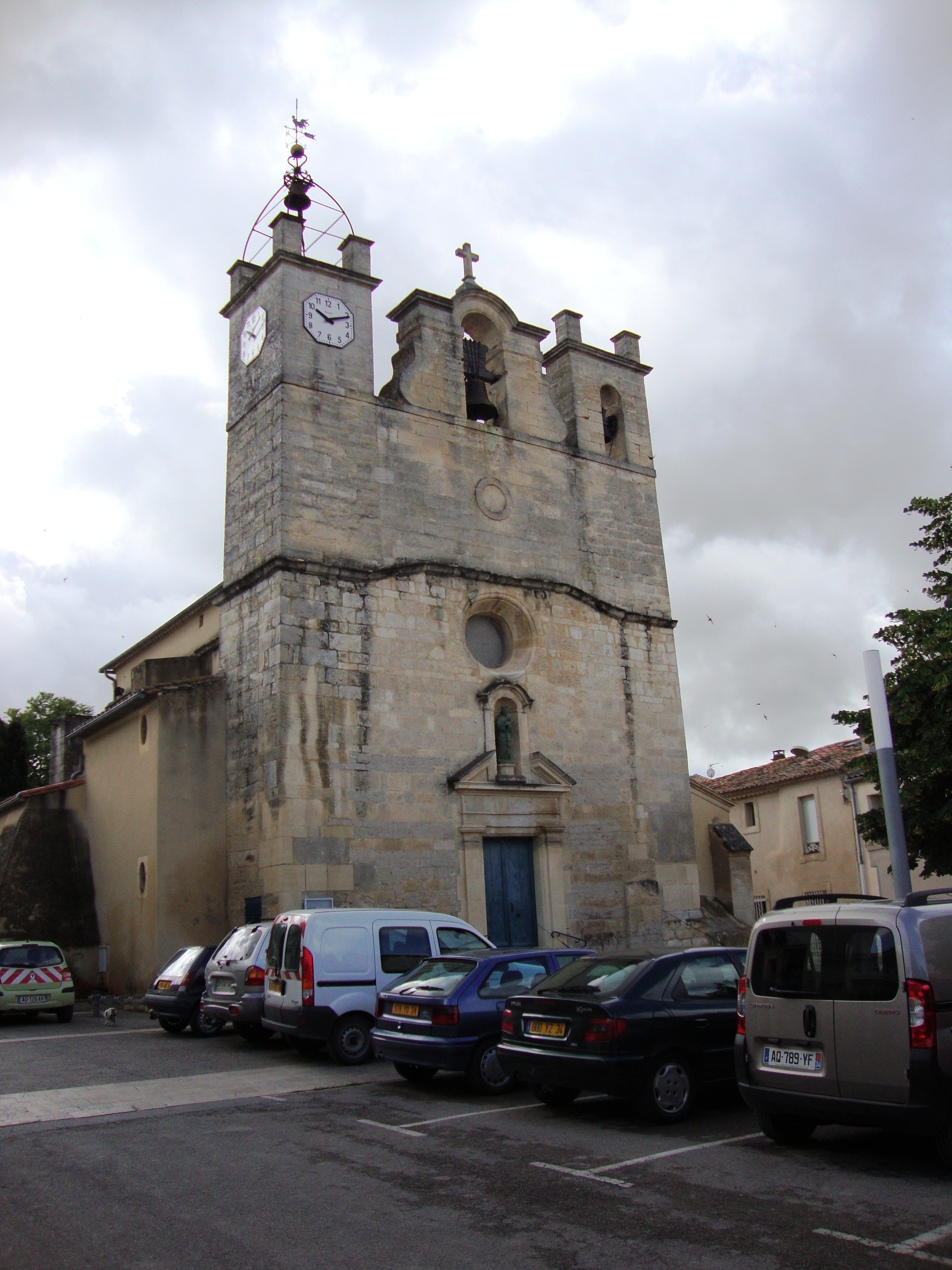
- The church of Saint-Ascicle and Sainte-Victoire

- Coat of arms
- Location of Mudaison
- Location within France Location within Occitanie
- Coordinates: 43°38′50″N 4°02′24″E
- Country: France
- Region: Occitania
- Department: Hérault
- Arrondissement: Montpellier
- Canton: Mauguio
- Intercommunality: CA Pays de l'Or

Government
  - Mayor (2022–2026): Juan Ortega
- Area^{1}: 8.10 km^{2} (3.13 sq mi)
- Highest elevation: 21 m (69 ft)
- Lowest elevation: 4 m (13 ft)
- Population (2023): 3,009
  - Density: 371/km^{2} (962/sq mi)
- Time zone: UTC+01:00 (CET)
  - Summer (DST): UTC+02:00 (CEST)
- INSEE/Postal code: 34176 /34130
- ^{1} French Land Register data, which excludes lakes, ponds, glaciers > 1 km^{2} (0.386 sq mi or 247 acres) and river estuaries.

Mudaison (French pronunciation: [mydɛzɔ̃]; Occitan: Mudason) is a commune in the Hérault department in the Occitanie region in southern France.

== Population ==
Historical population
Year	Pop.	±% p.a.
1968	701	—
1975	741	+0.80%
1982	1,268	+7.98%
1990	1,845	+4.80%
1999	2,262	+2.29%
2007	2,479	+1.15%
2012	2,528	+0.39%
2017	2,593	+0.51%
2023	3,009	+2.51%
Source: INSEE

== See also ==
- Communes of the Hérault department
