= Candillargues =

- Commune
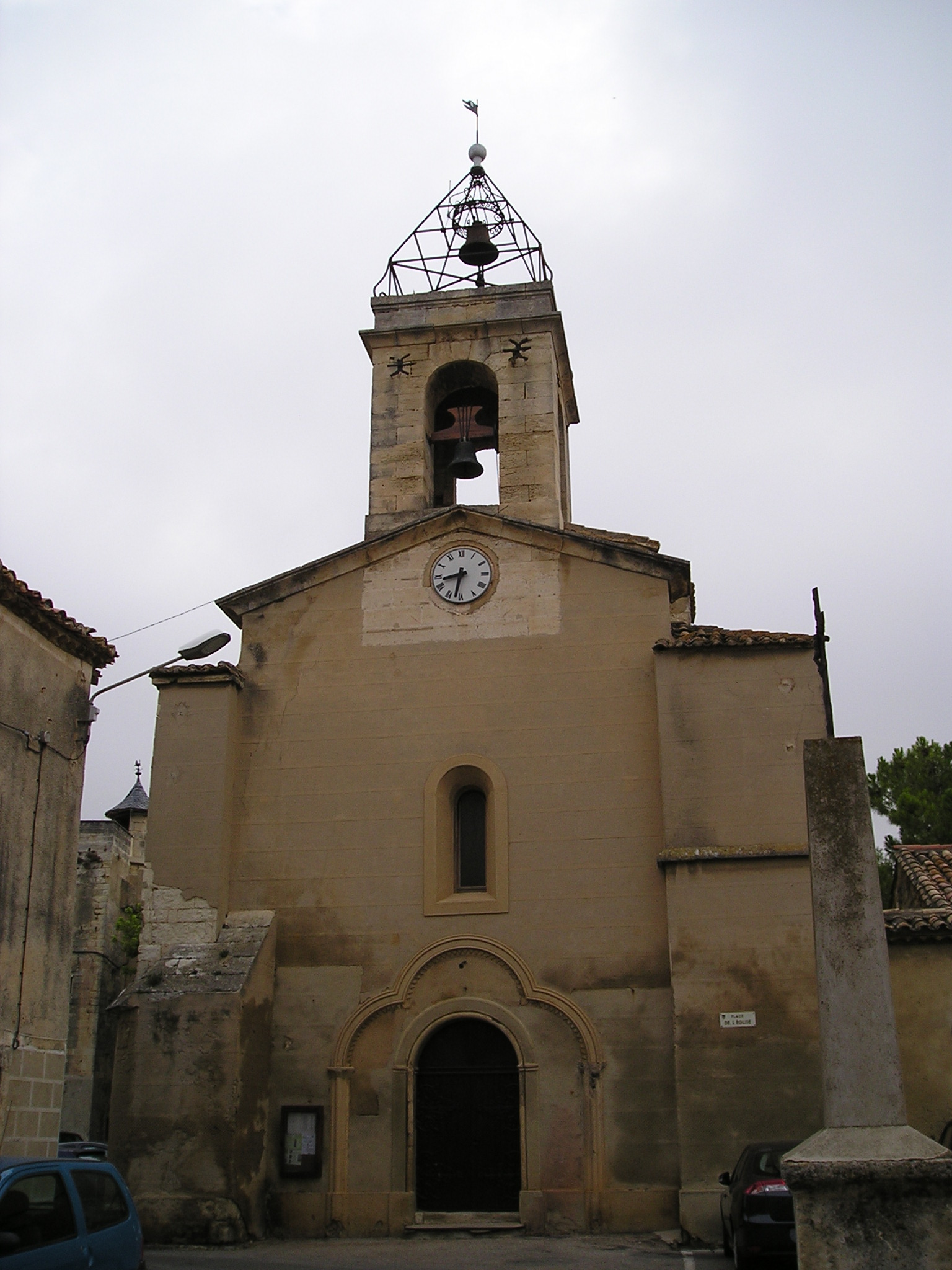
- Church

- Coat of arms
- Location of Candillargues
- Location within France Location within Occitanie
- Coordinates: 43°37′15″N 4°04′08″E
- Country: France
- Region: Occitania
- Department: Hérault
- Arrondissement: Montpellier
- Canton: Mauguio
- Intercommunality: CA Pays de l'Or

Government
  - Mayor (2020–2026): Anthony Melin
- Area^{1}: 8.23 km^{2} (3.18 sq mi)
- Highest elevation: 7 m (23 ft)
- Lowest elevation: 0 m (0 ft)
- Population (2023): 2,091
  - Density: 254/km^{2} (658/sq mi)
- Time zone: UTC+01:00 (CET)
  - Summer (DST): UTC+02:00 (CEST)
- INSEE/Postal code: 34050 /34130
- ^{1} French Land Register data, which excludes lakes, ponds, glaciers > 1 km^{2} (0.386 sq mi or 247 acres) and river estuaries.

Candillargues (French pronunciation: [kɑ̃dijaʁɡ]; Occitan: Candilhargues) is a commune in the Hérault department in southern France.

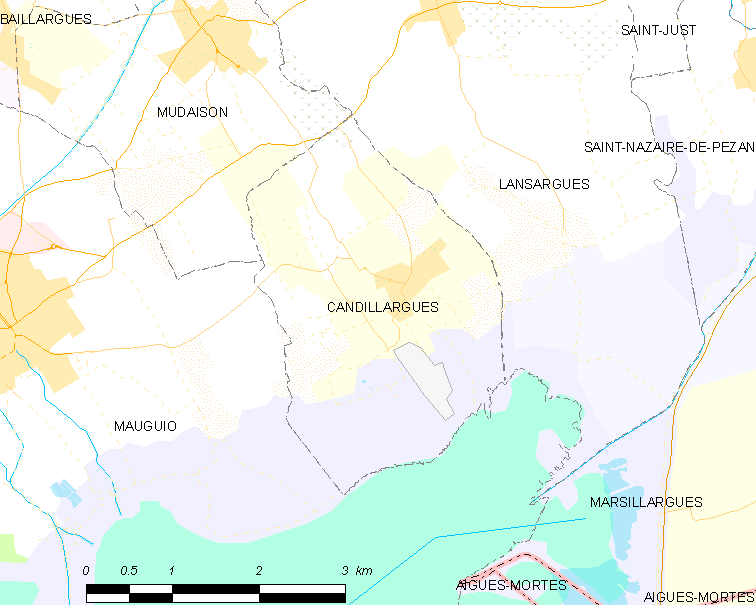
Map

== Population ==
Historical population
Year	Pop.	±% p.a.
1968	311	—
1975	292	−0.90%
1982	476	+7.23%
1990	687	+4.69%
1999	1,143	+5.82%
2007	1,255	+1.18%
2012	1,506	+3.71%
2017	1,742	+2.95%
2023	2,091	+3.09%
Source: INSEE

== History ==
During French Revolution, Candillargues took the name Côme-de-la-Palus.

== See also ==
- Communes of the Hérault department
