= Canton of Mauguio =

Coordinates: 43.62°N 4.01°E

Mauguio
- Canton
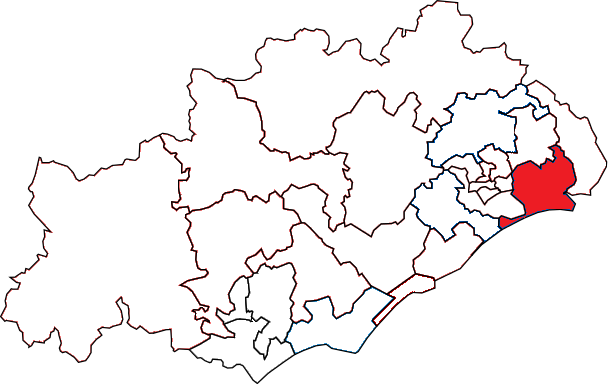
- Interactive map of Mauguio
- Country: France
- Region: Occitania
- Department: Hérault
- No. of communes: {{{nbcomm}}}

Government
  - Representatives (2021–2028): Brice Bonnefoux; Patricia Moullin-Traffort
- Area: 114.76 km^{2} (44.31 sq mi)
- Population (2023): 46,196
  - Density: 402.54/km^{2} (1,042.6/sq mi)
- INSEE code: 34 13

The canton of Mauguio is an administrative division of the Hérault department, southern France. Its borders were modified at the French canton reorganisation which came into effect in March 2015. Its seat is in Mauguio.

== Composition ==
It consists of the following communes:

1. Candillargues
2. La Grande-Motte
3. Lansargues
4. Mauguio
5. Mudaison
6. Palavas-les-Flots
7. Saint-Aunès
8. Valergues

== Councillors ==
Election	Councillors	Party	Occupation
2015	Brice Bonnefoux	LR	Councillor of La Grande-Motte
2015	Marie-Thérèse Bruguière	LR	Mayor of Saint-Aunès; Member of the French Senate for Hérault

== Pictures of the canton ==
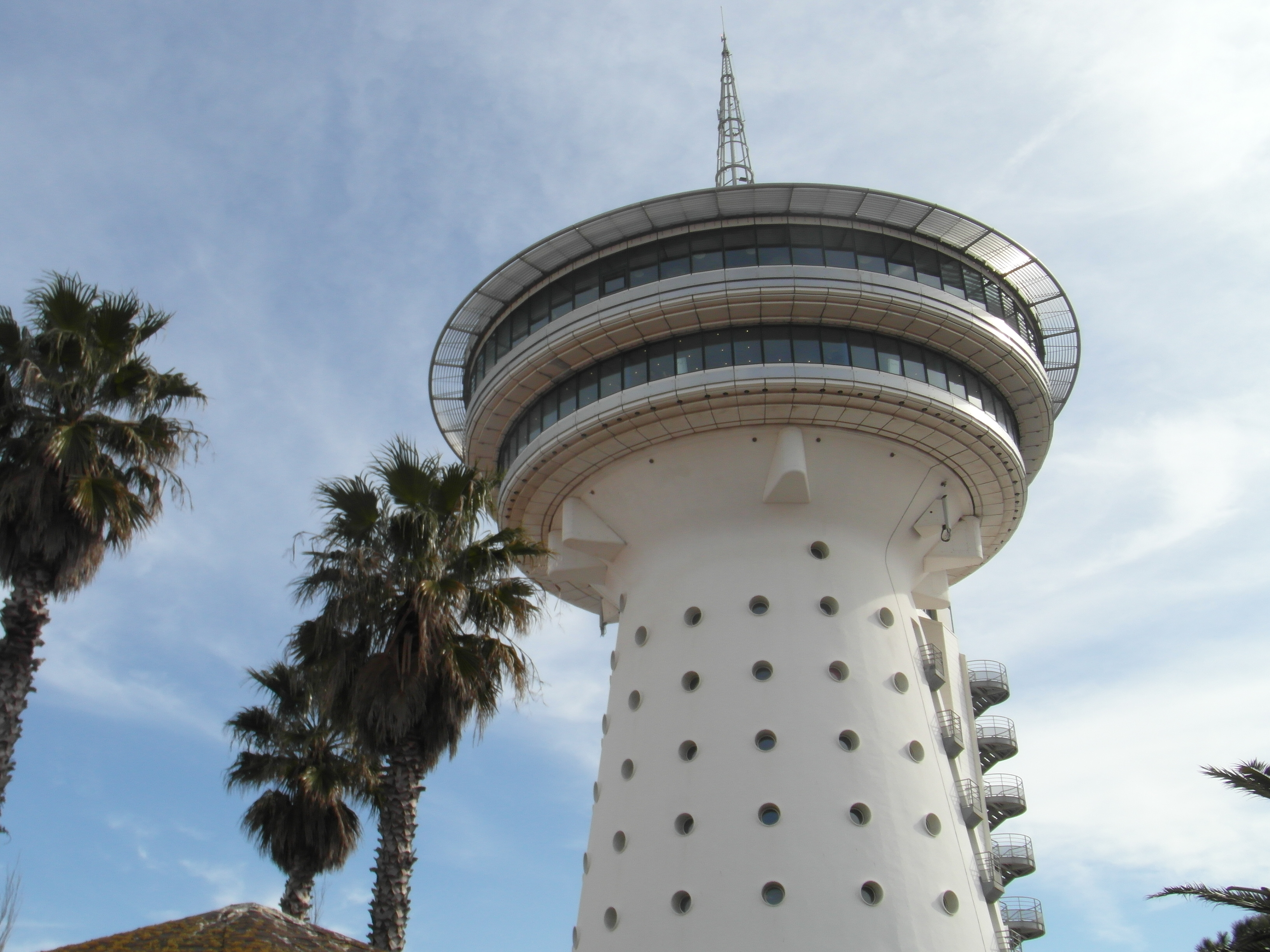
Phare de la méditerranée in Palavas-les-Flots

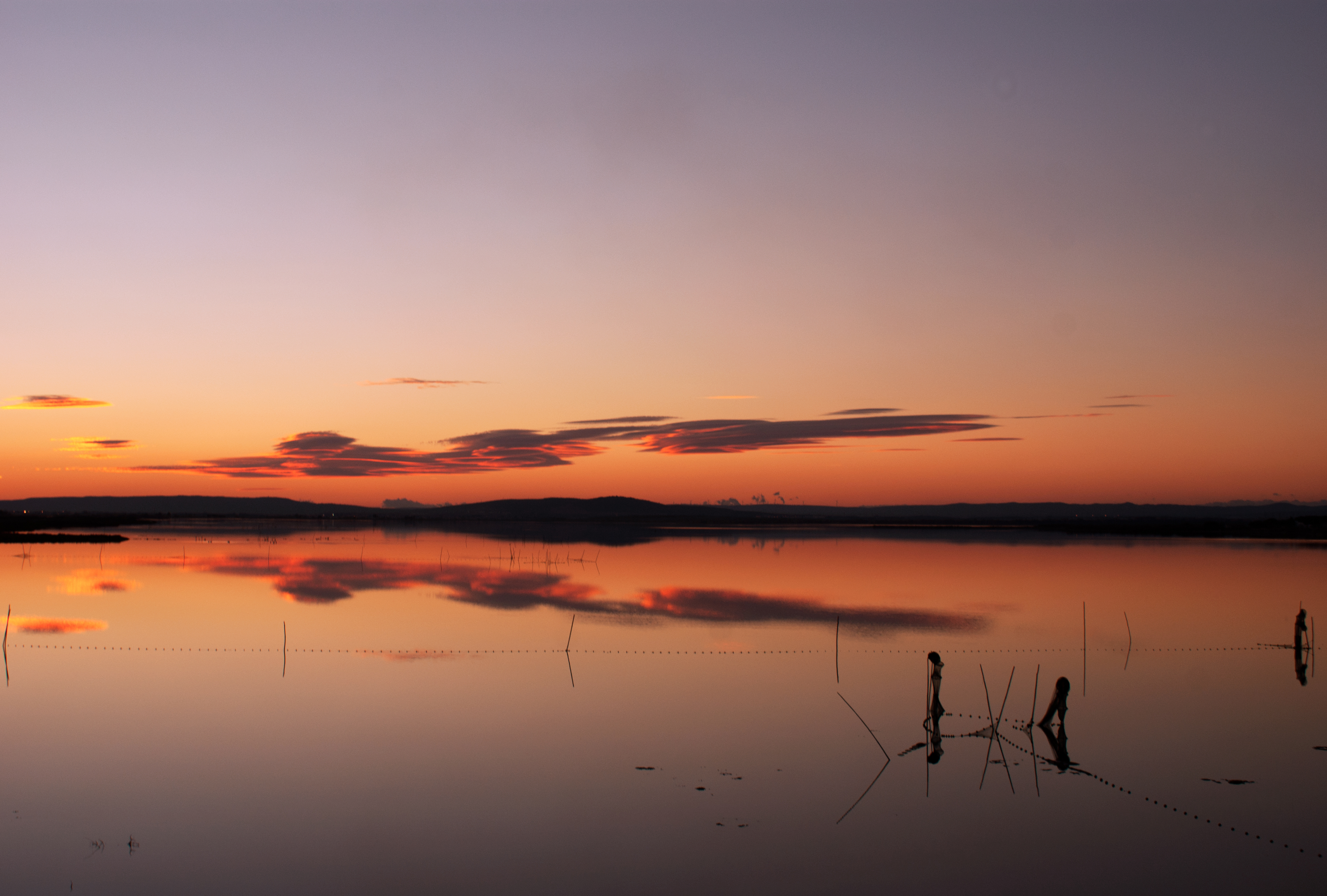
Mauguio Beach

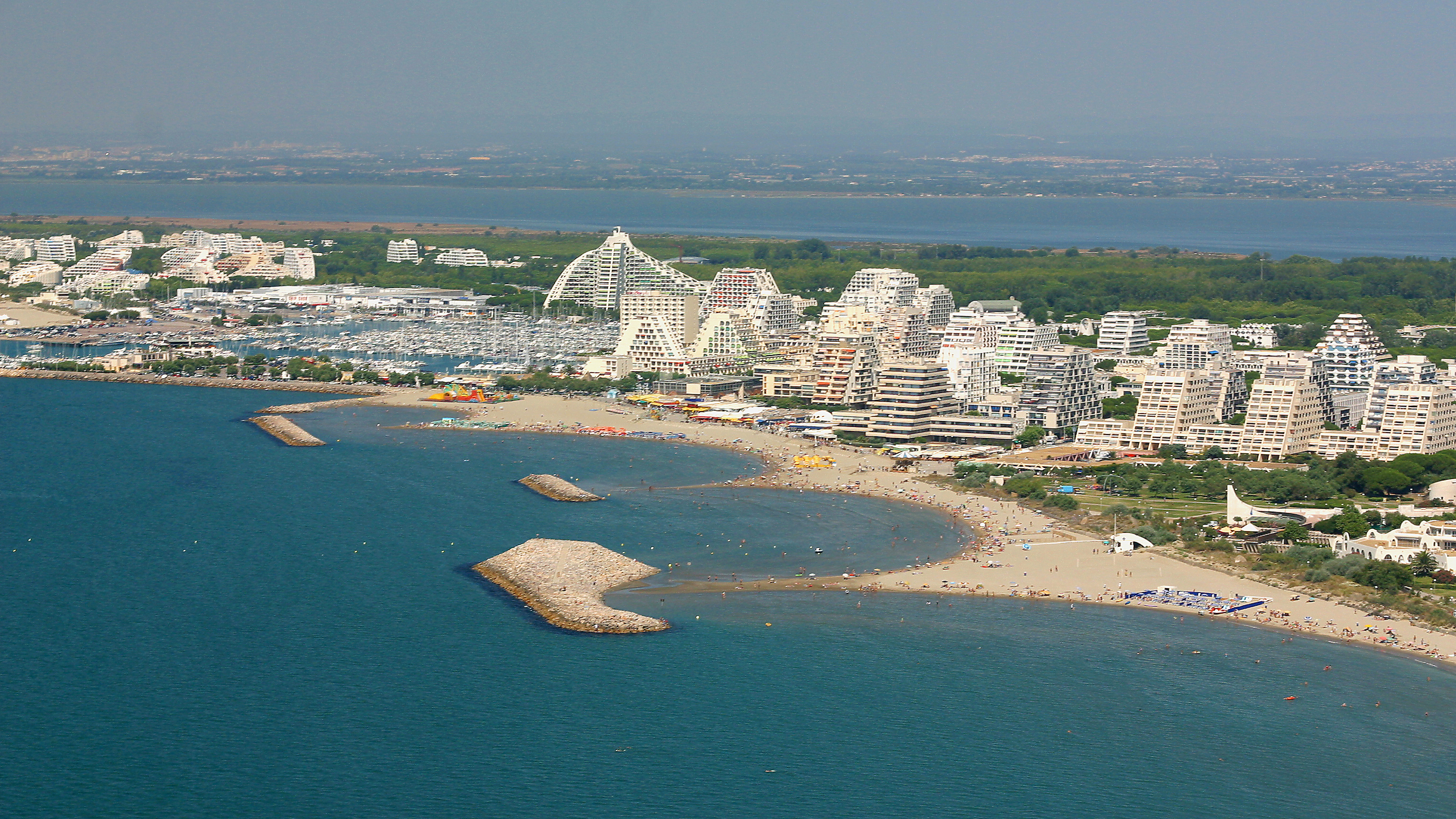
View of La Grande-Motte
