= Charles Alloncle =

French politician (born 1993)

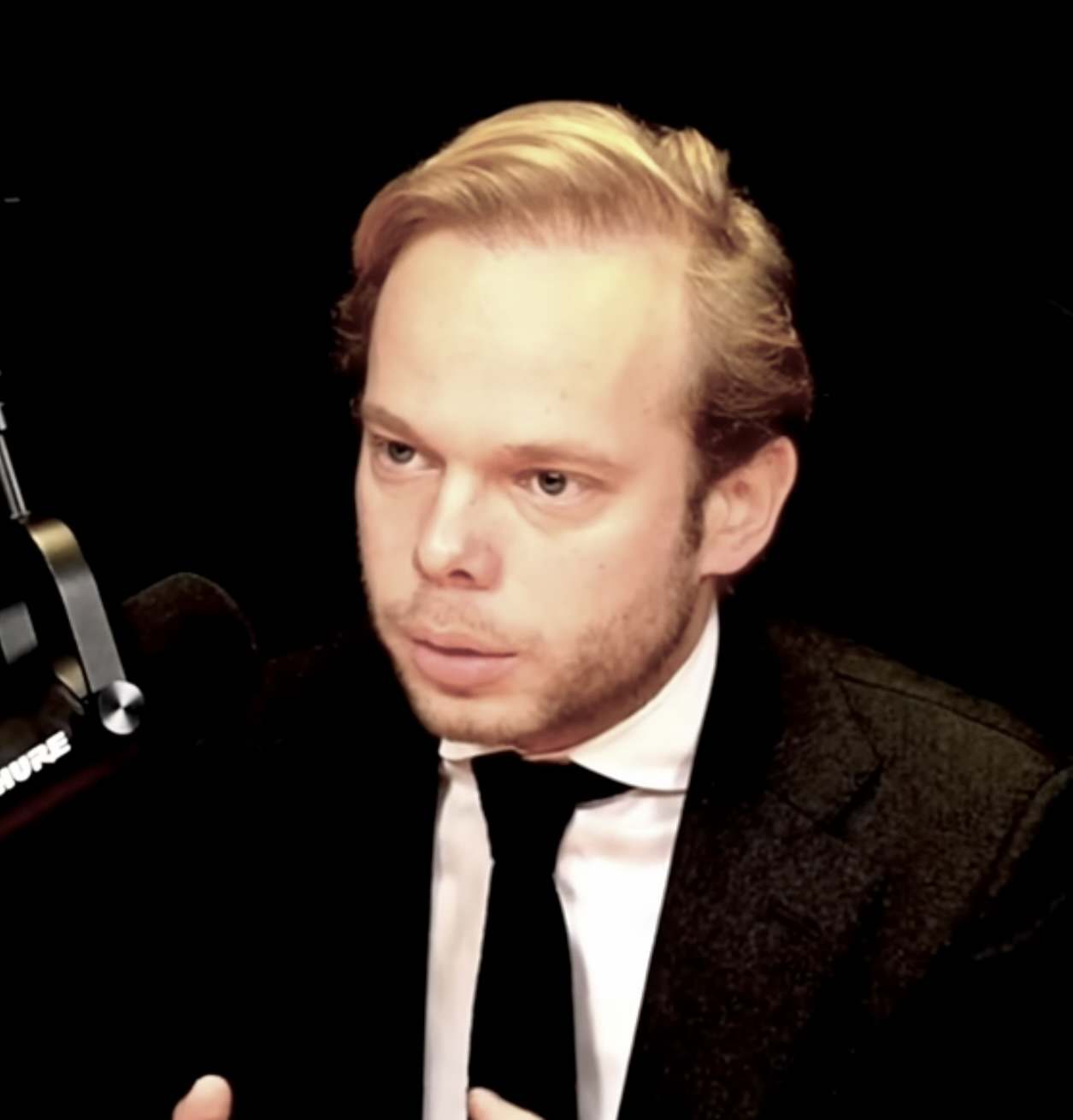
- Alloncle in 2025

Member of the National Assembly for Hérault's 9th constituency
- Incumbent
- Assumed office 8 July 2024
- Preceded by: Patrick Vignal

Personal details
- Born: 21 October 1993 (age 32) Nancy, France
- Party: Union of the Right for the Republic (2024–present)
- Other political affiliations: Union for a Popular Movement (2014–2015); The Republicans (2015–2024)
- Education: Sciences Po; HEC Paris

Charles-Henri "Charles" Alloncle (French pronunciation: [ʃaʁl alɔ̃kl]; born 21 October 1993) is a French politician who has represented the 9th constituency of the Hérault department in the National Assembly since 2024. He is a member of the Union of the Right for the Republic (UDR).

== Early life and career ==
Alloncle was born in Nancy, the son of a prefect. He first became involved in politics when he was in middle school during the 2007 presidential election. In 2008 he launched the UMP Lycée with a friend, and later became president of the UMP at Sciences Po. He is also a graduate of HEC Paris.

In 2018, he was a candidate for president of The Republicans' youth wing Les Jeunes Républicains. After failing to be elected, he left the party and maintained links with the National Rally.

In 2024, Alloncle was elected as a deputy in the 9th constituency of Hérault under the alliance with the National Rally led by former The Republicans president Éric Ciotti, whom he followed in the newly-founded Union of the Right for the Republic.
