= Saint-Aunès station =

Railway station in Saint-Aunès, France

Saint-Aunès
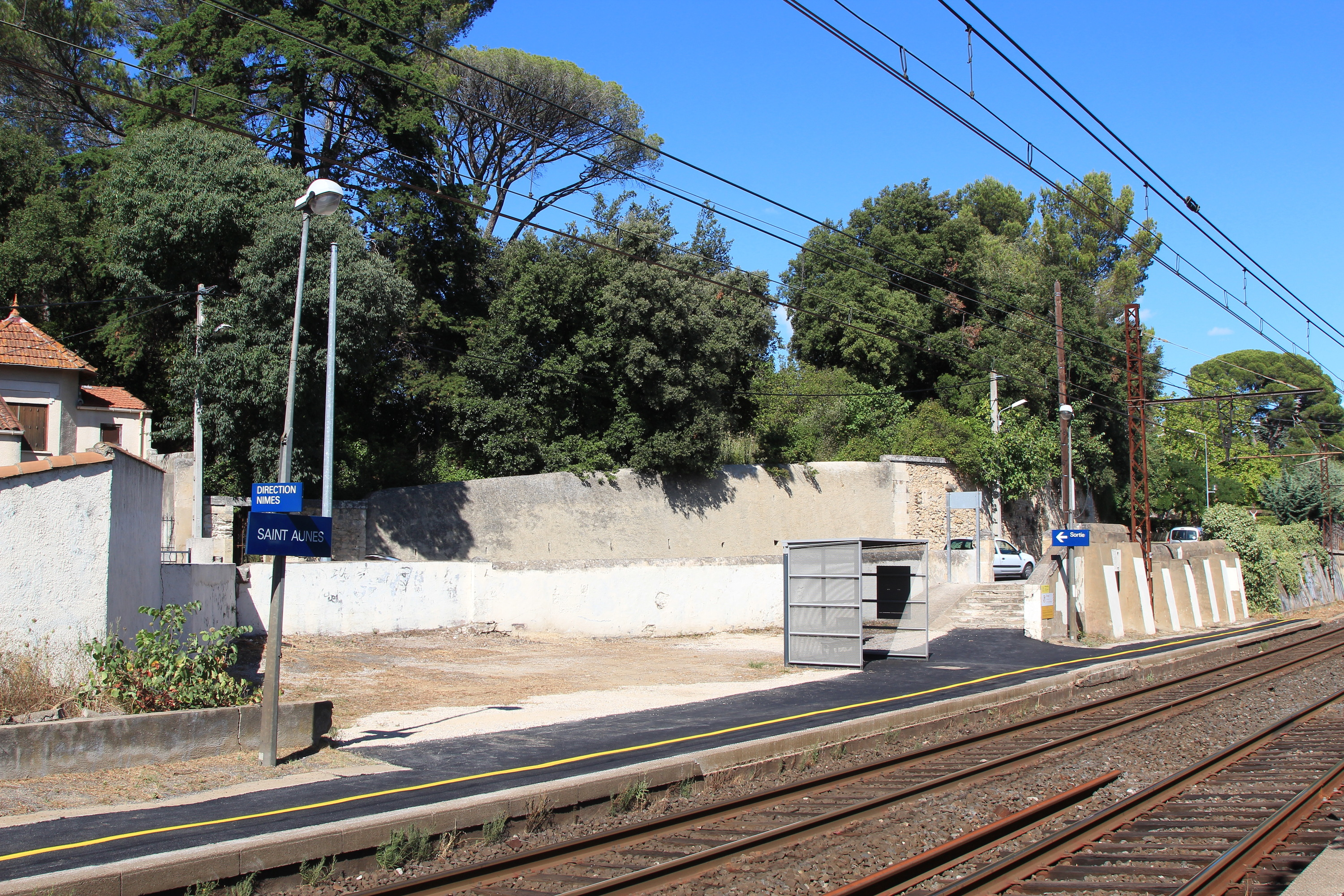
- St-Aunès station

General information
- Location: Saint-Aunès, Occitanie, France
- Coordinates: 43.63543°N 3.96332°E
- Line: Tarascon–Sète railway

Other information
- Station code: 87773465

History
- Opened: 1845

Services
| Preceding station | TER Occitanie | Following station |
|---|---|---|
| Montpellier towards Narbonne | 21 | Baillargues towards Avignon-Centre |
Location

Saint-Aunès is a railway station in Saint-Aunès, Occitanie, southern France. Within TER Occitanie, it is part of line 21 (Narbonne–Avignon).
