= Albert Dubout =

French painter (1905–1976)

Albert Dubout (15 May 1905 – 27 June 1976) was a French cartoonist, illustrator, painter, and sculptor.

== Biography ==
Albert Dubout was born in Marseille. After attending school at Nîmes (where he met Jean Paulhan) he studied at the fine arts school in Montpellier where he met his first wife, Renée Altier, and where his first drawings were published in the student journal L'écho des étudiants in 1923.

After moving to Paris, literary director Philippe Soupault was the first to hire him to illustrate a book, Les Embarras de Paris by Nicolas Boileau-Despréaux. Dubout continued on to illustrate numerous editions of books by Boileau, Beaumarchais, Mérimée, Rabelais, Villon, Cervantes, Balzac, Racine, Voltaire, Rostand, Poe, and Courteline.

He collaborated on numerous magazines and journals such as Le Rire, Marianne, Eclats de Rire, L'os à Moëlle, Paris-Soir, and Ici-Paris.

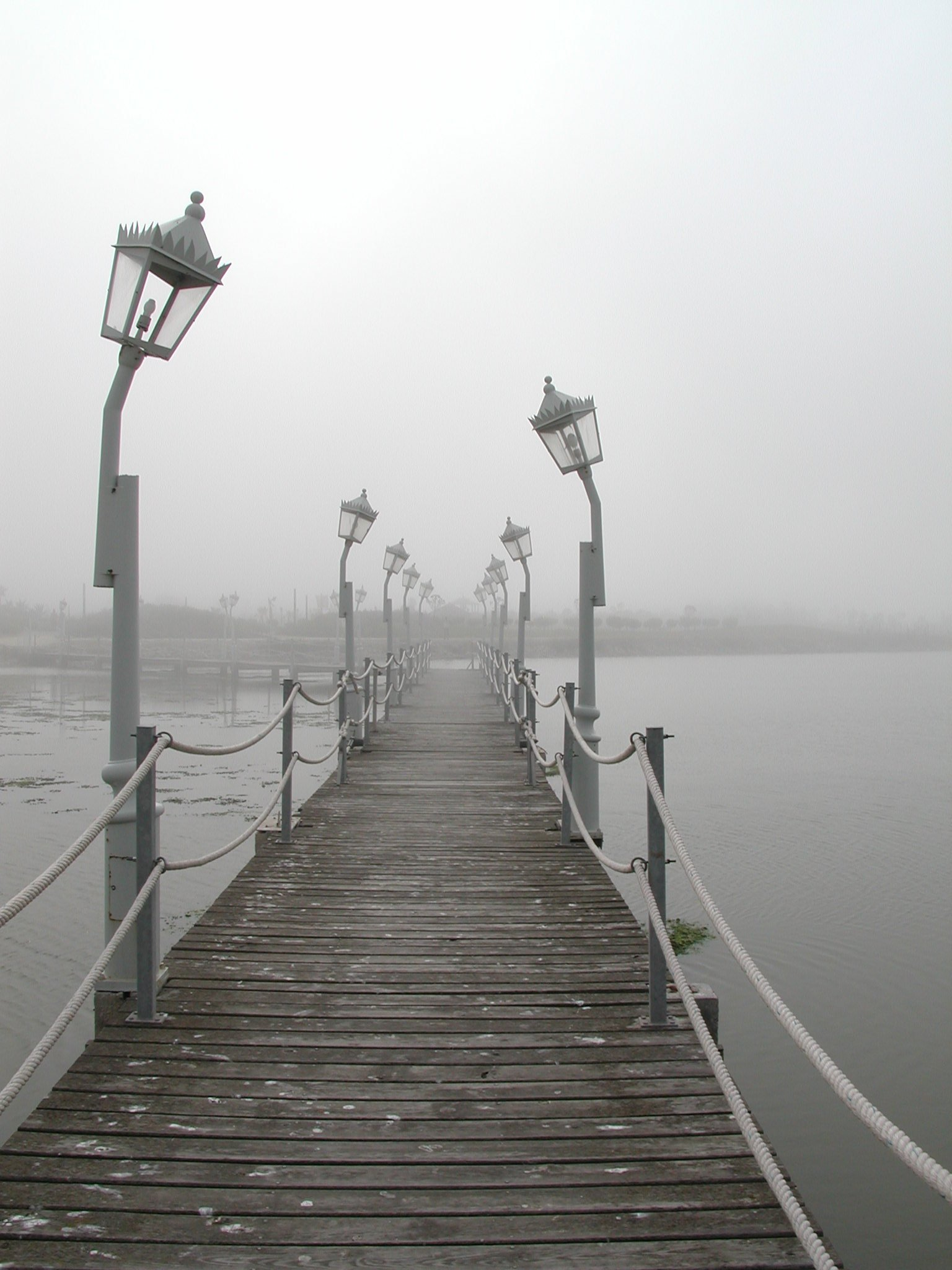
Entrance to the Dubout Museum in Palavas-les-Flots

He also created movie and theatre posters as well as theatrical sets. He worked in advertising, painted oil canvases (over 70 in total) and illustrated many book covers and record sleeves.

Albert Dubout also illustrated Gargantua and Pantagruel, oeuvres of the famous French satirist Rabelais. Among his favorite and perhaps unwilling models were an obese tobacconist and the small and scrawny tax collector who lived in the forties and fifties in Agde, Herault, France.

In 1953, French president Vincent Auriol awarded him the Legion of Honour. His name also appeared that year in the Petit Larousse dictionary.

In 1965, he illustrated the San-Antonio book series, at the request of author Frédéric Dard.

In 1967 he married his second wife, Suzanne Ballivet, who was also a painter. He divided his time in this period between Mézy-sur-Seine, near Paris, and Palavas-les-Flots, on the south coast, until his death in 1976.

In 1992, a museum about Dubout was dedicated in Palavas-les-Flots.

== Honours and awards ==
- Chevalier of the Order of Legion of Honour

== Anecdotes ==
- In his caricatures, Dubout frequently mocked the "little train of Palavas", which ran from nearby Montpellier, and the tourists who visited his little seaside town from there.

== Bibliography ==
- Dubout. Carton, les cahiers du dessin d'humour. 1975.
- Dubout, affiches. Editions M. Trinckvel. 1985.
