= Valergues =

Commune in France

- Commune
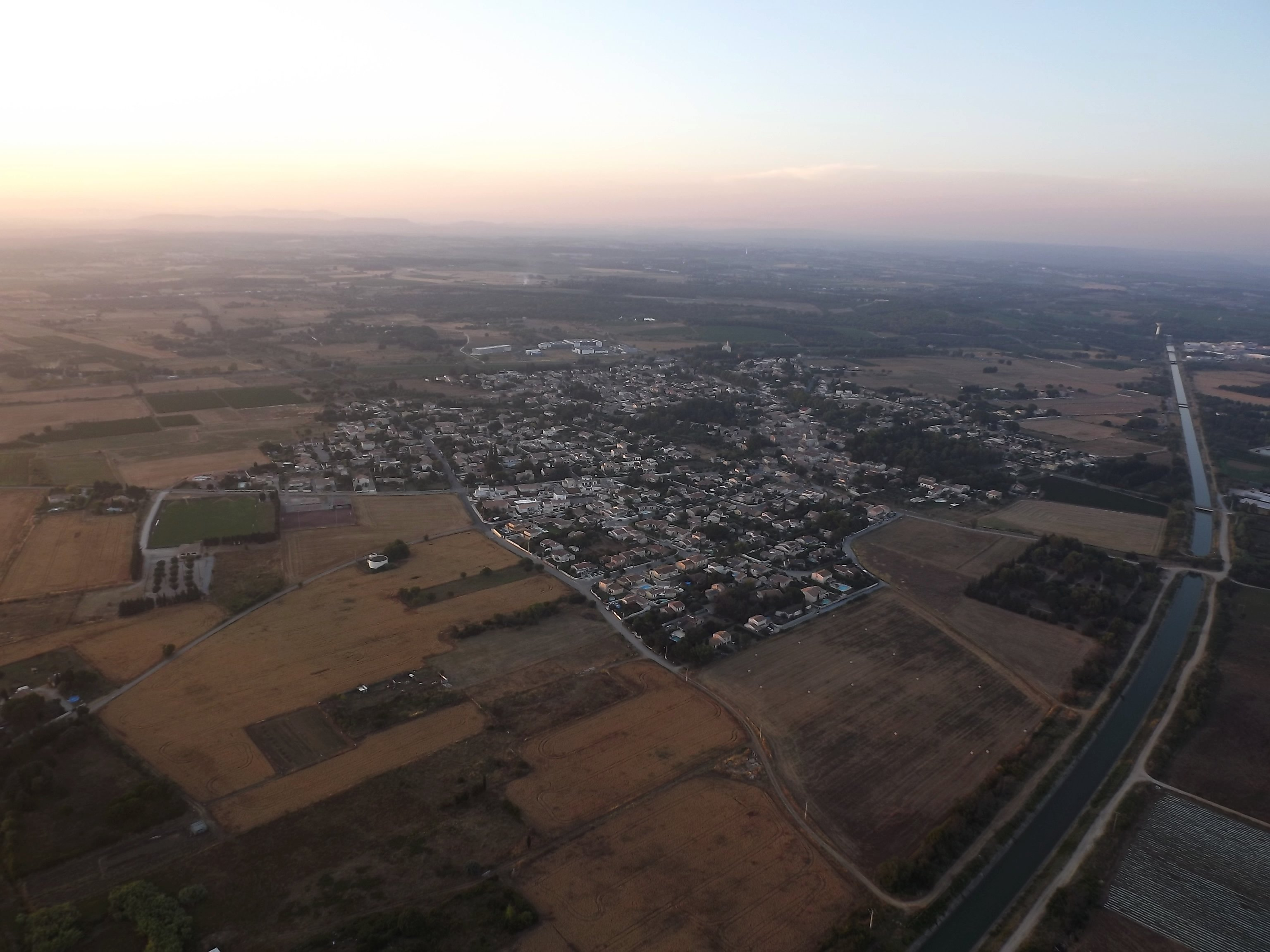
- An aerial view of Valergues

- Coat of arms
- Location of Valergues
- Location within France Location within Occitanie
- Coordinates: 43°40′07″N 4°03′45″E
- Country: France
- Region: Occitania
- Department: Hérault
- Arrondissement: Montpellier
- Canton: Mauguio
- Intercommunality: CA Pays de l'Or

Government
  - Mayor (2023–2026): Gérard Ligora
- Area^{1}: 5.2 km^{2} (2.0 sq mi)
- Elevation: 18 m (59 ft)
- Highest elevation: 41 m (135 ft)
- Lowest elevation: 9 m (30 ft)
- Population (2023): 2,238
  - Density: 430/km^{2} (1,100/sq mi)
- Time zone: UTC+01:00 (CET)
  - Summer (DST): UTC+02:00 (CEST)
- INSEE/Postal code: 34321 /34130
- ^{1} French Land Register data, which excludes lakes, ponds, glaciers > 1 km^{2} (0.386 sq mi or 247 acres) and river estuaries.

Valergues (French pronunciation: [valɛʁɡ]; Occitan: Valèrgues) is a commune in the Hérault department in the Occitanie region in southern France. Valergues-Lansargues station has rail connections to Narbonne, Montpellier and Avignon.

== Population ==
Historical population
Year	Pop.	±% p.a.
1968	390	—
1975	411	+0.75%
1982	575	+4.91%
1990	936	+6.28%
1999	1,740	+7.13%
2007	1,967	+1.54%
2012	2,035	+0.68%
2017	2,071	+0.35%
2023	2,238	+1.30%
Source: INSEE

== See also ==
- Communes of the Hérault department
