= Saint-Aunès =

- Commune
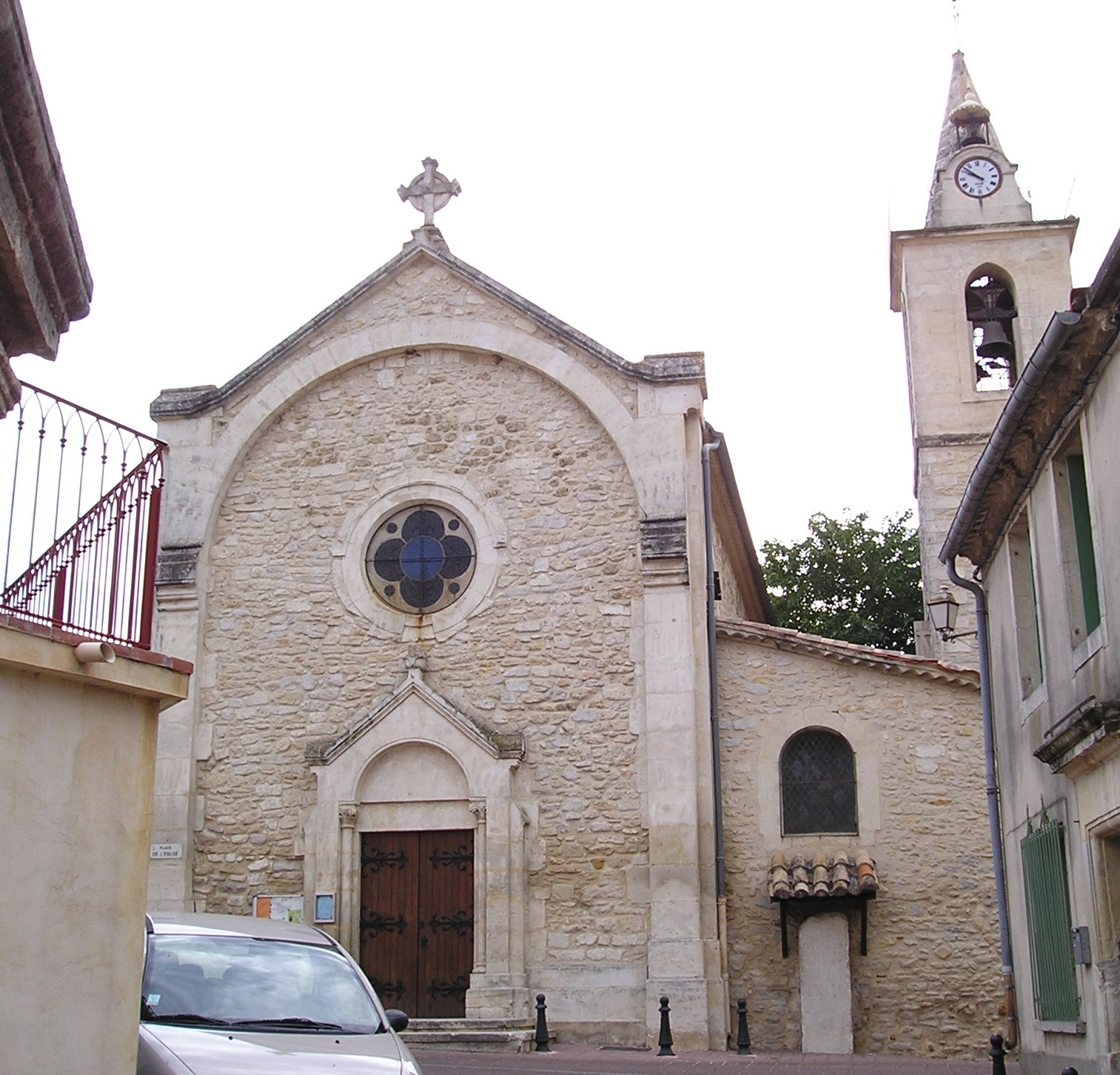
- The church of Saint-Aunès

- Coat of arms
- Location of Saint-Aunès
- Location within France Location within Occitanie
- Coordinates: 43°38′27″N 3°57′57″E
- Country: France
- Region: Occitania
- Department: Hérault
- Arrondissement: Montpellier
- Canton: Mauguio
- Intercommunality: CA Pays de l'Or

Government
  - Mayor (2020–2026): Alain Hugues
- Area^{1}: 12.32 km^{2} (4.76 sq mi)
- Highest elevation: 60 m (200 ft)
- Lowest elevation: 13 m (43 ft)
- Population (2023): 4,530
  - Density: 368/km^{2} (952/sq mi)
- Time zone: UTC+01:00 (CET)
  - Summer (DST): UTC+02:00 (CEST)
- INSEE/Postal code: 34240 /34130
- ^{1} French Land Register data, which excludes lakes, ponds, glaciers > 1 km^{2} (0.386 sq mi or 247 acres) and river estuaries.

Saint-Aunès (French pronunciation: [sɛ̃.t‿onɛs]; Occitan: Sant Aunès) is a commune in the Hérault department in the Occitanie region in southern France. Saint-Aunès station has rail connections to Narbonne, Montpellier and Avignon.

== Population ==
Historical population
Year	Pop.	±% p.a.
1968	525	—
1975	536	+0.30%
1982	1,162	+11.69%
1990	2,027	+7.20%
1999	2,825	+3.76%
2007	3,013	+0.81%
2012	3,042	+0.19%
2017	3,439	+2.48%
2023	4,530	+4.70%
Source: INSEE

== See also ==
- Communes of the Hérault department
