= Lansargues =

- Commune
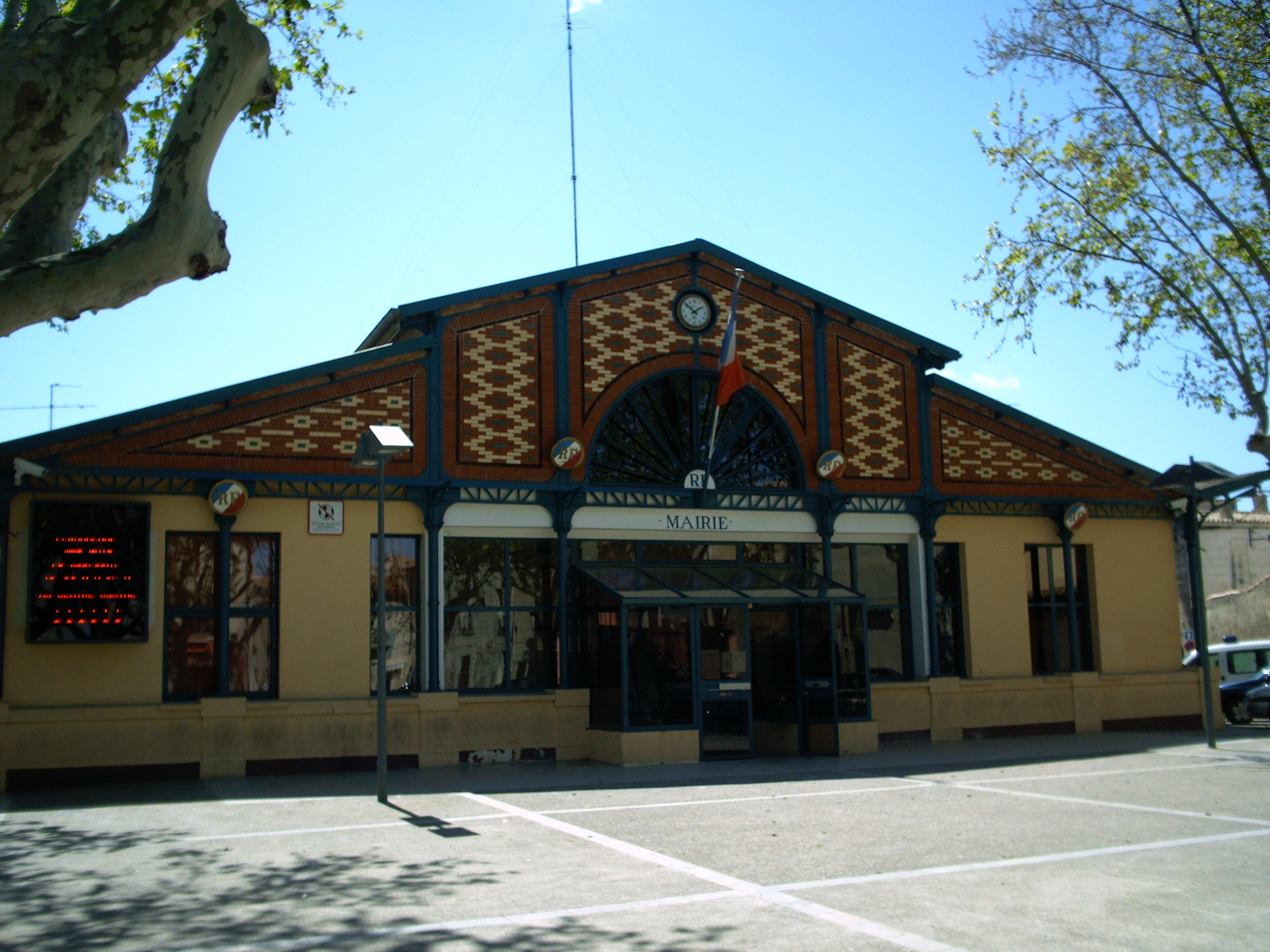
- Town hall

- Coat of arms
- Location of Lansargues
- Location within France Location within Occitanie
- Coordinates: 43°39′09″N 4°04′25″E
- Country: France
- Region: Occitania
- Department: Hérault
- Arrondissement: Montpellier
- Canton: Mauguio
- Intercommunality: CA Pays de l'Or

Government
  - Mayor (2020–2026): Michel Carlier
- Area^{1}: 18.39 km^{2} (7.10 sq mi)
- Elevation: 9 m (30 ft)
- Highest elevation: 16 m (52 ft)
- Lowest elevation: 0 m (0 ft)
- Population (2023): 3,233
  - Density: 175.8/km^{2} (455.3/sq mi)
- Time zone: UTC+01:00 (CET)
  - Summer (DST): UTC+02:00 (CEST)
- INSEE/Postal code: 34127 /34130
- ^{1} French Land Register data, which excludes lakes, ponds, glaciers > 1 km^{2} (0.386 sq mi or 247 acres) and river estuaries.

Lansargues (French pronunciation: [lɑ̃saʁɡ]; Occitan: Lançargues) is a commune in the Hérault département in the Occitanie region in southern France.

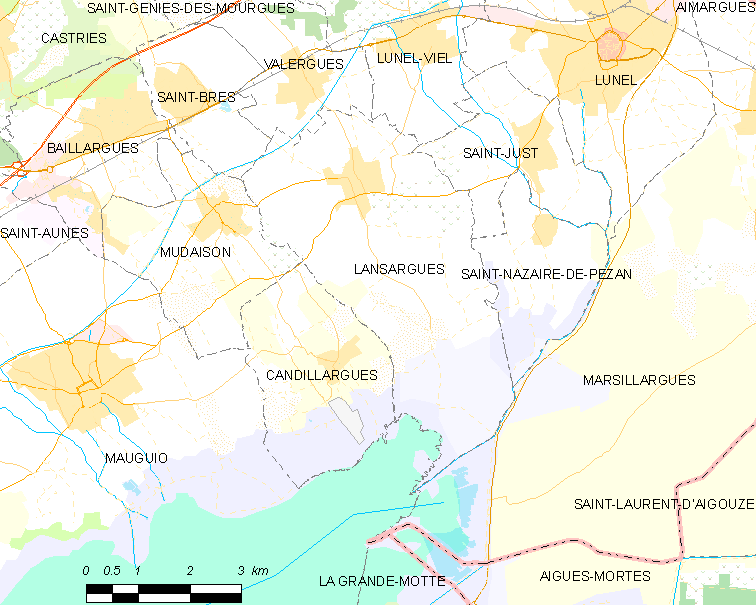
Map

== Population ==
Historical population
Year	Pop.	±% p.a.
1968	1,504	—
1975	1,380	−1.22%
1982	1,704	+3.06%
1990	2,130	+2.83%
1999	2,491	+1.75%
2007	2,619	+0.63%
2012	2,876	+1.89%
2017	3,112	+1.59%
2023	3,233	+0.64%
Source: INSEE

== See also ==
- Communes of the Hérault department
