= Phare de la méditerranée =

Coordinates: 43°31′44″N 3°55′56″E

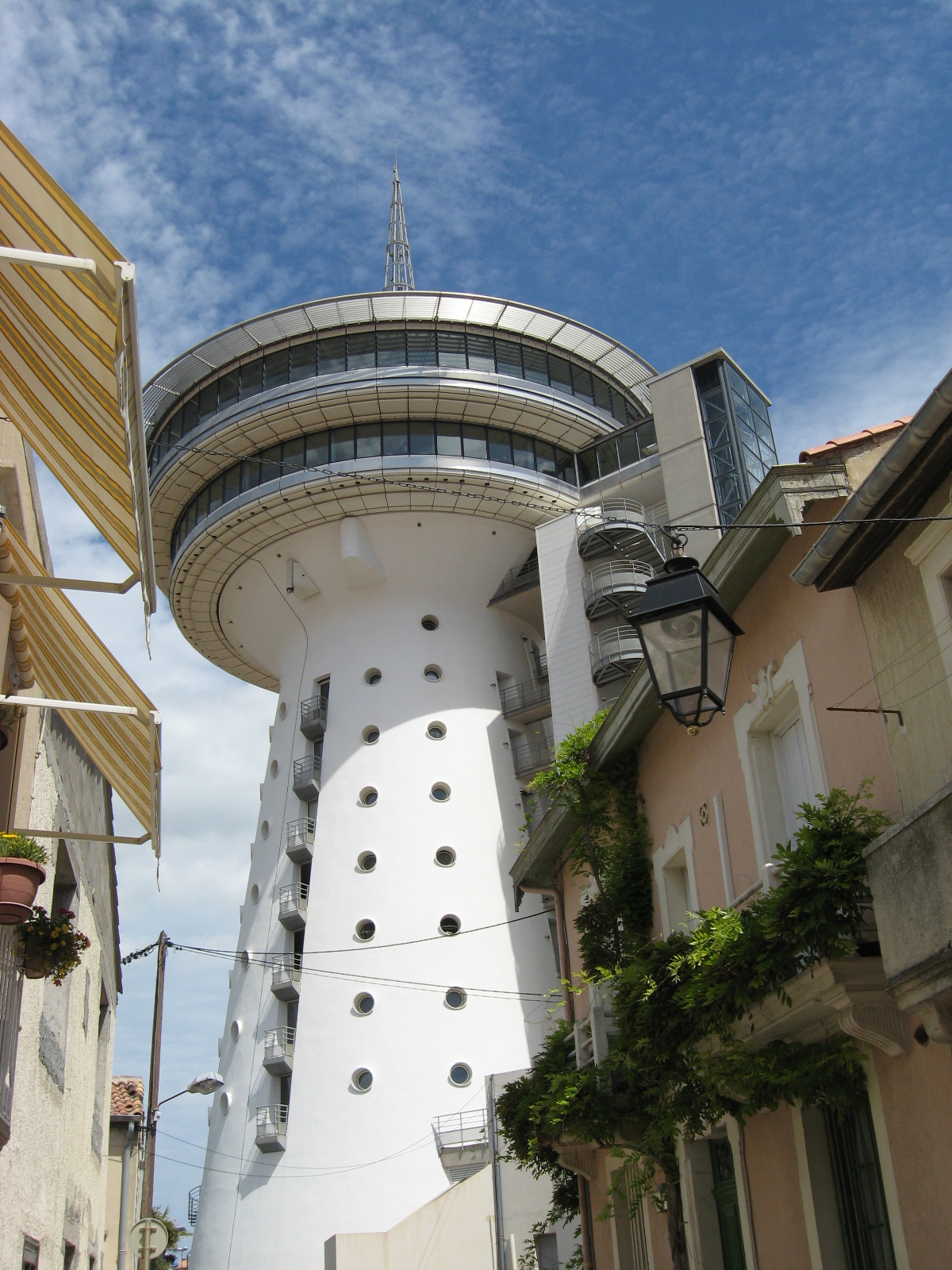

The Phare de la méditerranée is an observation tower with a revolving restaurant 45 metres above ground at Palavas-les-Flots in France. It was built in 1943 as a water tower.

== See also ==
- List of towers
