= Mauguio =

- Commune
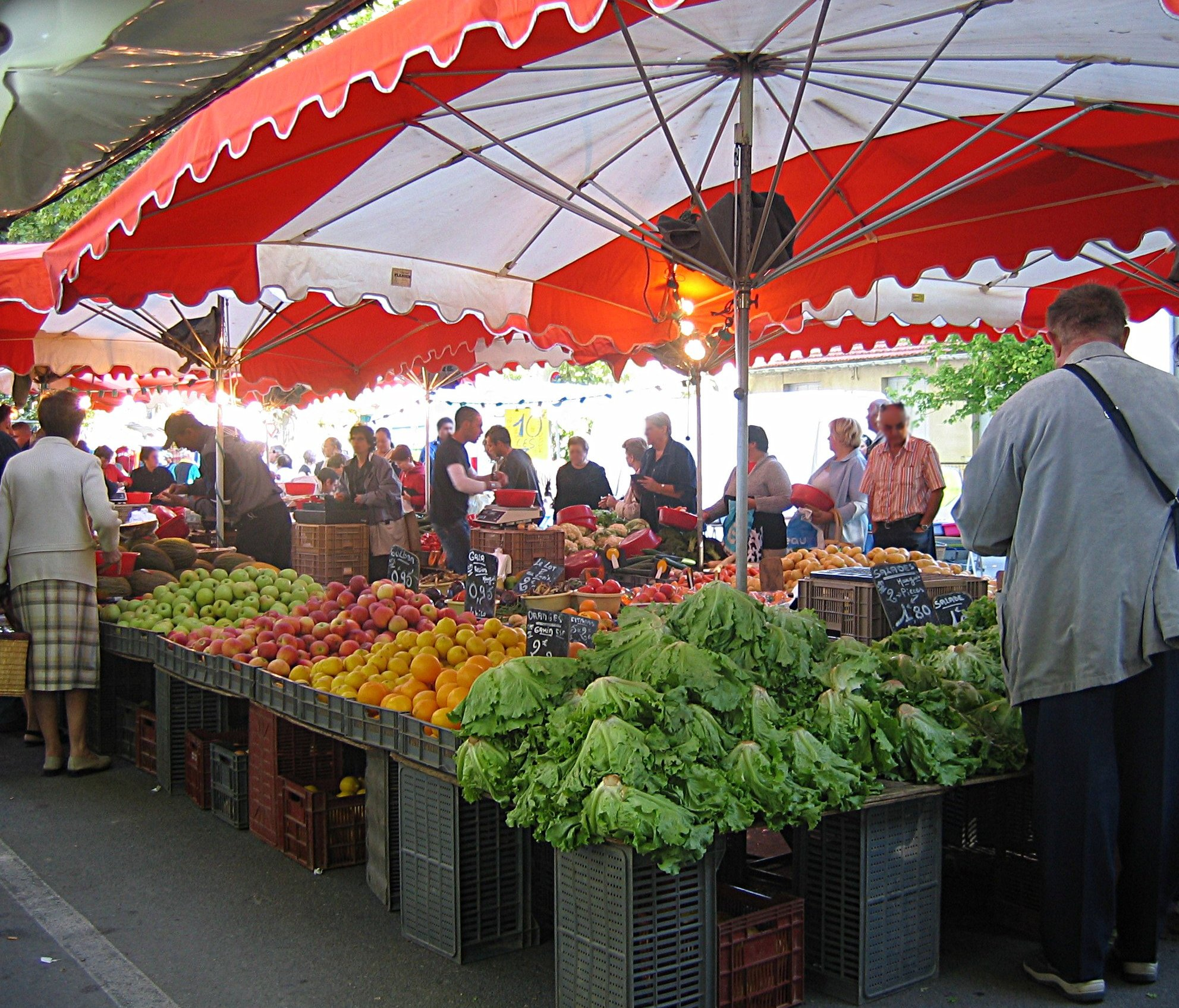
- Market

- Coat of arms
- Location of Mauguio
- Location within France Location within Occitanie
- Coordinates: 43°37′01″N 4°00′30″E
- Country: France
- Region: Occitania
- Department: Hérault
- Arrondissement: Montpellier
- Canton: Mauguio
- Intercommunality: CA Pays de l'Or

Government
  - Mayor (2020–2026): Yvon Bourrel
- Area^{1}: 112.25 km^{2} (43.34 sq mi)
- Elevation: 3 m (9.8 ft)
- Highest elevation: 51 m (167 ft)
- Lowest elevation: 0 m (0 ft)
- Population (2023): 16,522
  - Density: 147.19/km^{2} (381.22/sq mi)
- Time zone: UTC+01:00 (CET)
  - Summer (DST): UTC+02:00 (CEST)
- INSEE/Postal code: 34154 /34130
- ^{1} French Land Register data, which excludes lakes, ponds, glaciers > 1 km^{2} (0.386 sq mi or 247 acres) and river estuaries.

Mauguio (French pronunciation: [moɡjo]; Occitan: Mauguiò, primarily Melguelh) is a commune in the Hérault department in southern France.

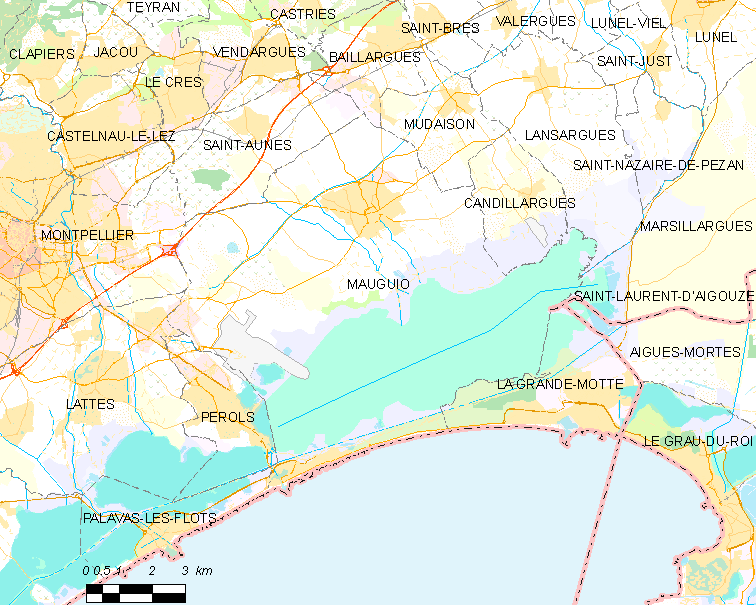
Map

== History ==
The city of Mauguio, seventh city of the Herault department and chief town of the district, is located 11 km east of Montpellier.

The altitude of the village is between 4 and 6 meters above sea level, the mont is a raised net peaking at more than 20 meters. This anomaly cannot receive any explanation from a geological point of view, because it is indeed a totally artificial relief created by the lords of the region, the Lords of Melgueil, to establish their castle.

The city of Mauguio has a rich history, since in the Middle Ages, it was the first Melgueil medieval city of Lower Languedoc, where the origin of the name of its inhabitants: the Melgoriens.

Mauguio is also home to one of the largest Spanish communities in France.

The city covers 7500 hectares, of which nearly 2,500 are occupied by the lagoon Étang de l'Or and 3,500 hectares are occupied by fertile land, orchards and vineyards, as the city has expanded in the early twentieth century with viticulture.

Étang de l'Or covers about 30% of the territory. This site is recognized wetland of national importance. "Beautiful and typical residence for birds, it has a rich fauna and a really diverse flora. With Huts Salting and many other places to discover, it is part of an exceptional natural heritage. The territory offers outstanding farmland, preserved prodigal. He plays the role of Montpellier's garden, its market gardens supplying the basin montpelliéran with asparagus, cantaloupes, strawberries...and many other crops.

The resort of Carnon, its coastal strip and the marina, make it a popular summer tourist destination. The six miles of protected dunes and beaches are renowned for the quality of their sand and water. The marina is growing in reputation. On its banks, every night, you can participate in summer activities that extend late into the season and start in the spring.

Another important asset of the city, the Montpellier-Méditerranée International Airport, which result on a vast network of communication and modernity.

North-east of the city, the BIA Louvade is another growing area. Many craft enterprises settled there and boost the economy.

Mauguio, with its cultural and social life, its sports, its youth, diversified agriculture, its shops and typical markets, has many other resources.

== Population ==
Historical population

Year	Pop.	±% p.a.
1793	1,566	—
1800	1,435	−1.24%
1806	1,558	+1.38%
1821	1,719	+0.66%
1831	1,701	−0.11%
1836	1,993	+3.22%
1841	2,131	+1.35%
1846	2,430	+2.66%
1851	2,074	−3.12%
1856	2,305	+2.13%
1861	2,550	+2.04%
1866	2,663	+0.87%
1872	2,578	−0.54%
1876	2,212	−3.76%
1881	1,942	−2.57%
1886	2,159	+2.14%
1891	2,513	+3.08%
1896	2,667	+1.20%
1901	2,910	+1.76%

Year	Pop.	±% p.a.
1906	2,831	−0.55%
1911	2,849	+0.13%
1921	3,212	+1.21%
1926	3,382	+1.04%
1931	3,791	+2.31%
1936	3,706	−0.45%
1946	3,372	−0.94%
1954	3,504	+0.48%
1962	3,776	+0.94%
1968	4,350	+2.39%
1975	5,595	+3.66%
1982	9,791	+8.32%
1990	11,487	+2.02%
1999	14,847	+2.89%
2007	15,567	+0.59%
2012	16,786	+1.52%
2017	16,919	+0.16%
2023	16,522	−0.39%

Source: EHESS and INSEE (1968-2023)

== Transportation ==
The airport of Montpellier-Méditerranée Airport is located in the area of Fréjorgues in the town of Mauguio.

== Tourism ==
The seaside resort of Carnon or Carnon-Plage is located on the territory of the commune.

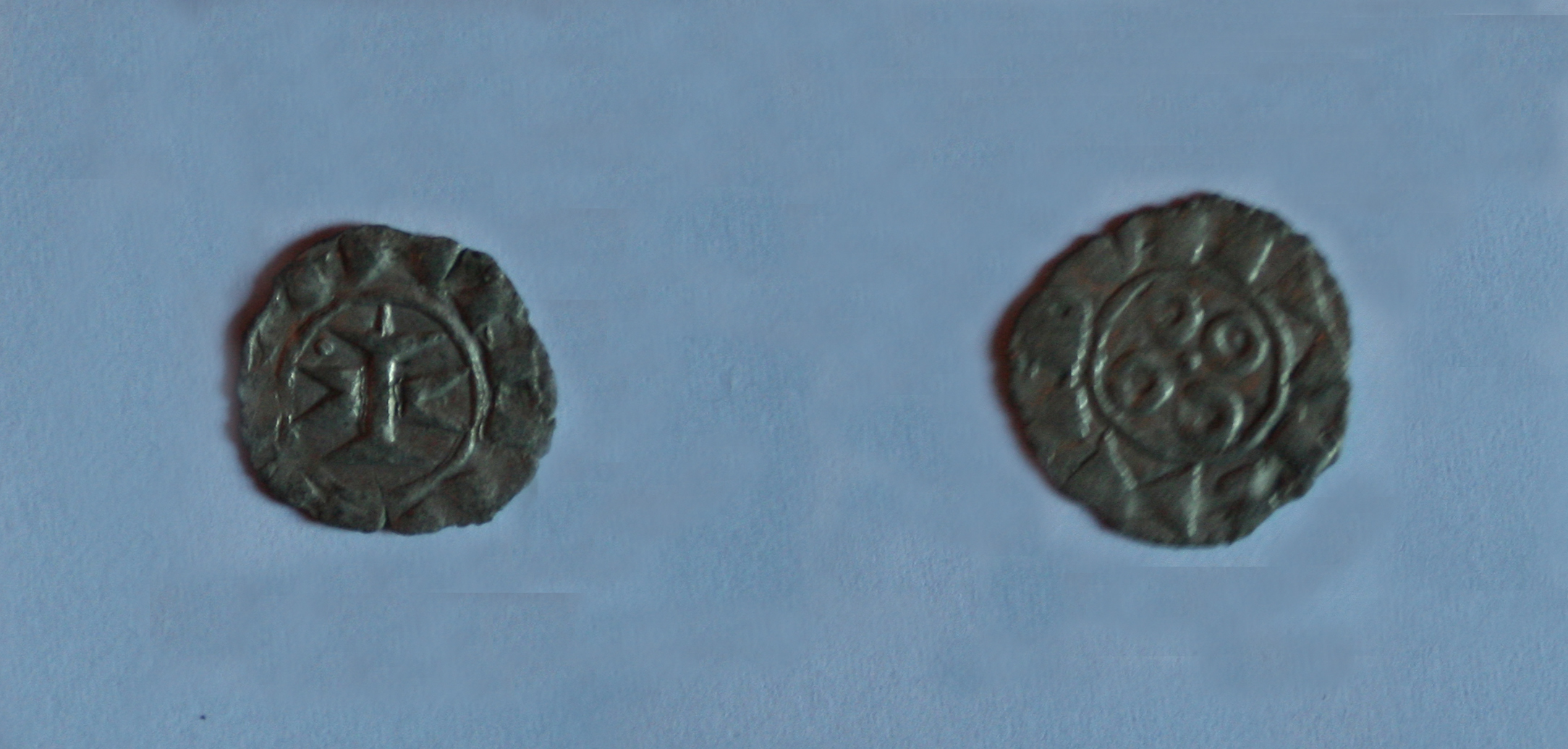
Denier melgorien

== See also ==
- Communes of the Hérault department
