= Canton of Montpellier-4 =

Coordinates: 43.59°N 3.87°E

Montpellier-4
- Canton
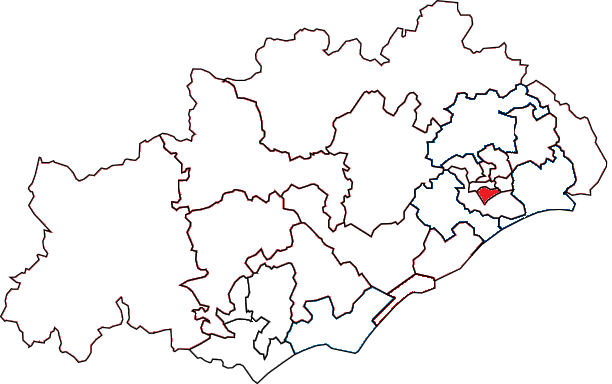
- Interactive map of Montpellier-4
- Country: France
- Region: Occitania
- Department: Hérault
- No. of communes: {{{nbcomm}}}

Government
  - Representatives (2021–2028): Jean Almarcha; Corinne Gournay Garcia
- Population (2023): 70,440
- INSEE code: 34 18

The canton of Montpellier-4 is an administrative division of the Hérault department, southern France. Its borders were modified at the French canton reorganisation which came into effect in March 2015. Its seat is in Montpellier.

== Composition ==
It consists of the following communes:

1. Montpellier (partly)

== Councillors ==
Election	Councillors	Party	Occupation
2015	Patricia Mirallès	DVG	Councillor of Montpellier
2015	Philippe Sorez	DVG	Sales executive
2017	Manare Khali	LREM	Educator within the Legal Protection of Youth
2021	Jean Almarcha	PS	Retired college professor
2021	Corinne Gournay Garcia	PCF	Biologist at the Montpellier University Hospital

- Following Patricia Mirallès's election as a Member of the National Assembly in 2017, her substitute, Manare Khali, replaces her in Departmental council of Hérault.
