= Philippe Huppé =

French politician

Member of the National Assembly for Hérault's 5th constituency
- In office 21 June 2017 – June 2022
- Preceded by: Kléber Mesquida

Personal details
- Born: 12 February 1968 (age 58) Mazamet, France
- Party: La République En Marche!

Philippe Huppé (born 12 February 1968) is a French politician of La République En Marche! who served as member of the French National Assembly from 2017 to 2022, representing the department of Hérault.

Huppé is a history teacher and author, having written several books, such as The Most Beautiful Legends of Occitania - The Herault of the Legends.

He lost his seat in the first round of the 2022 French legislative election.
