= Hérault's 5th constituency =

Constituency of the National Assembly of France

5th constituency of Hérault
- inline Constituency of the National Assembly of France

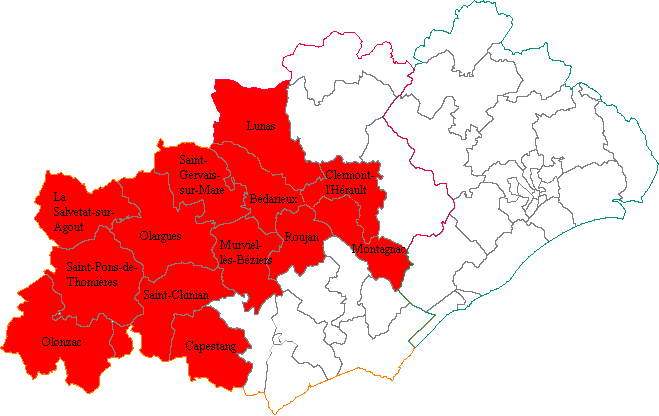

- Location of Hérault in France
- Deputy: Stéphanie Galzy; RN
- Department: Hérault
- Cantons: (pre-2015) Bédarieux, Capestang, Clermont-l'Hérault, Lunas, Montagnac, Murviel-lès-Béziers, Olargues, Olonzac, Roujan, Saint-Chinian, Saint-Gervais-sur-Mare, Saint-Pons-de-Thomières, La Salvetat-sur-Agout
- Registered voters: 94,240

The 5th constituency of Hérault is a French legislative constituency in the Hérault département.

== Deputies ==
Election	Member	Party
1988	Bernard Nayral	PS
1993	Marcel Roques	UDF
1997	Bernard Nayral	PS
2002	Kléber Mesquida	PS
2007	Kléber Mesquida	PS
2012	Kléber Mesquida	PS
2017	Philippe Huppé	LREM
2022	Stéphanie Galzy	RN
2024	Stéphanie Galzy	RN

== Election results ==
=== 2024 ===
Candidate	Party	Alliance	First round			Second round		
Candidate	Party	Alliance	Votes	%	+/–	Votes	%	+/–
Stéphanie Galzy	RN		32,781	48.88	+20.75	36,171	55.36	+1.12
Aurélien Manenc	PS	NFP	21,640	32.27	+7.95	29,172	44.64	-1.12
Philippe Huppé	REN	Ensemble	9,369	13.97	-3.10			
Lilian Bourrie	REC		1,346	2.01	-2.25			
Rémy Groussard	DIV		1,121	1.67	new			
Véronique Chesnard	LO		809	1.21	+1.12			
Votes			67,066	100.00		65,343	100.00	
Valid votes			67,066	96.39	-1.53	65,343	93.55	+6.09
Blank votes			1,736	2.50	+1.04	3,296	4.72	-4.60
Null votes			776	1.12	+0.60	1,211	1.73	-1.50
Turnout			69,578	69.57	+18.93	69,850	69.84	+19.37
Abstentions			30,432	30.43	-18.93	30,168	30.16	-19.37
Registered voters			100,010			100,018		
Result			RN HOLD					

=== 2022 ===
Legislative Election 2022: Hérault's 5th constituency
Party	Candidate	Votes	%	±%
RN	Stéphanie Galzy	13,806	28.13	+6.05
LFI (NUPÉS)	Pierre Polard	11,932	24.32	-10.55
LREM (Ensemble)	Philippe Huppé	8,378	17.07	−11.49
PRG	Aurélien Manenc	7,713	15.72	N/A
REC	Richard Vinuesa	2,091	4.26	N/A
LR (UDC)	Lewis Marchand	1,364	2.78	−7.73
DVE	William Rouanet	1,209	2.46	N/A
DVD	Charles Salvaing	1,199	2.44	N/A
Others	N/A	1,379		
Turnout		50,113	50.64	+0.07
2nd round result
RN	Stéphanie Galzy	23,695	54.24	+12.60
LFI (NUPÉS)	Pierre Polard	19,990	45.76	N/A
Turnout		50,113	50.64	+6.22
RN gain from LREM				

=== 2017 ===
Candidate	Label	First round		Second round	
Candidate	Label	Votes	%	Votes	%
Philippe Huppé	REM	13,142	28.56	21,169	58.36
Gilles Ardinat	FN	10,160	22.08	15,107	41.64
Pierre Polard	FI	7,759	16.86		
Marie Passieux	PS	5,988	13.01		
Catherine Rouillé	LR	4,837	10.51		
Michel Capron	PCF	1,263	2.74		
William Rouanet	ECO	1,041	2.26		
Maria Goryainova	DIV	497	1.08		
Antonieta Araya	EXG	382	0.83		
Sybille Saint Girons	DIV	310	0.67		
Cédric Suzanne	ECO	240	0.52		
Ludovic Da Costa	DVG	234	0.51		
Hafid Atoug	DVG	170	0.37		
Votes		46,023	100.00	36,276	100.00
Valid votes		46,023	96.57	36,276	86.65
Blank votes		1,107	2.32	4,126	9.86
Null votes		528	1.11	1,461	3.49
Turnout		47,658	50.57	41,863	44.42
Abstentions		46,586	49.43	52,377	55.58
Registered voters		94,244		94,240	
Source: Ministry of the Interior

=== 2012 ===
2012 legislative election in Herault's 5th constituency
Candidate	Party	First round		Second round	
Candidate	Party	Votes	%	Votes	%
Kléber Mesquida	PS	22,319	40.98%	31,237	61.41%
Constance Calandri	FN	12,221	22.44%	19,631	38.59%
Catherine Cecchi	NC	9,148	16.80%		
Myriam Hubert	FG	5,672	10.42%		
Michèle Comps	EELV	2,169	3.98%		
Caroline Larmee	MoDem	822	1.51%		
Grégoire Annet	DLR	598	1.10%		
Jean-Yves Gavaland	AEI	435	0.80%		
Claude Trouve	MPF	332	0.61%		
Morgane Lachiver	LO	302	0.55%		
Maryse Launais	POI	290	0.53%		
Carole Neri		151	0.28%		
Valid votes		54,459	98.04%	50,868	93.66%
Spoilt and null votes		1,088	1.96%	3,445	6.34%
Votes cast / turnout		55,547	61.06%	54,313	59.73%
Abstentions		35,430	38.94%	36,624	40.27%
Registered voters		90,977	100.00%	90,937	100.00%

=== 2007 ===
Legislative Election 2007: Hérault's 5th constituency
Party	Candidate	Votes	%	±%
UMP	Marcel Roques	22,955	37.48	
PS	Kléber Mesquida	19,356	31.61	
FN	Myriam Roques	3,970	6.48	
PCF	Jean-Louis Bousquet	3,952	6.45	
MoDem	Guilhem Johannin	3,322	5.42	
CPNT	Joseph Mestre	1,817	2.97	
LV	Michèle Comps	1,599	2.61	
Far left	Didier Ribo	1,527	2.49	
Others	N/A	2,740		
Turnout		62,499	65.27	
2nd round result
PS	Kléber Mesquida	32,398	52.31	
UMP	Marcel Roques	29,532	47.69	
Turnout		64,527	67.39	
PS hold				

=== 2002 ===
Legislative Election 2002: Hérault's 5th constituency
Party	Candidate	Votes	%	±%
PS	Kléber Mesquida	18,949	32.39	
UMP	Marcel Roques	17,627	30.13	
FN	Philippe Delmotte	9,237	15.79	
CPNT	Max Allies	5,382	9.20	
LCR	Danielle Le Dudal	1,486	2.54	
LV	Michele Comps	1,370	2.34	
LO	Francis Gonzalez	1,199	2.05	
Others	N/A	3,260		
Turnout		60,325	68.26	
2nd round result
PS	Kléber Mesquida	28,276	51.62	
UMP	Marcel Roques	26,503	48.38	
Turnout		58,340	66.02	
PS hold				

=== 1997 ===
Legislative Election 1997: Hérault's 5th constituency
Party	Candidate	Votes	%	±%
PS	Bernard Nayral	17,431	30.56	
UDF	Marcel Roques	15,173	26.60	
PCF	Jean-Louis Bousquet	9,784	17.15	
FN	Jacques Denis	9,157	16.06	
LV	Michelle Comps	2,175	3.81	
DVD	Laurent Palmier	1,204	2.11	
Others	N/A	2,111		
Turnout		59,791	72.53	
2nd round result
PS	Bernard Nayral	34,034	58.05	
UDF	Marcel Roques	24,595	41.95	
Turnout		62,747	23.87	
PS gain from UDF				

== Sources ==
- "Résultats électoraux officiels en France" (in French). 2017.
- French Interior Ministry results website: "Résultats électoraux officiels en France" (in French).
