= Hérault =

Department in Occitanie, France

Hérault Erau (Occitan)
- Department of France
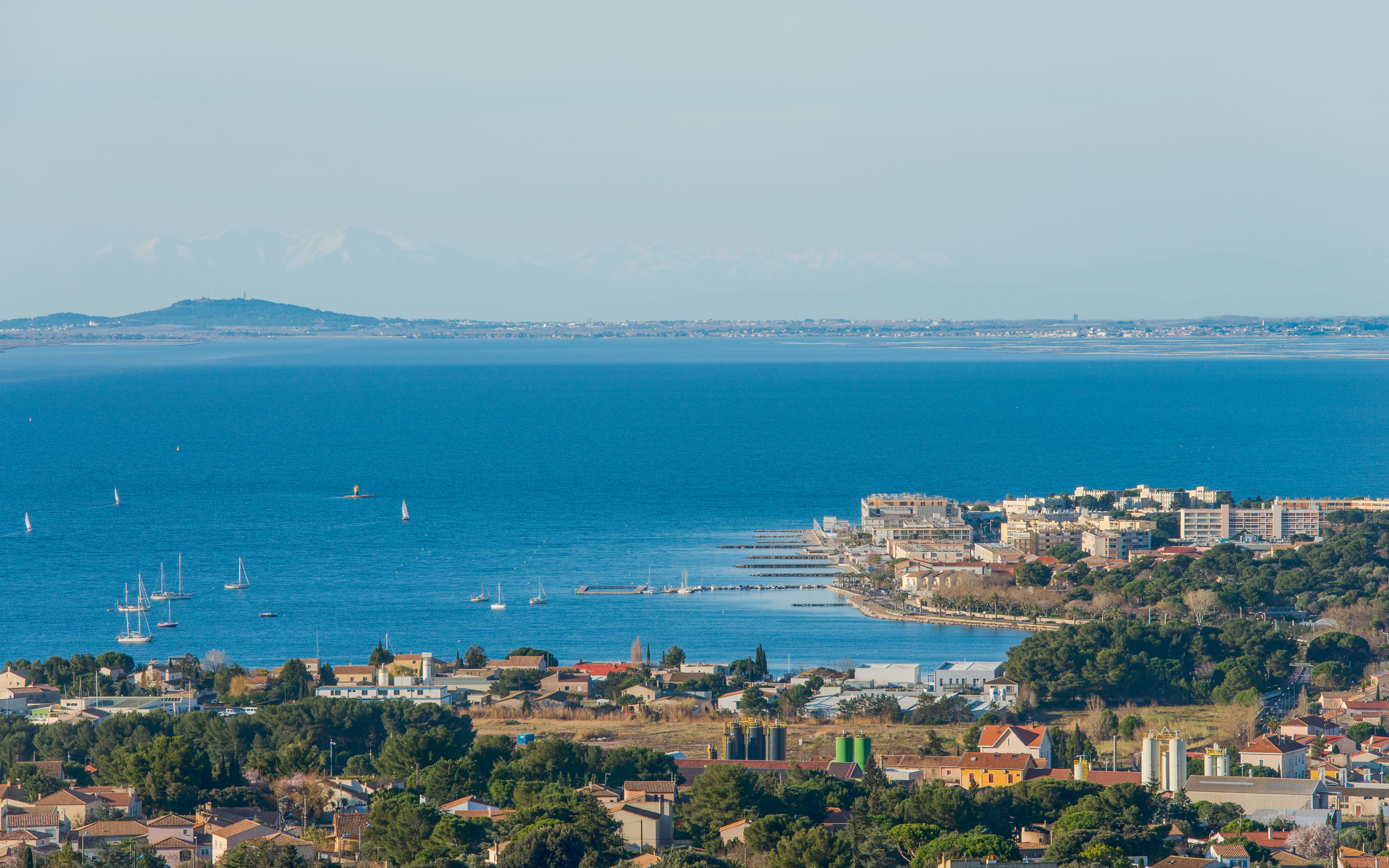
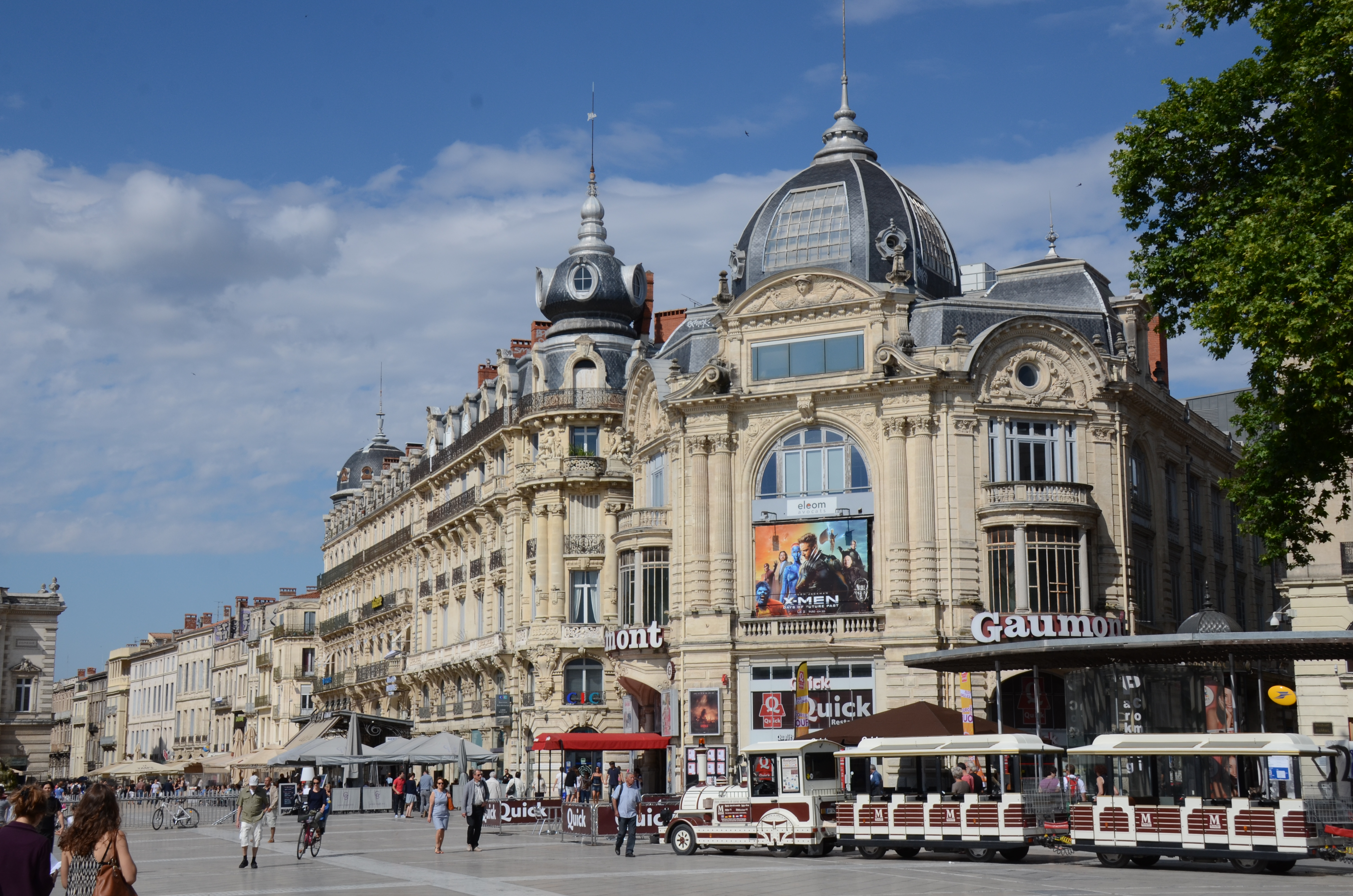
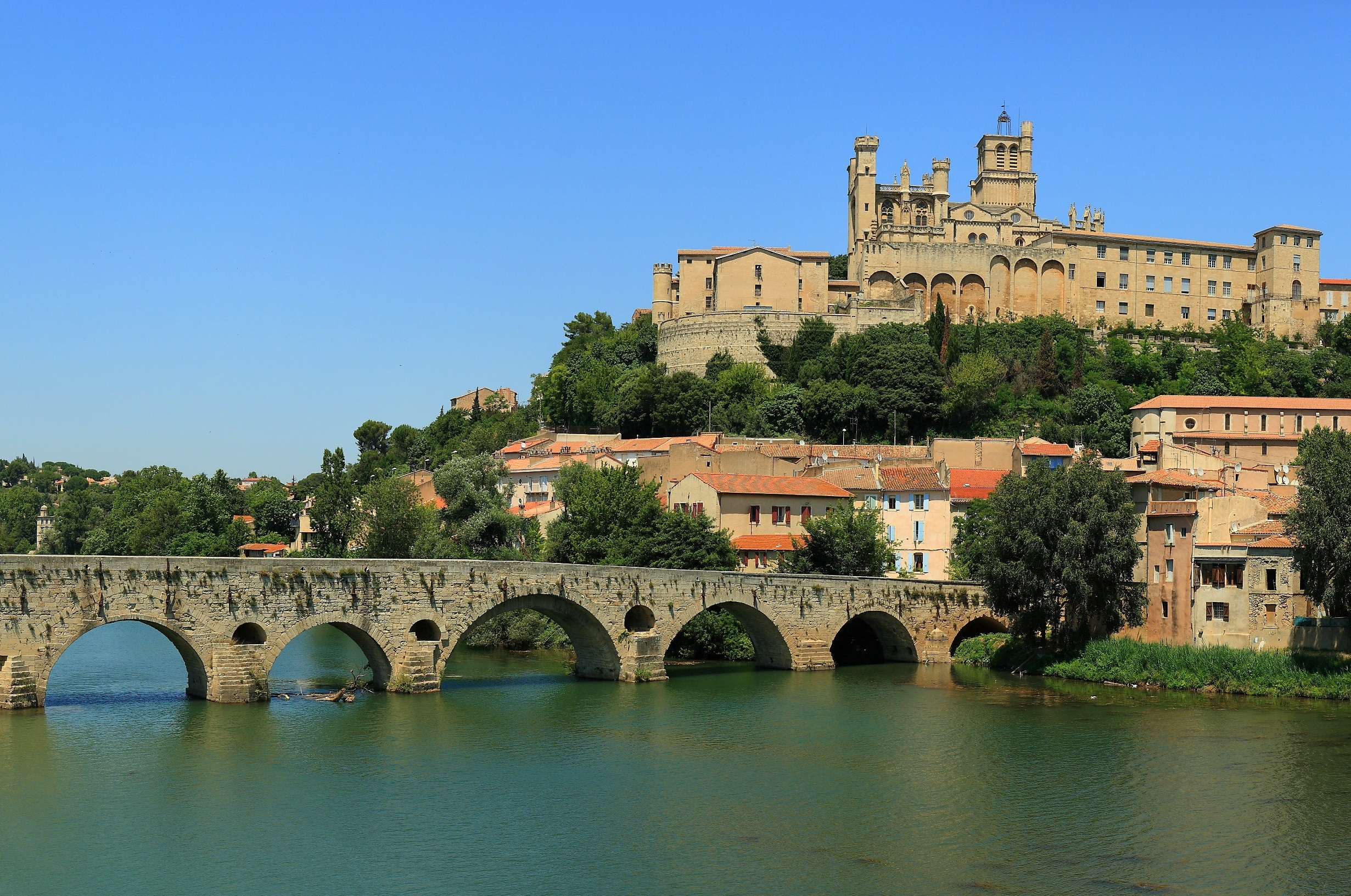
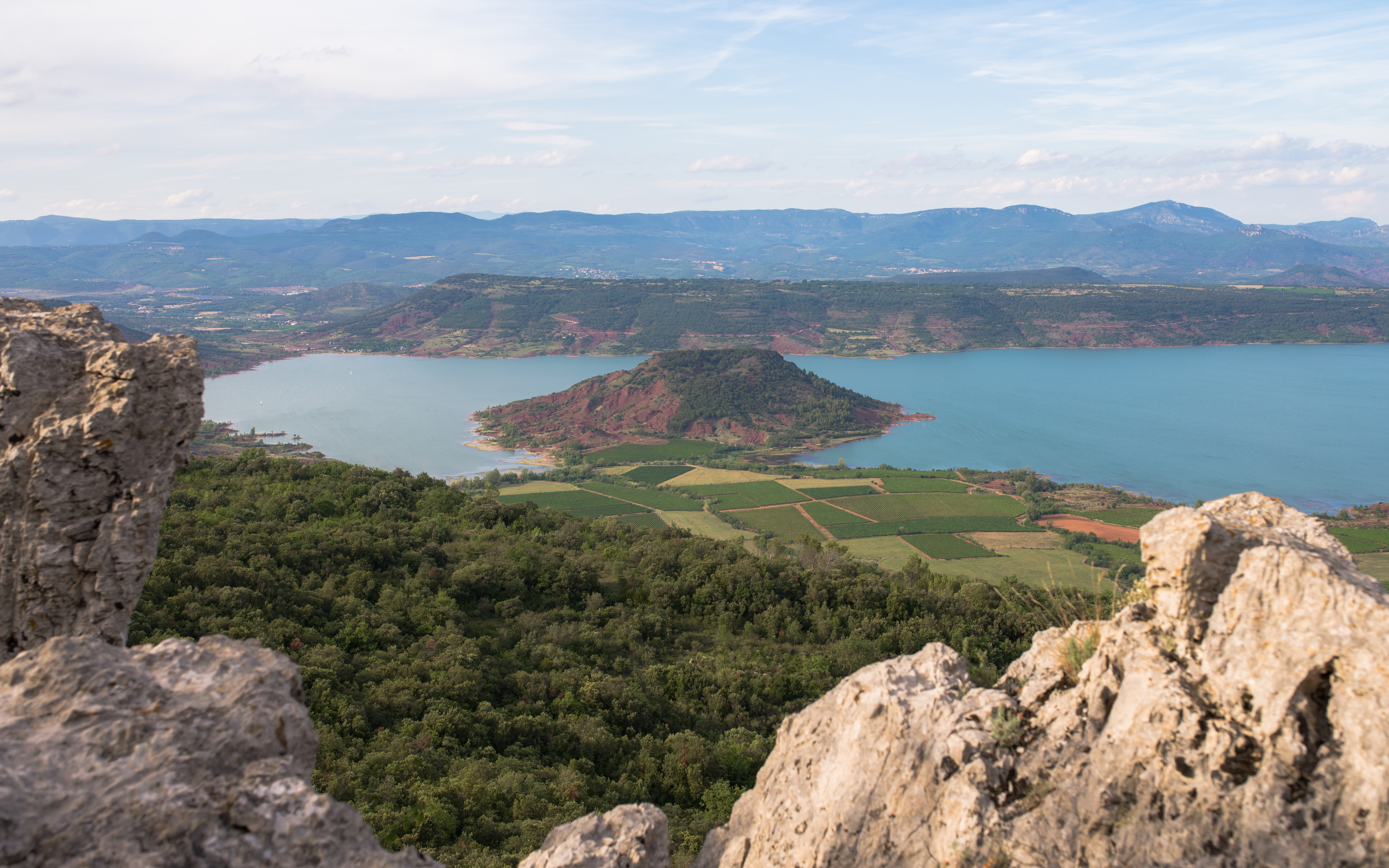
- From top down, left to right: Mediterranean coast, Place de la Comédie in Montpellier, Béziers and Liausson's view of Salagou Lake

- Flag Coat of arms

- Location of Hérault in France
- Coordinates: 43°21′N 3°13′E
- Country: France
- Region: Occitanie
- Prefecture: Montpellier
- Subprefectures: Béziers; Lodève

Government
  - President of the Departmental Council: Kléber Mesquida (PS)

Area^{1}
  - Total: 6,224 km^{2} (2,403 sq mi)

Population (2023)
  - Total: 1,230,289
  - Rank: 18th
  - Density: 197.7/km^{2} (512.0/sq mi)
- Demonym: Héraultais
- Time zone: UTC+1 (CET)
  - Summer (DST): UTC+2 (CEST)
- ISO 3166 code: FR-34
- Department number: 34
- Arrondissements: 3
- Constituency: 9
- Cantons: 25
- Intercommunality: 16
- Communes: 341
- ^1 French Land Register data, which exclude estuaries, and lakes, ponds, and glaciers larger than 1 km^{2}

Hérault (French pronunciation: [eʁo]; Occitan: Erau, [eˈɾaw]) is a department of the region of Occitania, Southern France. Named after the river Hérault, its prefecture is Montpellier. It had a population of 1,230,289 in 2023.

== History ==
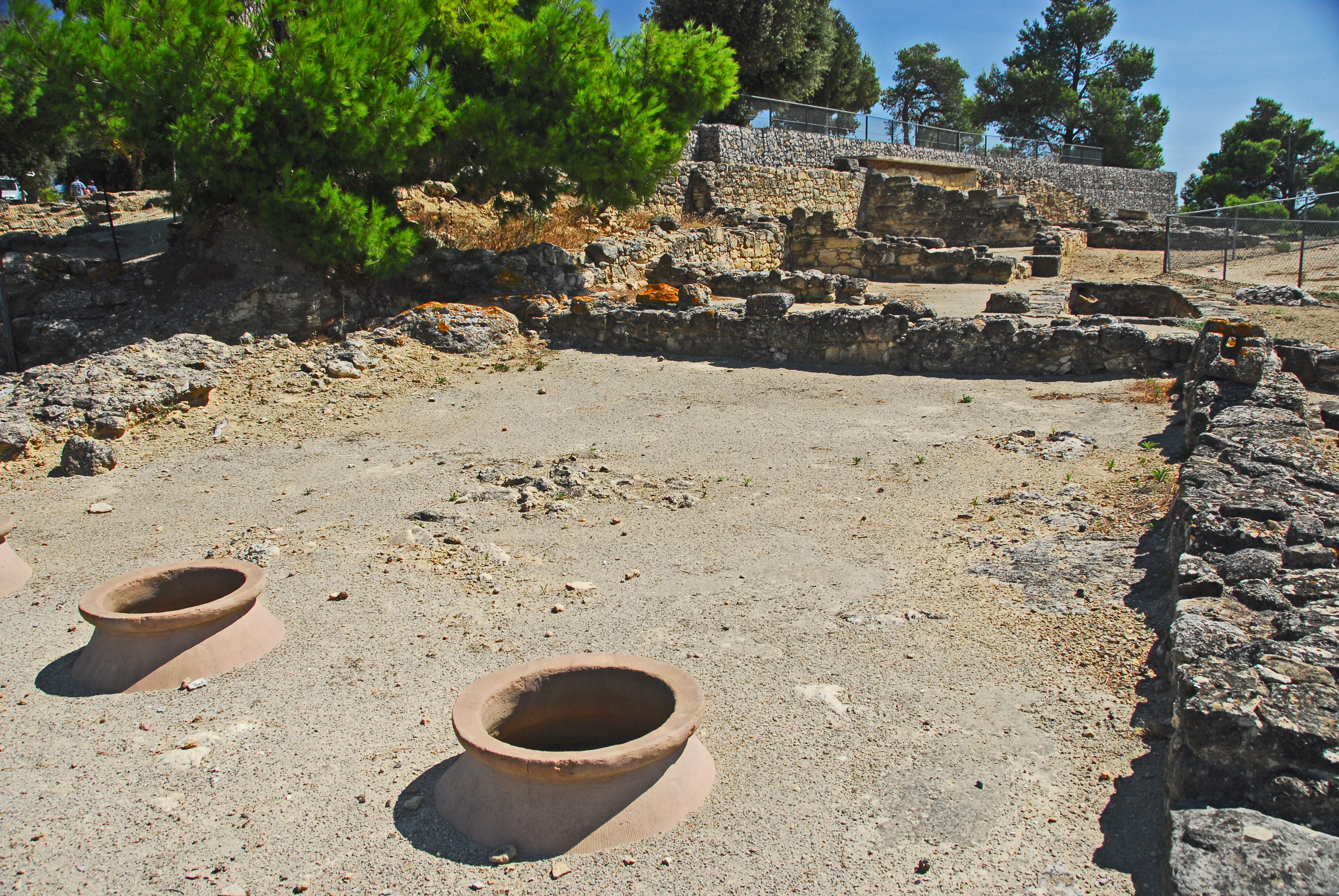
Oppidum d'Ensérune

Hérault is one of the original 83 departments created during the French Revolution on 4 March 1790. It was created from part of the former province of Languedoc.

At the beginning of the 20th century, viticulture in the wine-growing region was devastated by a slump in sales combined with disease affecting the vines. Thousands of small scale producers revolted. This revolt was suppressed very harshly by the government of Georges Clemenceau.

The catastrophic frost of the winter of 1956 damaged the olive trees, and the olive-growing regions did not recover until the late 1980s. Many of the olive-industry co-ops closed.

During the second half of the twentieth century the Montpellier basin saw some of the most rapid population growth in France.

== Geography ==
Hérault is part of the region of Occitanie and is surrounded by the departments of Aude, Tarn, Aveyron, Gard, and the Mediterranean (Gulf of Lion) on the south. The department is geographically very diverse, with beaches in the south, the Cévennes mountains in the north, and agricultural land in between. The territory of Hérault is often described as an open amphitheater facing the sea. The geography of Hérault is marked by the diversity of its geology and its landscapes. These range from the southern foothills of the Massif Central, to the Mediterranean Sea, through the areas of garrigue and the low plain of Languedoc wine. Hérault has a Mediterranean climate.

The minimum elevation is at sea level and the highest point of the department is at an elevation of 1181m in one of the peaks of the Espinouse. The average elevation is about 227m.

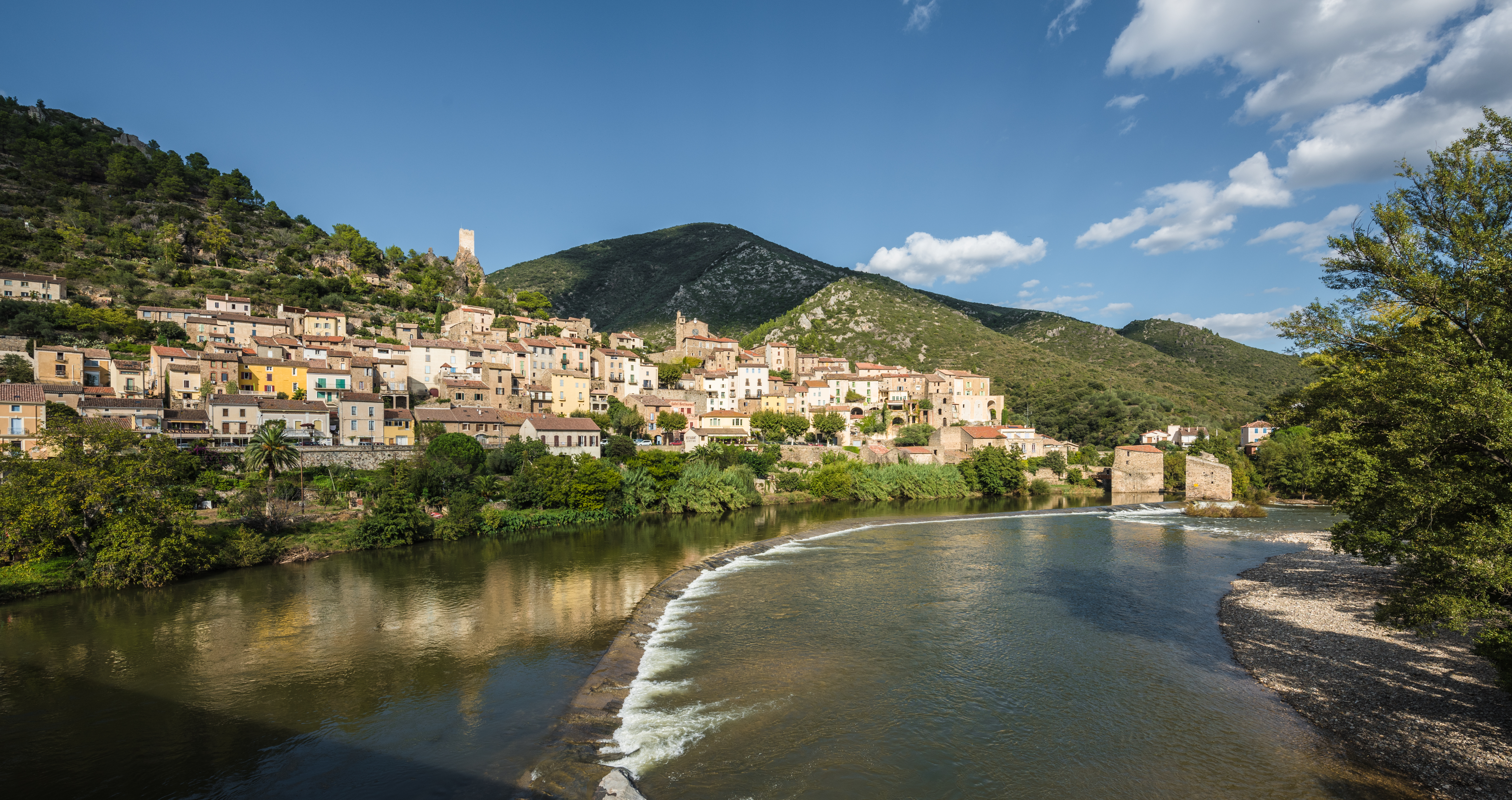
View of the Orb River in Roquebrun

The department of Hérault is crossed by several rivers that originate in the southern foothills of the Massif Central and empty into the Mediterranean Sea, flowing more-or-less from north to south over a relatively short distance from high elevation. The main rivers flowing from west to east are the Vidourle, which marks the limit with the Gard department; the Lez, which flows through Montpellier; the Hérault, which gave its name to the department, and the Orb, which flows through Béziers. To the west, the Aude, a 224 km-long river flowing from the Pyrenees, has a course oriented west–east and marks the boundary between Hérault and the neighbouring department of Aude. These rivers as well as their tributaries take their character from the region's 'cévénol' climate, with sudden variations of flow causing sudden floods. Lagoons are found along the coast of Herault, the largest of which is the Étang de Thau, with an area of about 7,500 hectares.

The hinterland of the lowlands of Bas-Languedoc is gradually hilly. It is the territory of the vineyard, olive groves, orchards and scrubland. Olive growing and viticulture symbolize an important part of the Mediterranean heritage and lifestyle.

The area of Hérault near the town of Lodève is the geographical antipode point of Chatham Island off the east coast of New Zealand.

=== Principal towns ===
The most populous commune is Montpellier, the prefecture. The least populated municipality is Romiguières with 24 inhabitants in 2023. As of 2023, there are 7 communes with more than 20,000 inhabitants:

Commune	Population (2023)
Montpellier	310,240
Béziers	81,545
Sète	45,337
Agde	29,939
Lunel	26,623
Castelnau-le-Lez	26,058
Frontignan	24,136

=== Climate ===
The vast majority of the department can be characterized as a Mediterranean climate. However, the mountainous areas of the northwest have an oceanic influence. Some sectors of northern Herault have a temperate continental influence.

The average temperature of the summer months is close to the maximum French average. Nevertheless, the sea protects the coastal areas from the extremes of heat waves in summer, but also frosts in winter. They range from about 27 degrees Celsius on the seashore to 32 degrees Celsius inland. Mean minimum temperatures also vary, ranging from about 19 degrees Celsius on the coast to 15 degrees Celsius in the interior.

== Demographics ==
The inhabitants of the department are called Héraultais in French. Population development since 1791:

Historical population

Year	Pop.	±% p.a.
1791	290,126	—
1801	275,449	−0.52%
1806	299,882	+1.71%
1821	324,126	+0.52%
1831	346,207	+0.66%
1841	367,343	+0.59%
1851	389,286	+0.58%
1861	409,391	+0.50%
1872	429,878	+0.44%
1881	441,527	+0.30%
1891	461,012	+0.43%
1901	489,421	+0.60%
1911	480,484	−0.18%
1921	488,215	+0.16%

Year	Pop.	±% p.a.
1931	514,819	+0.53%
1936	502,043	−0.50%
1946	461,100	−0.85%
1954	471,429	+0.28%
1962	516,658	+1.15%
1968	591,397	+2.28%
1975	648,202	+1.32%
1982	706,499	+1.24%
1990	794,603	+1.48%
1999	896,441	+1.35%
2007	1,011,207	+1.52%
2012	1,077,627	+1.28%
2017	1,144,892	+1.22%
2023	1,230,289	+1.21%

== Culture ==
=== Language ===
The historical language is Occitan.

=== Totem animals and local festivals ===
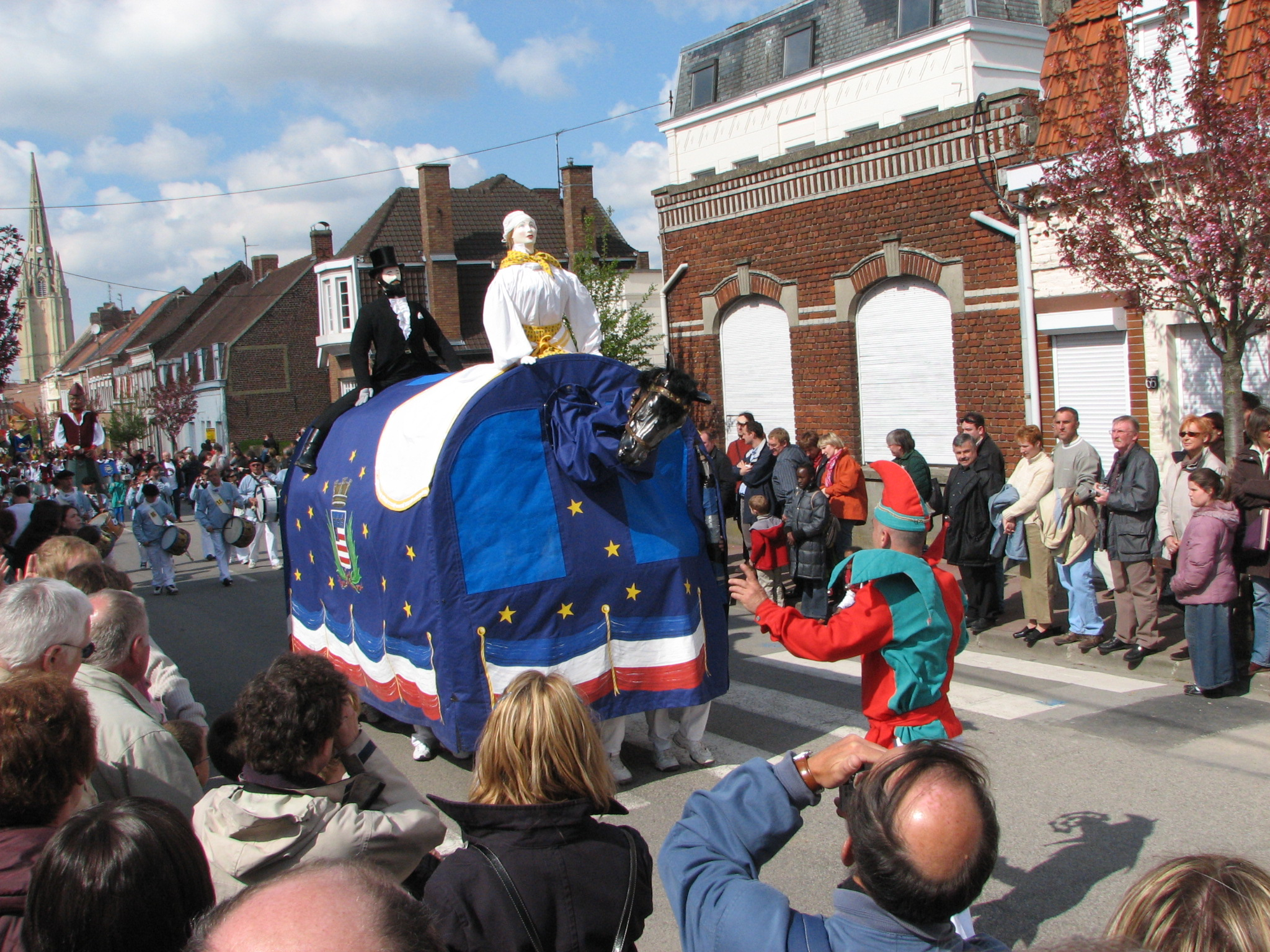
Foal of Pézenas

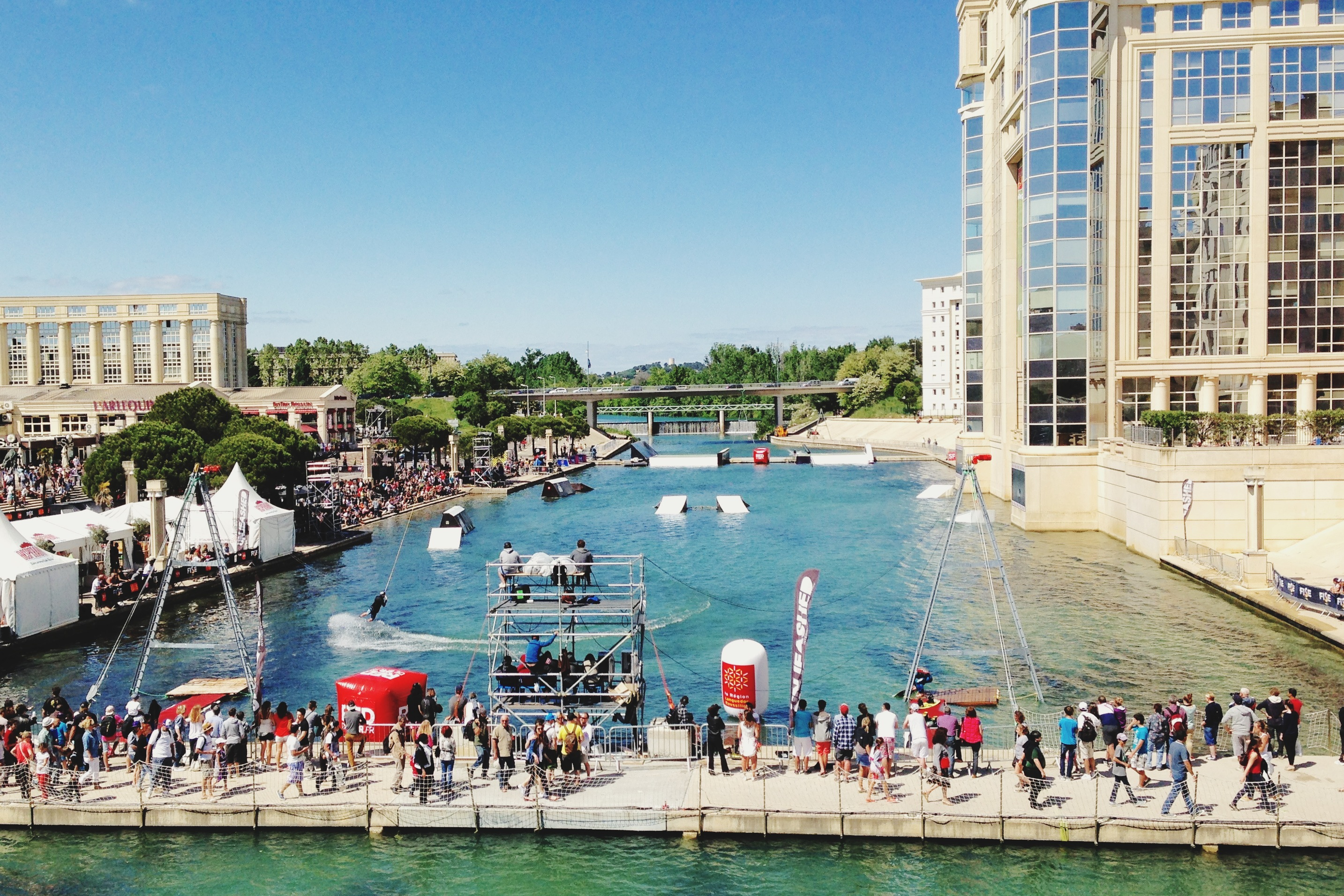
Montpellier's FISE in 2013

- The totemic animals of Herault are typical. During cultural events or local votive festivals, many towns or villages parade a totemic animal representing their municipality through the streets, often accompanied by the sound of traditional musical instruments, such as the Languedoc oboe or fife. The most well-known is the "Foal of Pézenas", which UNESCO proclaimed as part of the intangible cultural heritage, being an example of the Processional giants and dragons in Belgium and France.
- Béziers festivals: Fèsta d'Oc, Béziers's Feria
- Montpellier festivals: I Love Techno Europe, Mediterranean Film Festival, Comédie du Livre, Montpellier Dance Festival, International Festival of Extreme Sports (FISE)
- Cazouls-lès-Béziers festival: Festival Piano Prestige, artistic director Jean-Bernard Pommier
- Pézenas festivals: Printival Boby Lapointe, Mirondela dels Arts
- Sète festivals: Sète's Jazz Festival, Documentary Photo Festival "ImageSingulieres", Poetry Festival "Vivid Voice of the Mediterranean in the Mediterranean"

=== Heritage ===
The Canal du Midi has been designated as a World Heritage Site by UNESCO.

== Economy ==
=== Agriculture ===
Of land in Hérault, 185,048 ha (457,260 acres) (nearly 30%) is used for agriculture. Viticulture is the most important, with 85,525 hectares. The cultivation of cereals uses 20,095 ha (49,660 acres), grazing 7,090 ha (17,500 acres) hectares, 4,991 hectares are left fallow, 3,788 hectares are devoted to the cultivation of vegetables, and 3,400 hectares for orchards (olives, chestnuts, walnuts, plums, apples).

=== Viticulture ===
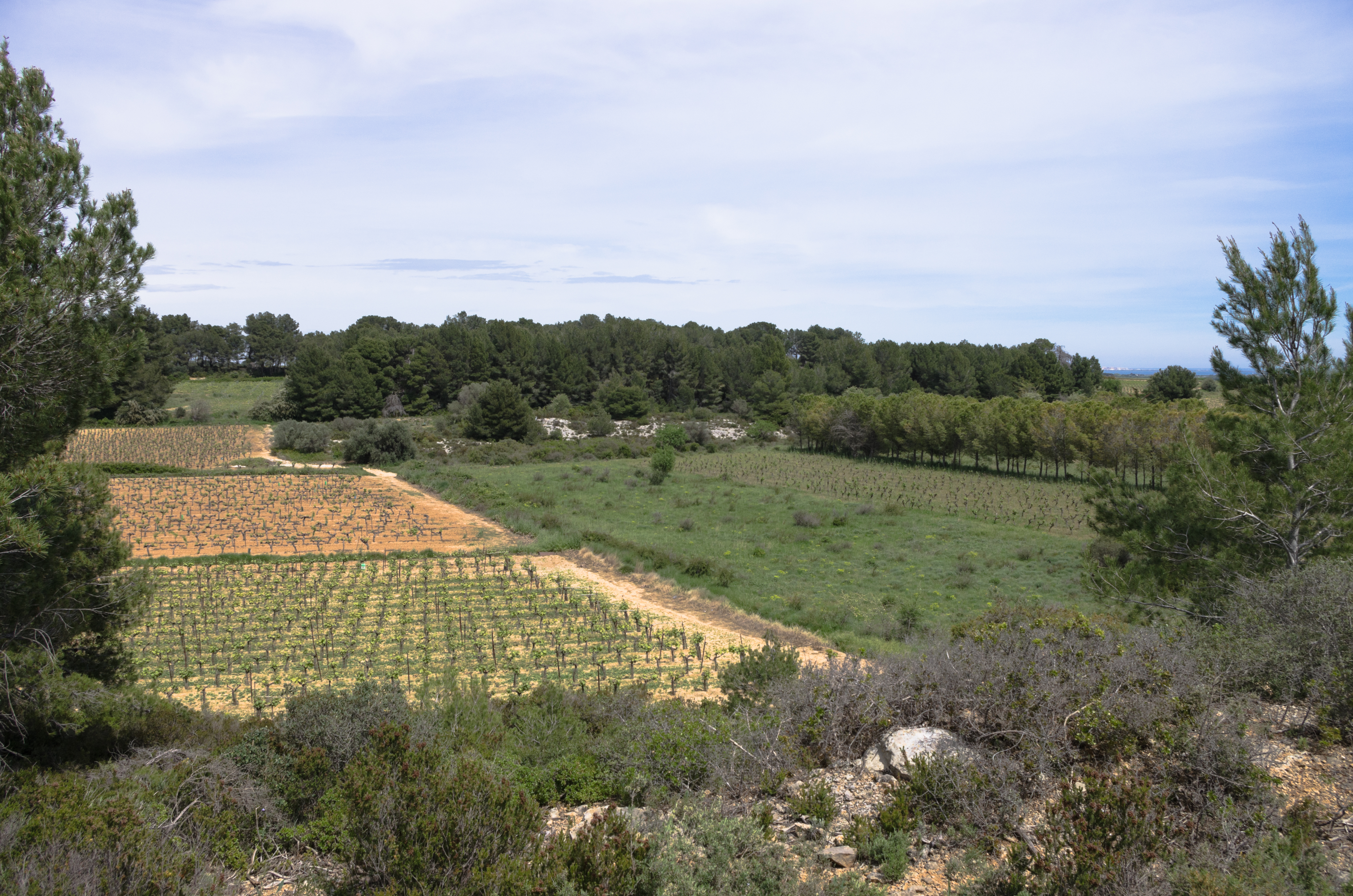
Vineyard in Pinet

The vineyards of Hérault are very old, dating from before the founding of Gallia Narbonensis. Hérault is today the second French wine department, after the Gironde, representing 14% of the total area of the department. The department has a favorable climate, excellent exposure, a wide variety of soils and many varieties of grape: all these assets result in generous, sometimes robust, wines with a wide aromatic palette

- AOC: Saint-Chinian, Faugères, Minervois, Coteaux-du-languedoc, Clairette du Languedoc, Muscat de Frontignan, Muscat de Lunel, Muscat de Mireval, Muscat de Saint-Jean-de-Minervois and Picpoul de Pinet

=== Aquaculture ===
In Hérault, the cultivation of shellfish produces 8,300 tons of oysters (10% of the national production) and 5,900 tons of mussels a year. The Étang de Thau is a centre for growing mussels and oysters in the Mediterranean. At Bouzigues, oysters are cultivated on permanently-immersed, raised breeding.

== Tourism ==
=== Tourist attractions ===
- 87 km of beaches
- 3 World Heritage Sites: Saint-Guilhem-le-Désert Abbey, Canal du Midi and Causses and Cévennes
- 2 Great sites in France: Saint-Guilhem-le-Désert and Gorges de l'Hérault and Cirque de Navacelles
- 1 Regional nature park: Haut-Languedoc Regional Nature Park
- 2 Towns and Lands of Art and History: Pézenas and Lodève
- 3 villages listed in the Most Beautiful Villages of France: Saint-Guilhem-le-Désert, Olargues and Minerve
- 2 coastal resorts classified Heritage of the twentieth century: La Grande-Motte and Cap d'Agde
- 3 Spa town: Balaruc-les-Bains, Avène and Lamalou-les-Bains
- 19 marinas
- 541 sites classified or listed as historic monuments
- Part of Cap d'Agde is a major nudist resort.
- Cruising along the Canal du Midi and walking or cycling along the tow paths is a common holiday activity.
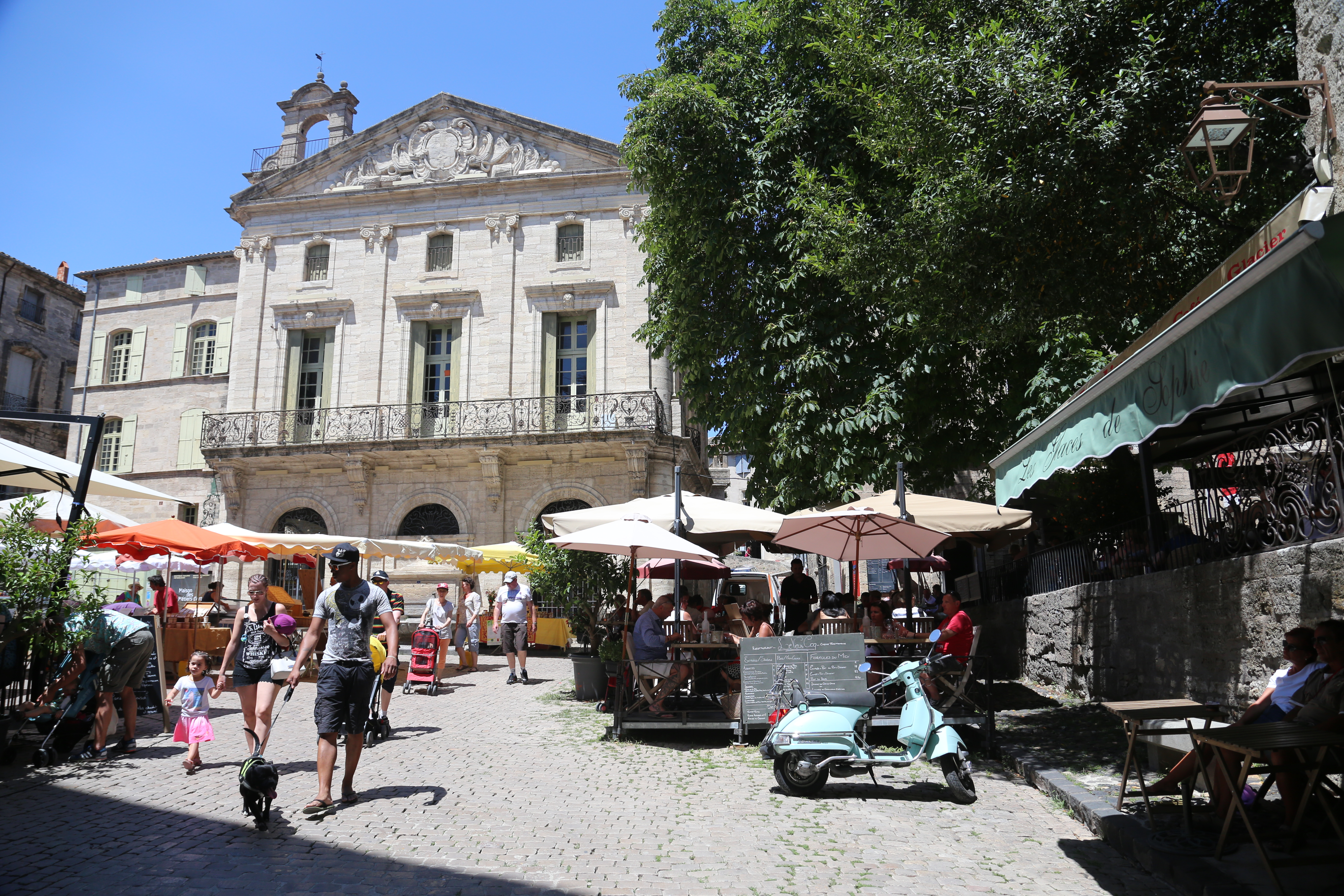
Gambetta square in Pézenas

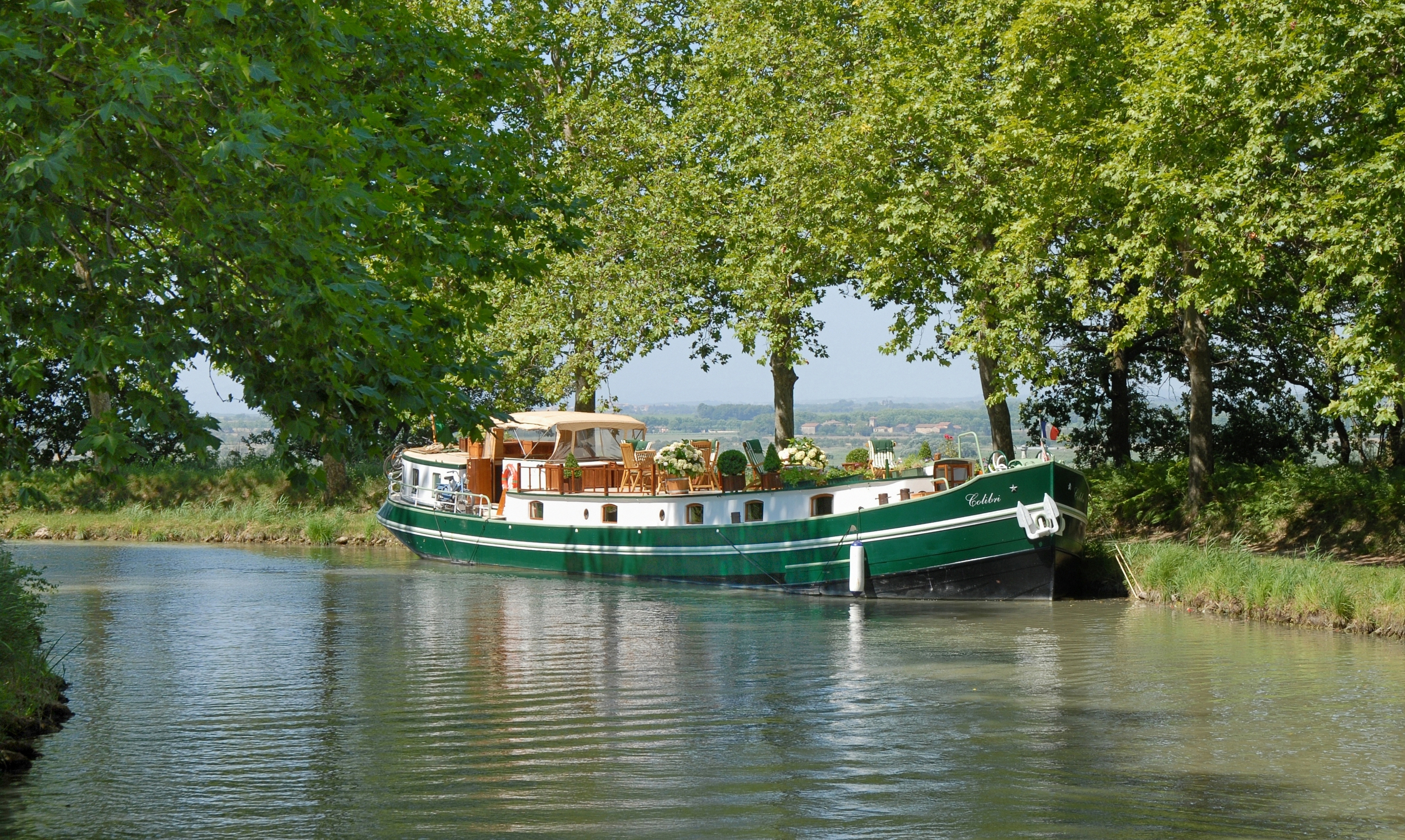
Houseboat on the Canal du Midi

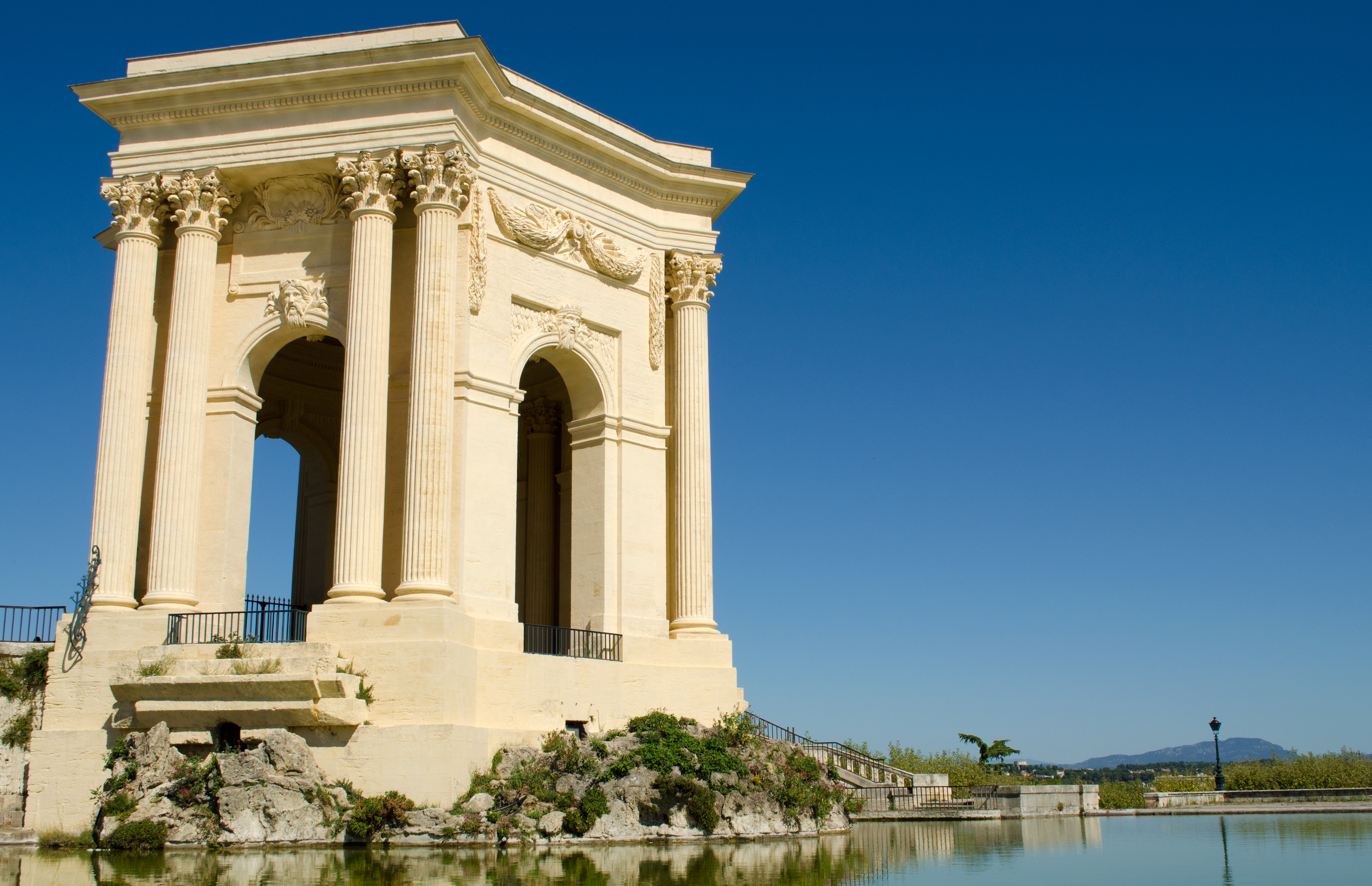
Promenade du Peyrou in Montpellier

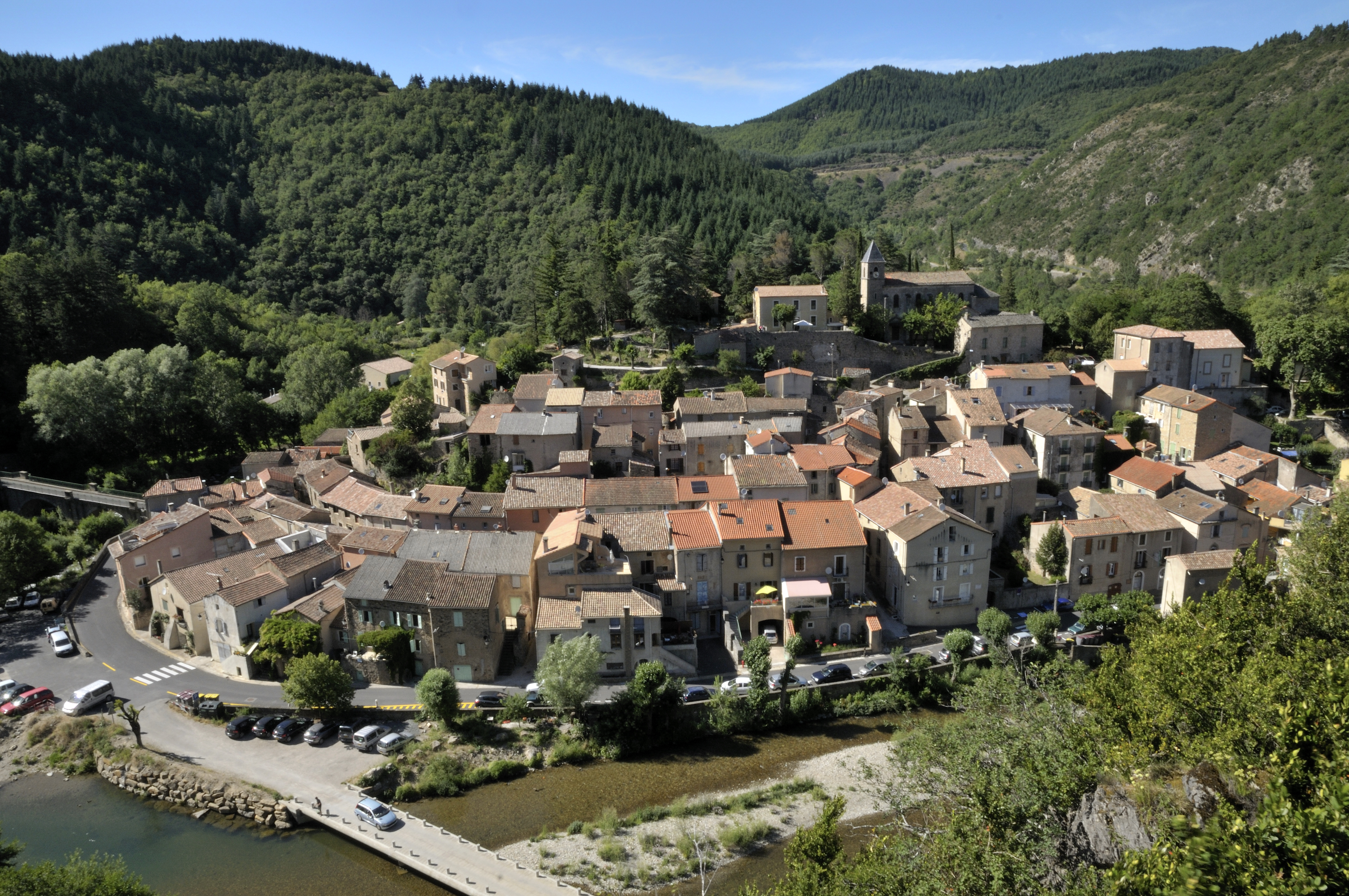
View of Avène

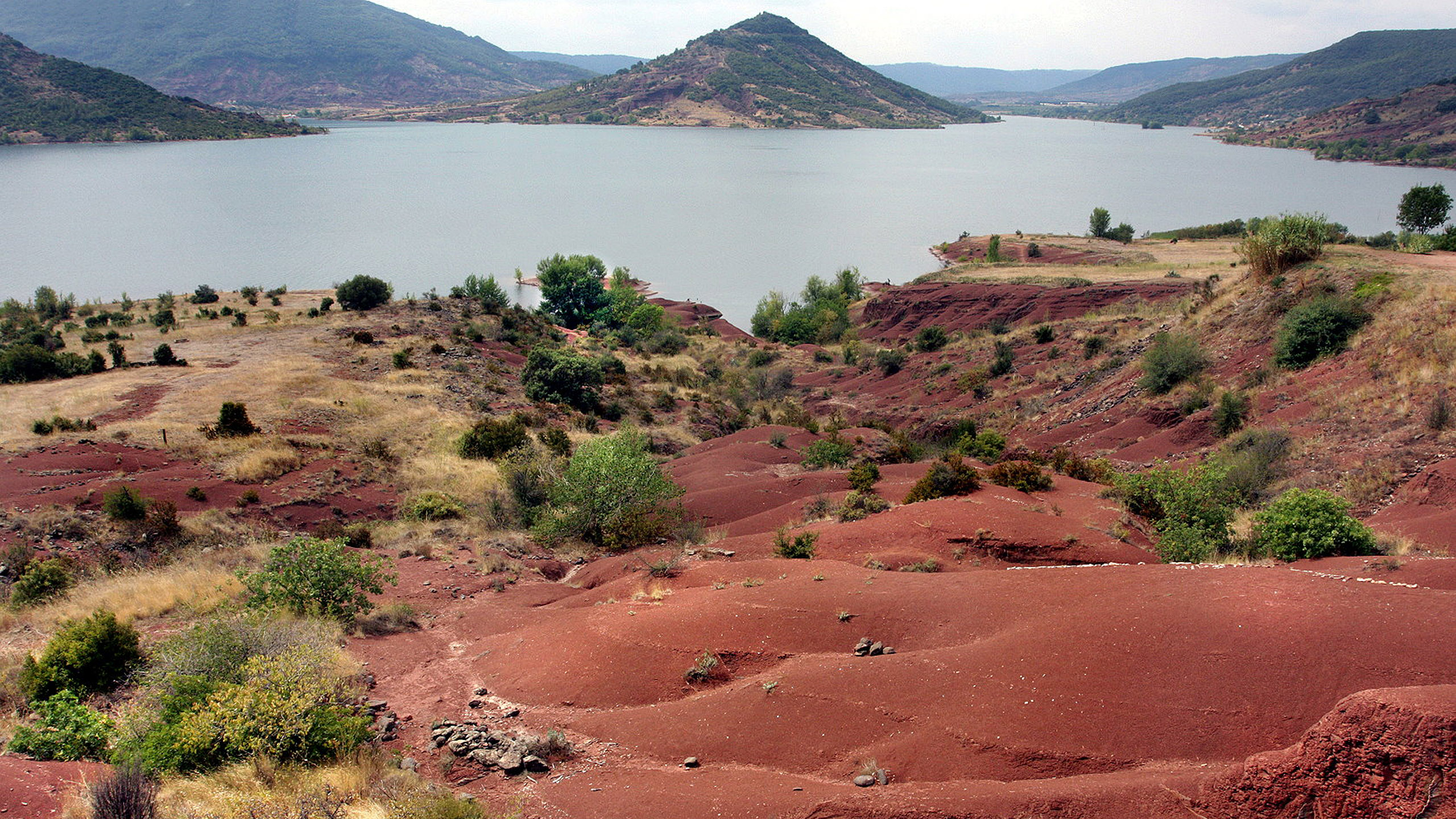
The "Lac du Salagou"

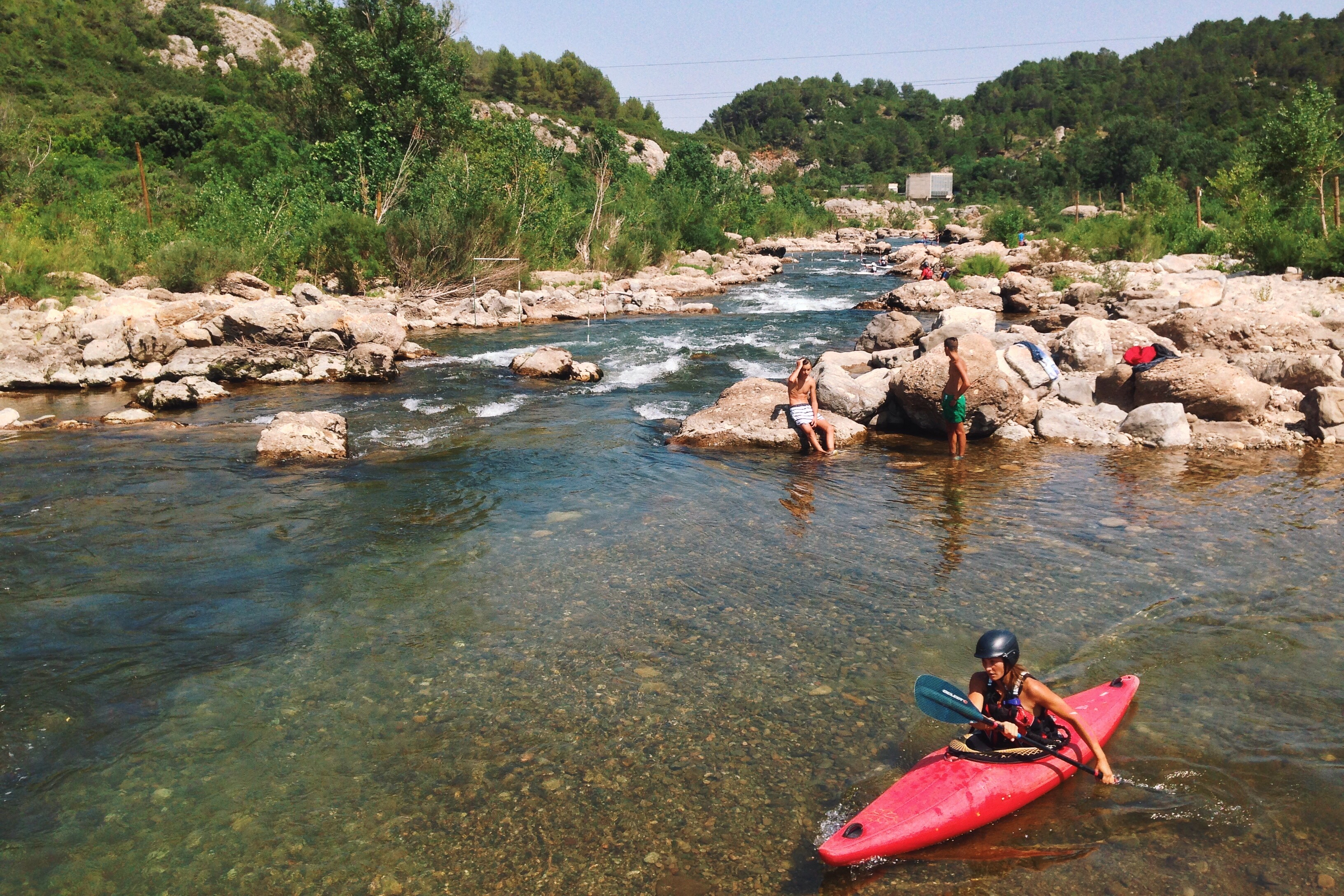
Kayaking on the Orb

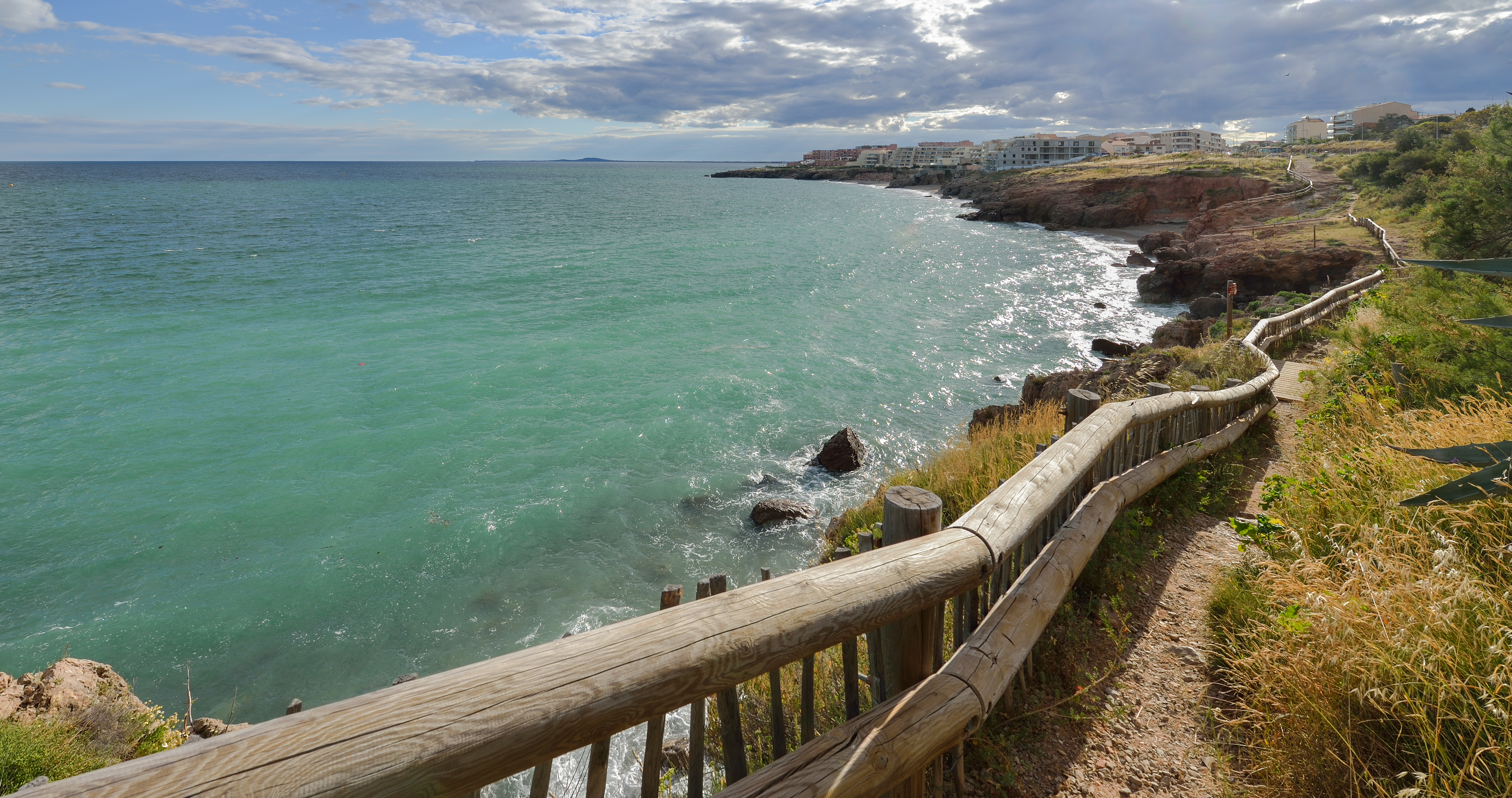
Crique de l'Anau in Sète

== Politics ==
=== Composition of the departmental council ===
The president of the Departmental Council is Kléber Mesquida of the Socialist Party.

Party	Representative
Majority (36 representatives)
FG	2
PS	16
DVG	15
Opposition (14 representatives)
DVD	2
LR	4
UDI	2
FN	6
President of the General Council
Kléber Mesquida (PS)

=== Current National Assembly Representatives ===
Constituency	Member	Party
Hérault's 1st constituency	Jean-Louis Roumegas	The Ecologists
Hérault's 2nd constituency	Nathalie Oziol	La France Insoumise
Hérault's 3rd constituency	Fanny Dombre-Coste	Socialist Party
Hérault's 4th constituency	Manon Bouquin	National Rally
Hérault's 5th constituency	Stéphanie Galzy	National Rally
Hérault's 6th constituency	Julien Gabarron	National Rally
Hérault's 7th constituency	Aurélien Lopez-Liguori	National Rally
Hérault's 8th constituency	Sylvain Carrière	La France Insoumise
Hérault's 9th constituency	Charles Alloncle	Union of the Right for the Republic

=== List of successive presidents ===
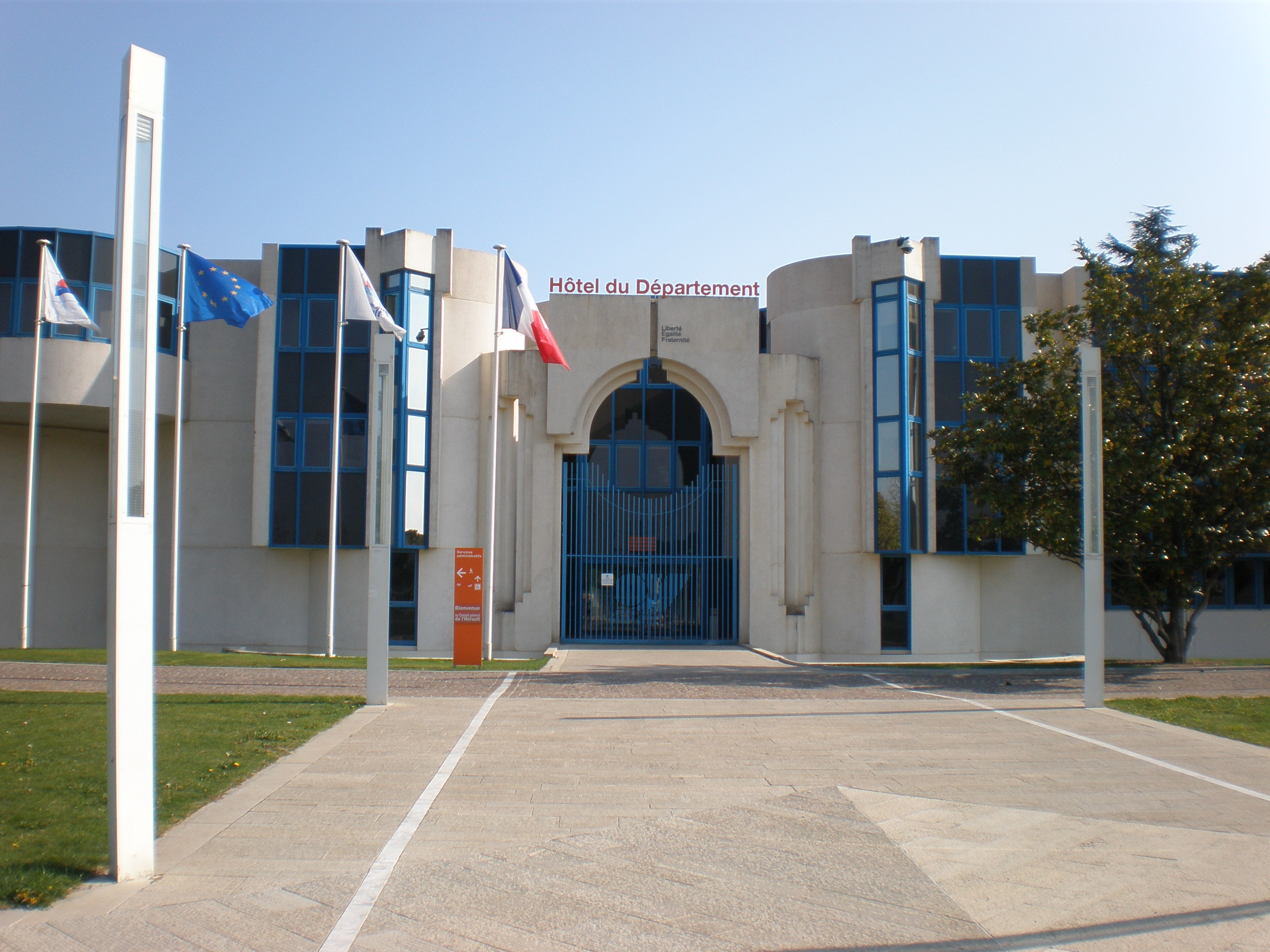
Departmental council's building of Hérault department

Election	Member	Party
1961	Jean Bène	SFIO
1964	Jean Bène	SFIO
1967	Jean Bène	SFIO
1970	Jean Bène	SFIO
1973	Jean Bène	PS
1976	Jean Bène	PS
1979	Gérard Saumade	PS
1982	Gérard Saumade	PS
1985	Gérard Saumade	PS
1988	Gérard Saumade	PS
1992	Gérard Saumade	PS
1994	Gérard Saumade	PS
1998	André Vézinhet	PS
2001	André Vézinhet	PS
2004	André Vézinhet	PS
2008	André Vézinhet	PS
2011	André Vézinhet	PS
2015	Kléber Mesquida	PS

== Sport ==
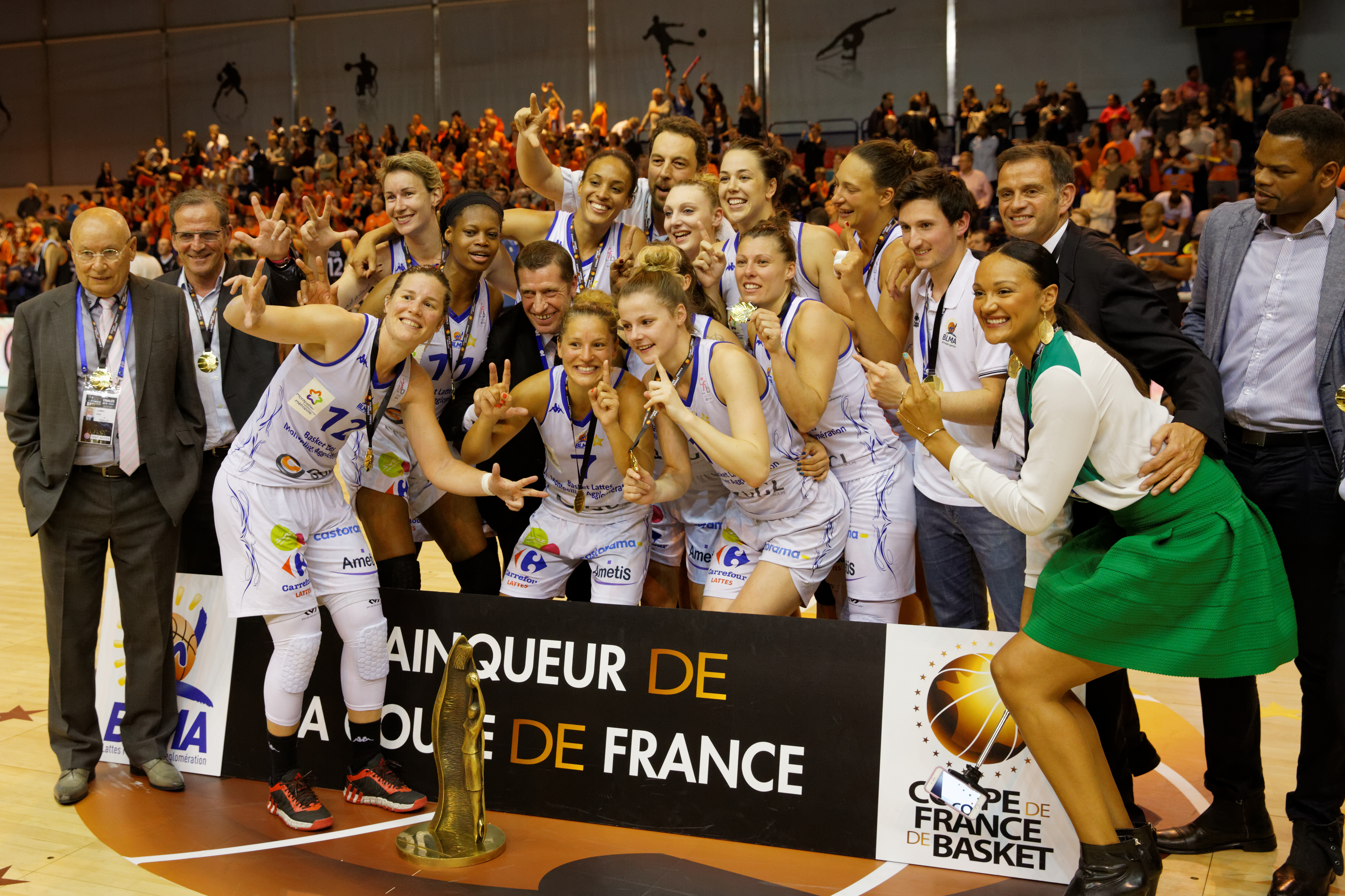
BLMA's team in 2015

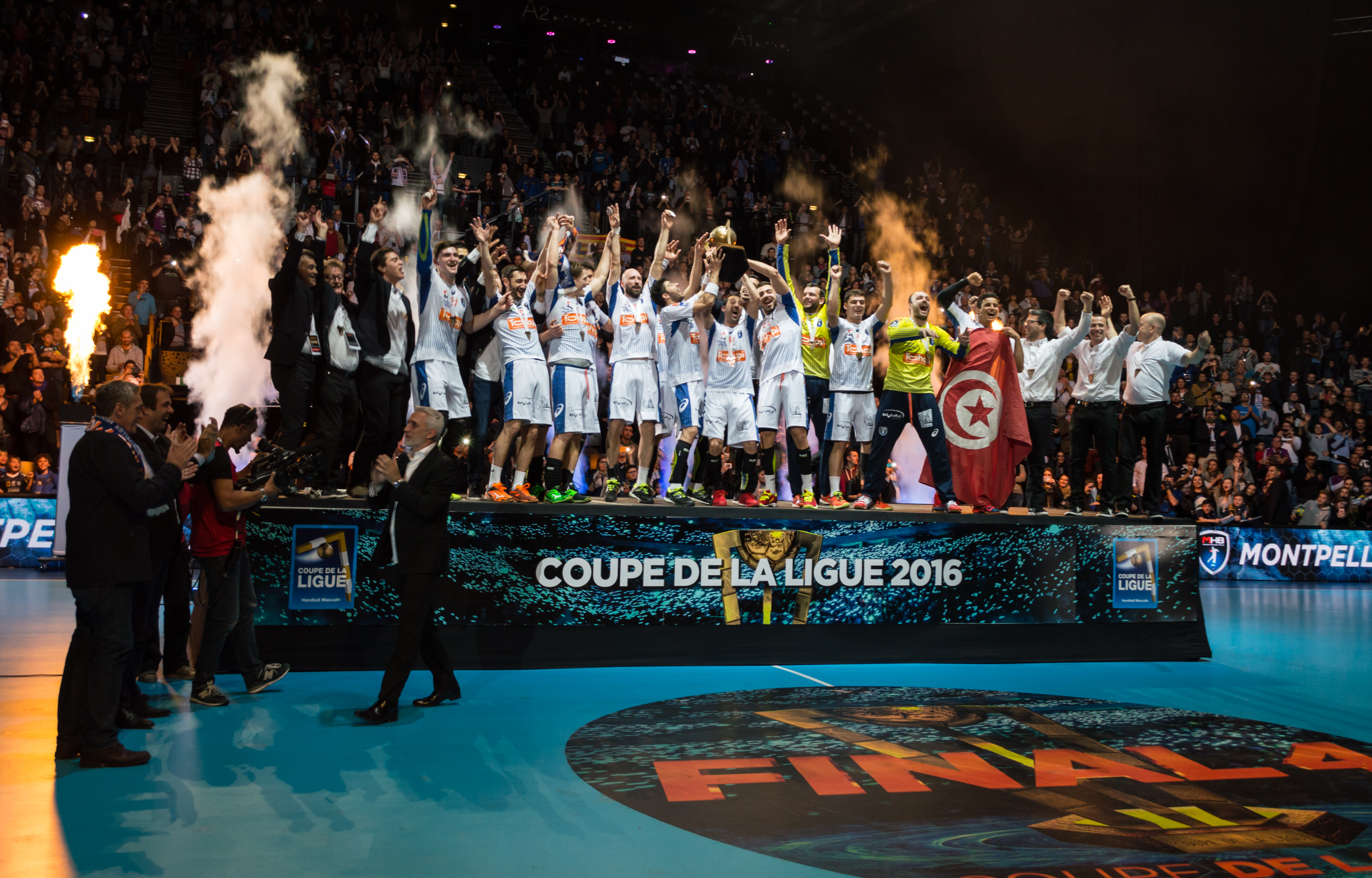
Montpellier Handball's team in 2016

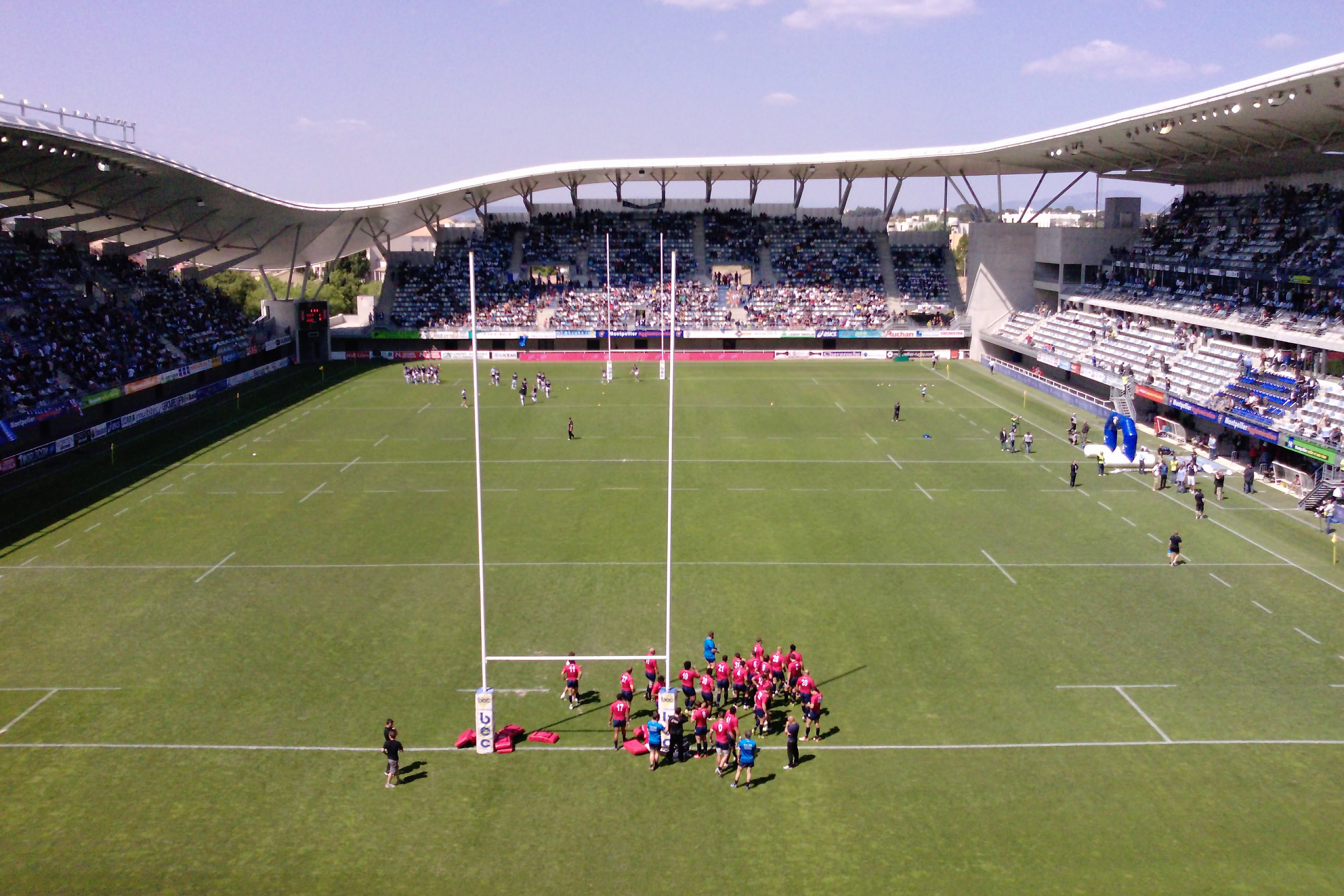
Altrad Stadium, the home stadium of Montpellier Hérault Rugby

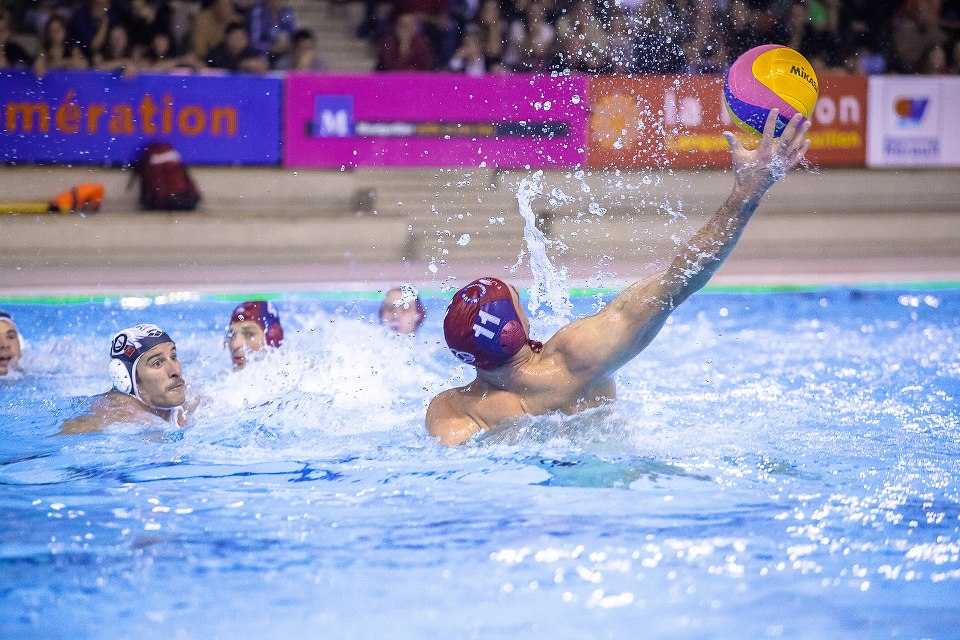
Match between Montpellier Water-Polo and VK Jug in 2012

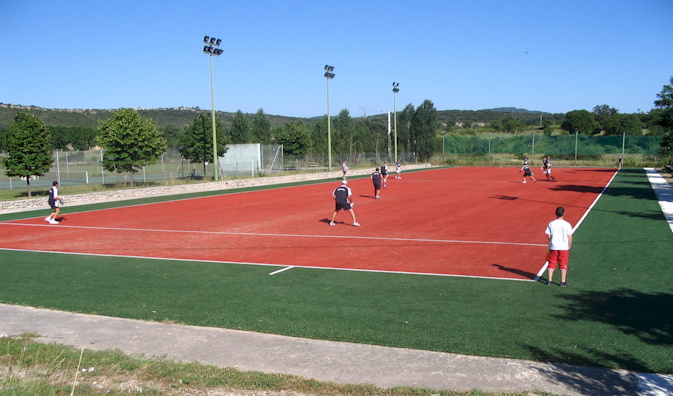
Tamburello's match in Notre-Dame-de-Londres

=== Baseball ===
Club	League
Barracudas de Montpellier	D1

=== Basketball ===
Club	League
BLMA	LFB; EuroCup Women; EuroLeague Women

=== Beach soccer ===
Club	League
Grande Motte Pyramide Beach Soccer	French Beach Football Championship
Montpellier Hérault Beach Soccer	French Beach Football Championship

=== Football ===
Club	League
AS Béziers	Ligue 2
Montpellier HSC	Ligue 1
Montpellier HSC (Women)	Division 1 Féminine
FC Sète 34	N2

=== Handball ===
Club	League
Montpellier Handball	Division 1 EHF Champions League

=== Volley-ball ===
Club	League
Béziers Volley (Women)	Ligue AF
Arago de Sète	Ligue AM
Montpellier Volley Université Club	Ligue AM

=== Rugby ===
Club	League
Rugby olympique agathois	Fédérale 1
AS Béziers Hérault	Pro D2
Montpellier Hérault Rugby	Top 14; European Rugby Champions Cup
Montpellier Hérault Rugby (Women)	Top 8

=== Water polo ===
Club	League
Montpellier Water-Polo	Pro A

=== Specific sports ===
There are several sports specific to Hérault: tamburello (85% of players are French) and water jousting.

== See also ==
- Arrondissements of the Hérault department
- Cantons of the Hérault department
- Castles in Hérault
- Communes of the Hérault department
