= Arrondissements of the Hérault department =

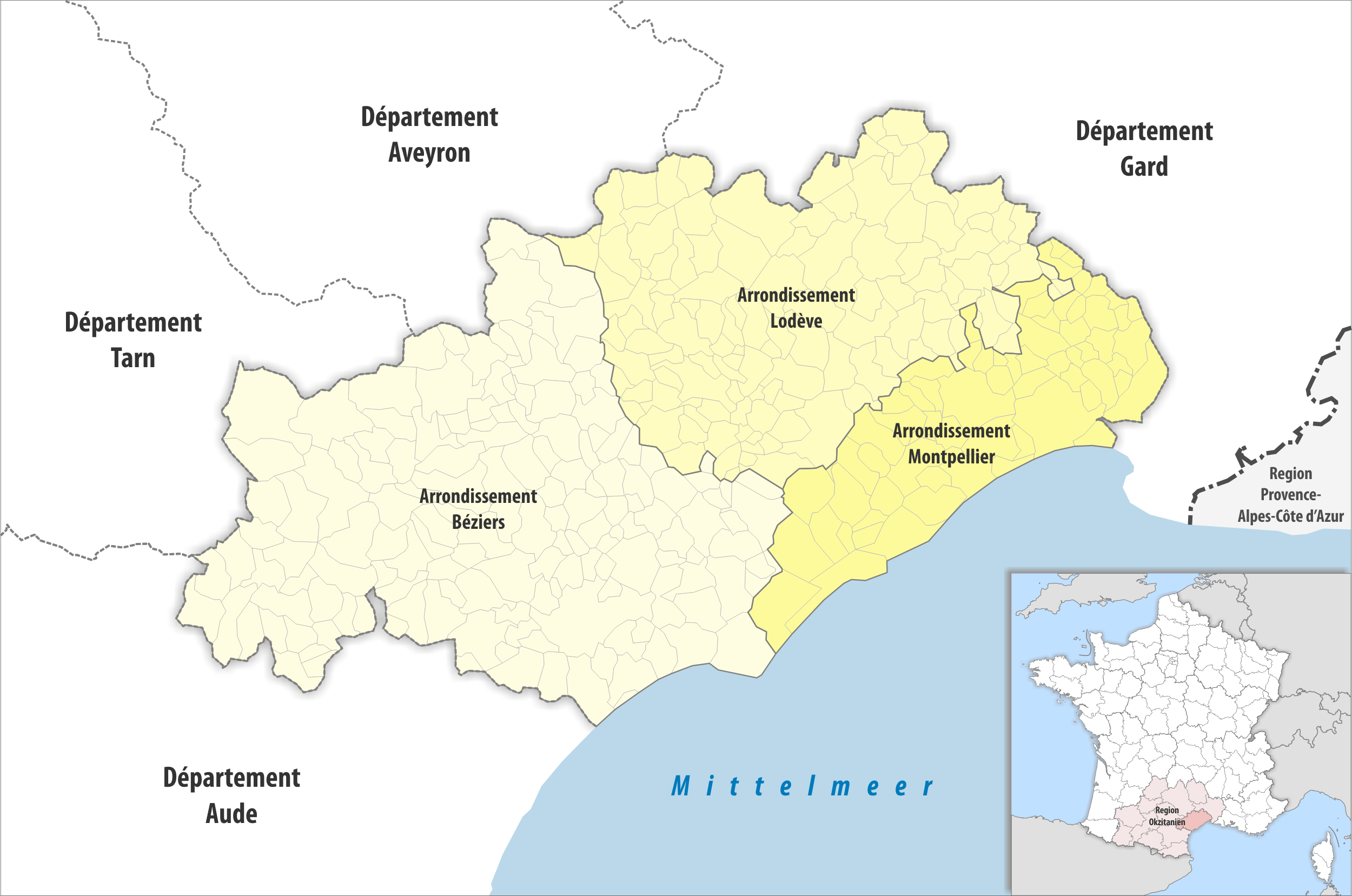
Map of arrondissements of the Hérault department.

The 3 arrondissements of the Hérault department are:

1. Arrondissement of Béziers, (subprefecture: Béziers) with 153 communes. The population of the arrondissement was 321,879 in 2021.
2. Arrondissement of Lodève, (subprefecture: Lodève) with 122 communes. The population of the arrondissement was 146,845 in 2021.
3. Arrondissement of Montpellier, (prefecture of the Hérault department: Montpellier) with 67 communes. The population of the arrondissement was 733,159 in 2021.

== History ==
In 1800 the arrondissements of Montpellier, Béziers, Lodève and Saint-Pons were established. The arrondissements of Lodève and Saint-Pons were disbanded in 1926, and Lodève was restored in 1942. In 2009 the arrondissement of Montpellier lost the three cantons of Aniane, Ganges and Saint-Martin-de-Londres to the arrondissement of Lodève.

The borders of the arrondissements of Hérault were modified in January 2017:

- five communes from the arrondissement of Béziers to the arrondissement of Lodève
- one commune from the arrondissement of Béziers to the arrondissement of Montpellier
- seven communes from the arrondissement of Lodève to the arrondissement of Béziers
- 26 communes from the arrondissement of Montpellier to the arrondissement of Lodève
