= Stéphanie Galzy =

French politician

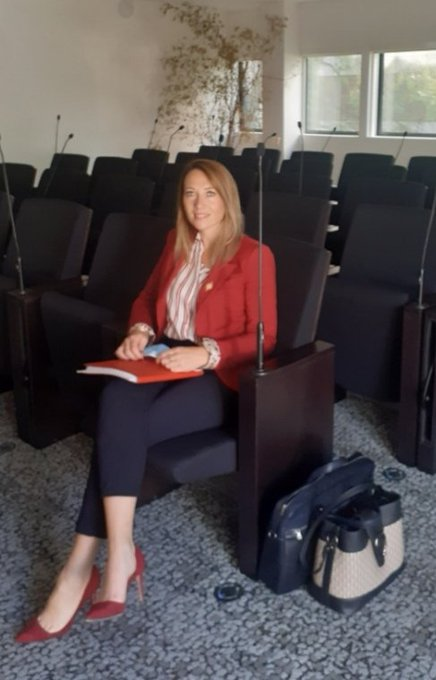
- Stéphanie Galzy

Member of the National Assembly for Hérault's 5th constituency
- Incumbent
- Assumed office 22 June 2022
- Preceded by: Philippe Huppé

Personal details
- Born: 21 October 1981 (age 44) Pézenas, France
- Party: National Rally
- Occupation: Politician

Stéphanie Galzy (born 21 October 1981) is a French politician for the National Rally who has been the Member of the National Assembly for Hérault's 5th constituency since 2022.

== Biography ==
Galzy was born in Pézenas and grew up in Agde. She has described herself as a single mother in an interview with France3.

She first joined the National Rally in 2014 and worked as a local organizer and activist for the party. During the 2022 French legislative election, she was elected to Hérault's 5th constituency.

As a candidate for the National Rally in the French legislative elections of 2022, she was elected deputy for the fifth constituency of Hérault on 19 June 2022 with 54.24% of the votes cast, against Pierre Polard, the NUPES-LFI candidate and Mayor of Capestang.
