= Kléber Mesquida =

French politician

Kléber Mesquida (born 3 August 1945 in Douaouda, French Algeria) was a member of the National Assembly of France. He represented the Hérault department, and is a member of the Socialiste, radical, citoyen et divers gauche.
