= Étienne Mourrut =

French politician

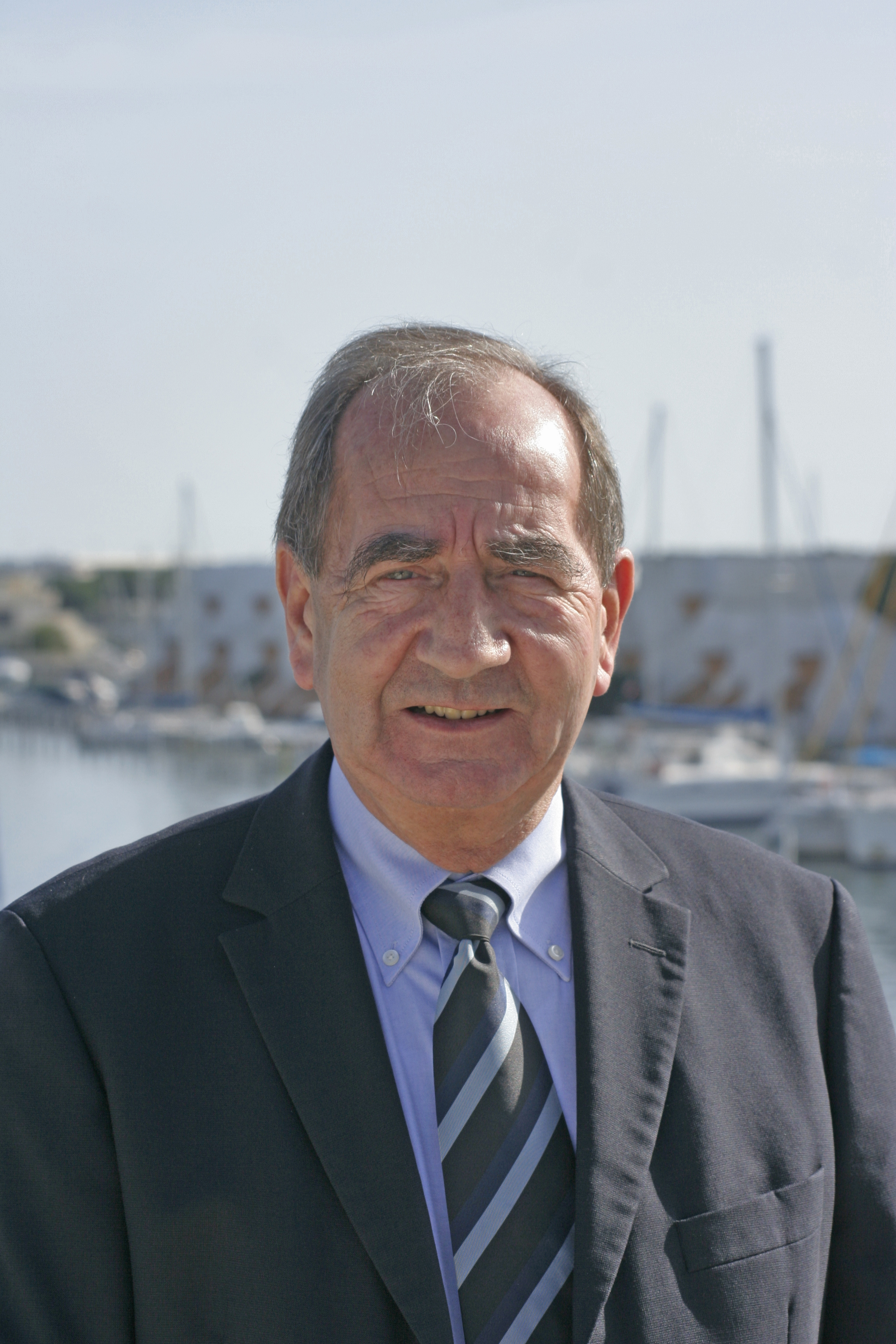
- Étienne Mourrut in Port-Camargue.

Mayor of Le Grau-du-Roi
- In office 13 March 1983 – 4 April 2014
- Preceded by: Jean Bastide
- Succeeded by: Robert Crauste

Member of the National Assembly
- In office 19 June 2002 – 17 June 2012
- Preceded by: Alain Fabre-Pujol
- Succeeded by: Gilbert Collard
- Constituency: Gard (2nd district)

Personal details
- Born: 4 December 1939 Le Grau-du-Roi, Gard, France
- Died: 19 October 2014 (aged 74) Montpellier, France
- Resting place: Le Grau-du-Roi; Boucanet Cimetery
- Party: Rally for the Republic (RPR); Union for a Popular Movement (UMP)
- Other political affiliations: Arise the Republic (DLR)
- Spouse: Michèle Mourrut
- Children: 2 children
- Profession: shopkeeper

Étienne Mourrut (French: [etjɛn muʁy]; 4 December 1939 - 19 October 2014) was a French politician.

A member of the RPR and the UMP, he was deputy of the 2nd District of the Gard between 2002 and 2012 and Mayor of Le Grau-du-Roi between 1983 and 2014. From 2002 to 2012 he was also a Member of the National Assembly.

== Biography ==
=== Family ===
On his father's side, he comes from a family of Graulen fishermen. Her mother, descended from Italian immigrants, was born in 1909 and died in 2005 and was a bazaar merchant. Of his seven or eight siblings, two died for France during the Great War.

His parents were "very Catholic", and would later be reticent of their son's engagement in the political system.

He had a sister, named Émélie.

He was married to Michele - who he encountered during his military service in St. Raphael, see below - in 1962 and was father of two sons, Jean-Michel and Patrice born respectively in 1963 and 1967 and both traders His stepdaughter was Pascale Mourrut, who was a candidate for the regional elections 2010 in Languedoc-Roussillon and municipal elections of 2014 Grau-du-Roi and his parliamentary assistant until 2012. It became in 2014, shortly before his death, parliamentary collaborator Vivette Lopez.

Finally, he had four grandchildren: Amelia, Nicolas, Marie and Leo-Paul and was also the cousin of Leopold Rosso.

He lived in the city center of Le Grau-du-Roi, on the left bank of the channel.

=== Childhood and Education ===
In his youth, Mourrut was nicknamed the Spanish word "bacalao" means "cod". He kept that nickname for all his life.

He was raised "in the cult of remembrance, in respect for the nation". When he was 14, the story of the battle of Diên Biên Phu, read in the Midi Libre, the brand. He was also struck by the inaction and corruption of politicians in the Fourth Republic. All this, therefore, helped to bring him closer to the personality of General de Gaulle.

=== Professional career ===
In a left region, he was in favor of French Algeria.

He made his military service in the French Navy from 1960 to 1962, where he was called to the Saint-Raphaël Naval Air Station. He nevertheless participated in operations of the Algerian War.

He then became employed at Salins du Midi, where he gained charge of maintenance and created the FO Union.

He went back to being a merchant in 1972 and ended up debiting tobacco.

=== Political career ===
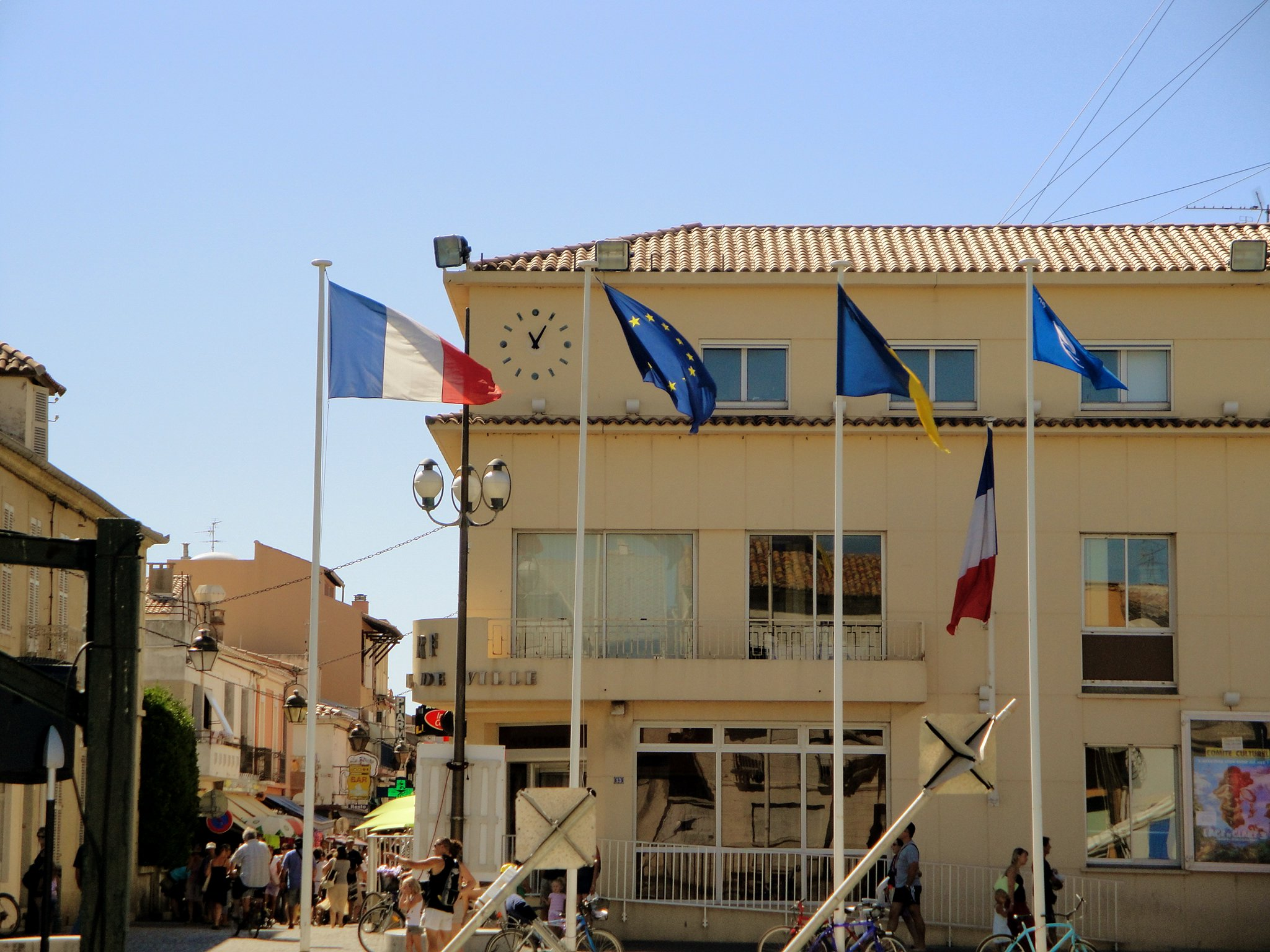
The town of Grau-du-Roi.

Especially after seeing the delayed development of Grau-du-Roi compared to the Var commons, Étienne Mourrot decided to engage in politics. In 1965, at 25 years of age, he became alderman of the town run by the team of the Socialist Jean Bastide; although at bottom of the list, he was one of the best elected. He dreamed of being assistant.

Disagreeing with the mayor, he led an apolitical list in 1971, but was beaten and did not get enough votes to sit in the municipal opposition. He then ran the local paper Lou Fanal for six years and, to oppose the management of the mayor, attended all council meetings and works records. He joined the Rally for the Republic (RPR) in 1975. He renewed his candidature in 1977 and sat on the municipal council again.

He went to local elections in 1979 in the canton of Aigues-Mortes, facing the councillors André Fabre and Jean Bastide, but lost.

In 1980, he was elected secretary of the RPR constituency: then, it was the most extensive in all of France.

==== Mayor of Le Grau-du-Roi ====
===== 1983-1990: First Steps as Mayor of Le Grau-du-Roi =====
Mourrot was elected mayor in municipal elections in 1983. He was constantly re-elected from that point onward.

His first major action was the pedestrianization of Rédarès Street in 1984, followed by many other routes later on. After the 1984 to 1986 port developments, construction of municipal subdivisions Lou Lantern (1985), The Magnolias (1988) and Thessaloniki (1990), and the creation of the Maison des Vins at Espiguette took place. At the same time, a children's nursery and new cemetery in 1988, the Palace of Sport and Culture in 1990, and the Sea Palace with Seaquarium in 1989 were created.

On 15 August 1984, he decided to start management of municipalization in Grau-du-Roi arenas, and he entrusted Philippe Cuillé to do such.

He was finally elected to the General Council of Gard in 1985. He sold his mandate in 2002 to Leopold Rosso in order to comply with the mandate of accumulation.

He was a regional councilor from 1986 to 1992.

In 1987, he proceeded to the change of the land use plan (POS).

Re-elected in municipal elections in 1989 against Michel Picon, he was chosen as the chief assistant of Mireille Ardois already under the previous term of office assistant and future CEO of SAGR.

In April 1990, he organized a big rally on the anniversary of his re-election.

===== 1990-2000: Profound Changes =====
During the 1990s, Le Grau-du-Roi continued to develop various facilities: a casino opened in 1993 and the Waterfront Boulevard was renovated and enlarged, which eventually became the Marshal Boulevard in June. 1996 saw the construction of a waste-water treatment plant and the installation of a thalassotherapy center settled in Port-Camargue. Additionally, the city acquired the private nursing home of the St. Vincent residence in 1999.

While being candidate of the RPR for senatorial elections in September 1998, he was defeated in the second round, coming in fifth place behind Gilbert Baumet.

In 2002, he organized a local referendum founded on the purchase of the Villa Rédarès municipality.
