= Port-Camargue =

- District of Le Grau-du-Roi
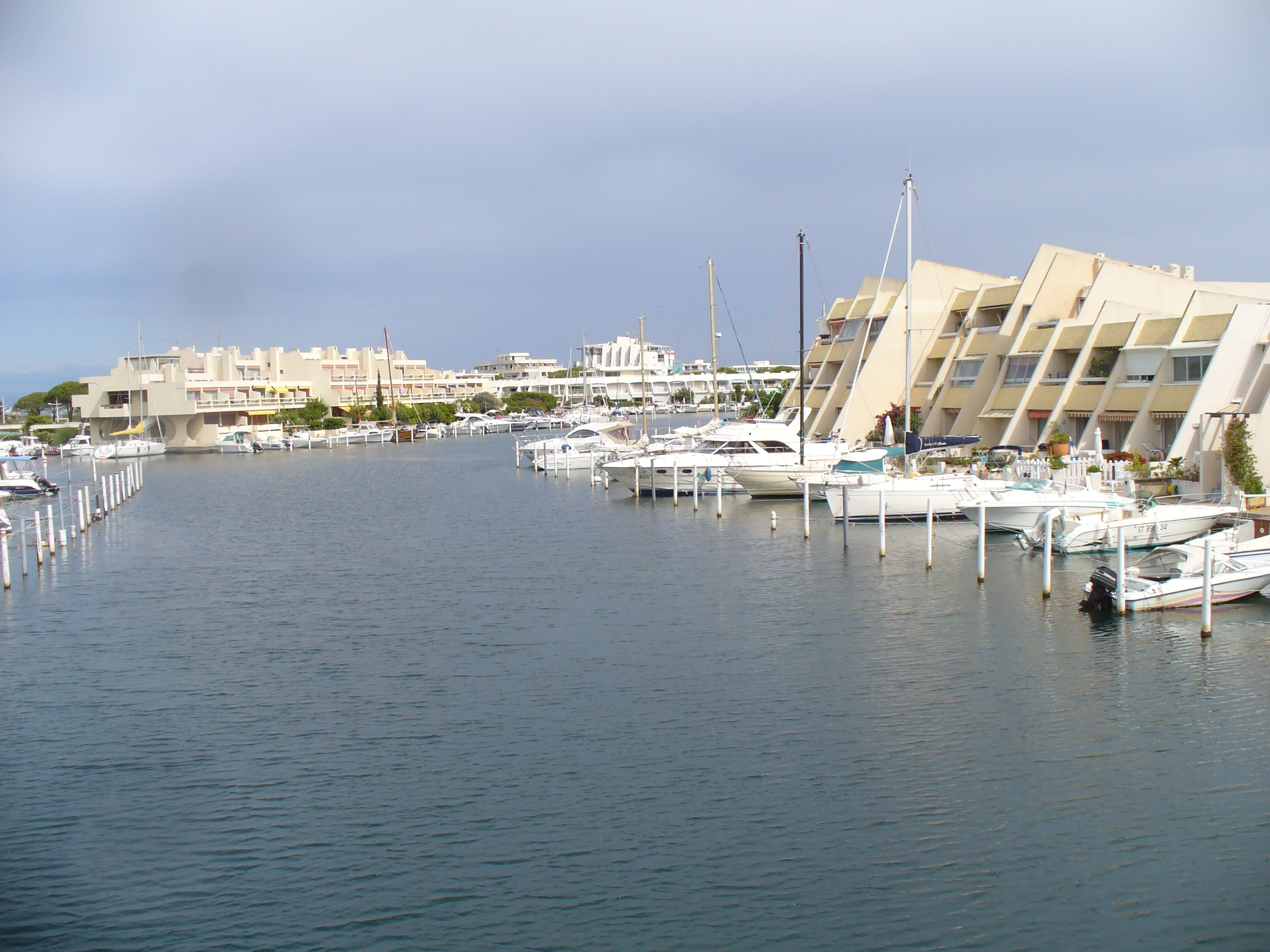
- Interactive map of Port-Camargue
- Coordinates: 43°31′00″N 4°08′08″E
- Country: France
- Region: Occitanie
- Department: Gard
- Arrondissement: Nîmes
- Canton: Aigues-Mortes
- Intercommunality: Terre de Camargue
- Commune: Le Grau-du-Roi
- Website: www.portcamargue.com

Port-Camargue (Occitan: Port Camarga) is a district of the town of Le Grau-du-Roi, in the Gard department in the administrative region of Occitanie. Built in the 1960s, it is today one of the biggest marinas in Europe.

== History ==
In 1963, the Nîmes Chamber of Commerce and Industry (CCI), with the assistance of Jean Bastide, launched the project to build a new marina on the Languedoc coast, as part of the Mission Racine. The architect selected was Jean Balladur, who also drew up the plans for La Grande-Motte. Its construction began in 1969 with the creation of ponds, quays and piers. Then the first marinas were built. In 1974, the harbor office appeared. In 1980, the second phase of work concerning marinas was launched and in 1985 the initial CCI construction plan. Since then, under market pressure, town planning has continued to evolve with the construction of many additional marinas, apartments and villas. His Régie was chaired by Étienne Mourrut when he was mayor of Le Grau-du-Roi .

== Economy ==
With 4,600 berths, Port-Camargue is one of the top marinas in Europe. More and more permanent residents live there and commercial activity has intensified, with more than a hundred shops. Tourism, along with yachting and boating, is the essence of the economy of Port-Camargue.

Note, moreover, the presence near Port-Camargue of numerous campsites and vast beaches (including that of Espiguette, which extends to Saintes-Maries-de-la-Mer).

== Navigation and nautical information ==
Access to the marina is by a channel open to the northwest, in an axis leaving little room for swell. The bottom is sandy and dredged on average at 5 metres. Landing under sail in fairly strong mistral weather can be difficult but without any major risks.

Note the presence for the arrival from the south of wave buoys opposite the Pointe de l'Espiguette. These are sometimes removed for maintenance reasons. They make it possible to indicate the limit of the area of sandbanks bordering along the beaches of the bay. When navigating nearby, the use of the depth sounder is highly recommended. Most of the rocky sand bars extend underwater for more than ten meters. Avoid approaching them too closely.

The harbor master's office is on (almost) permanent standby on channel 9 and can be reached by telephone. Refueling is possible; the station is located after the reception area, following the most northerly channel (to port). Finally, note the presence of an SNSM speedboat, two sailing schools and a UCPA center.

== Gallery ==
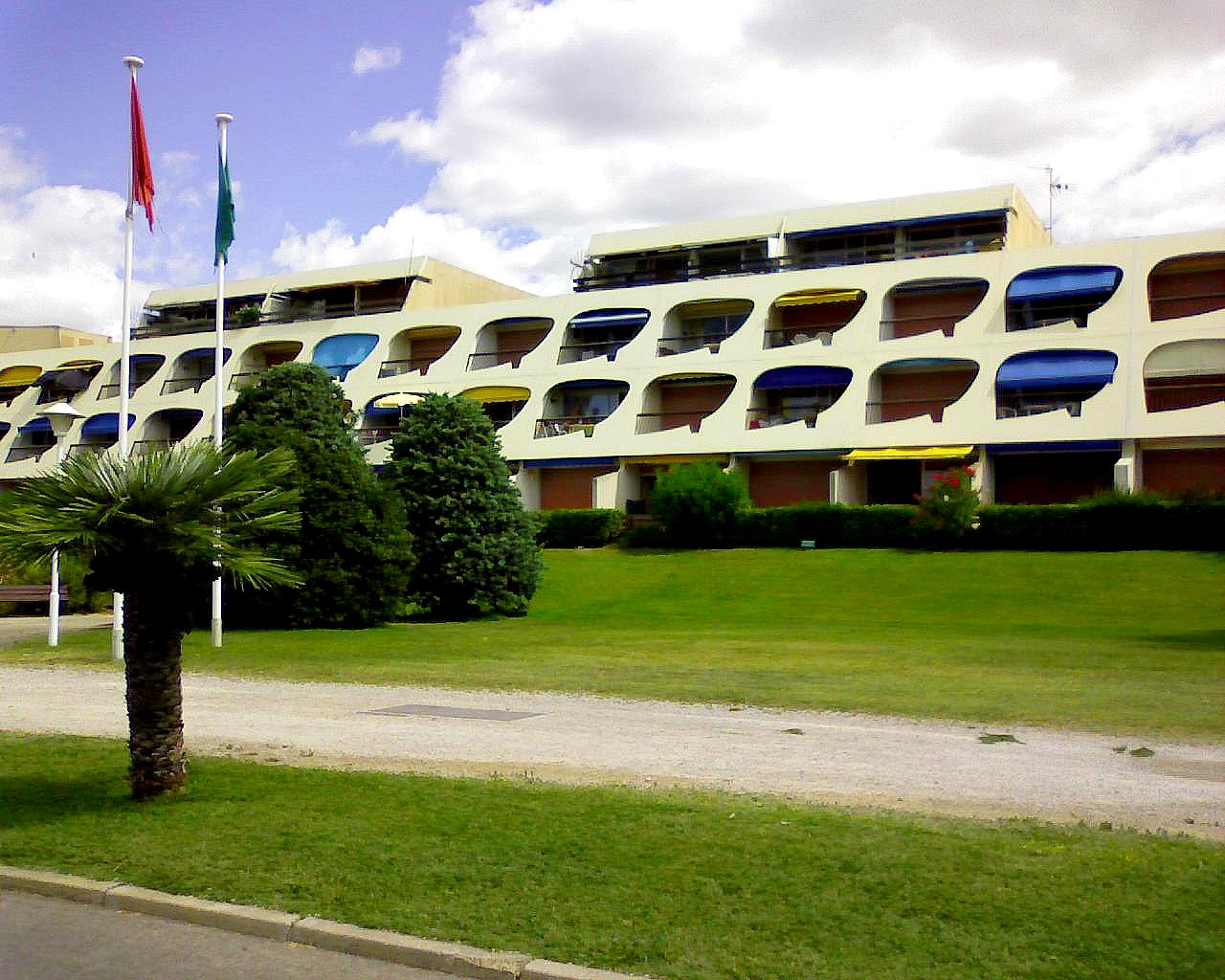
Résidence l'Escale Port

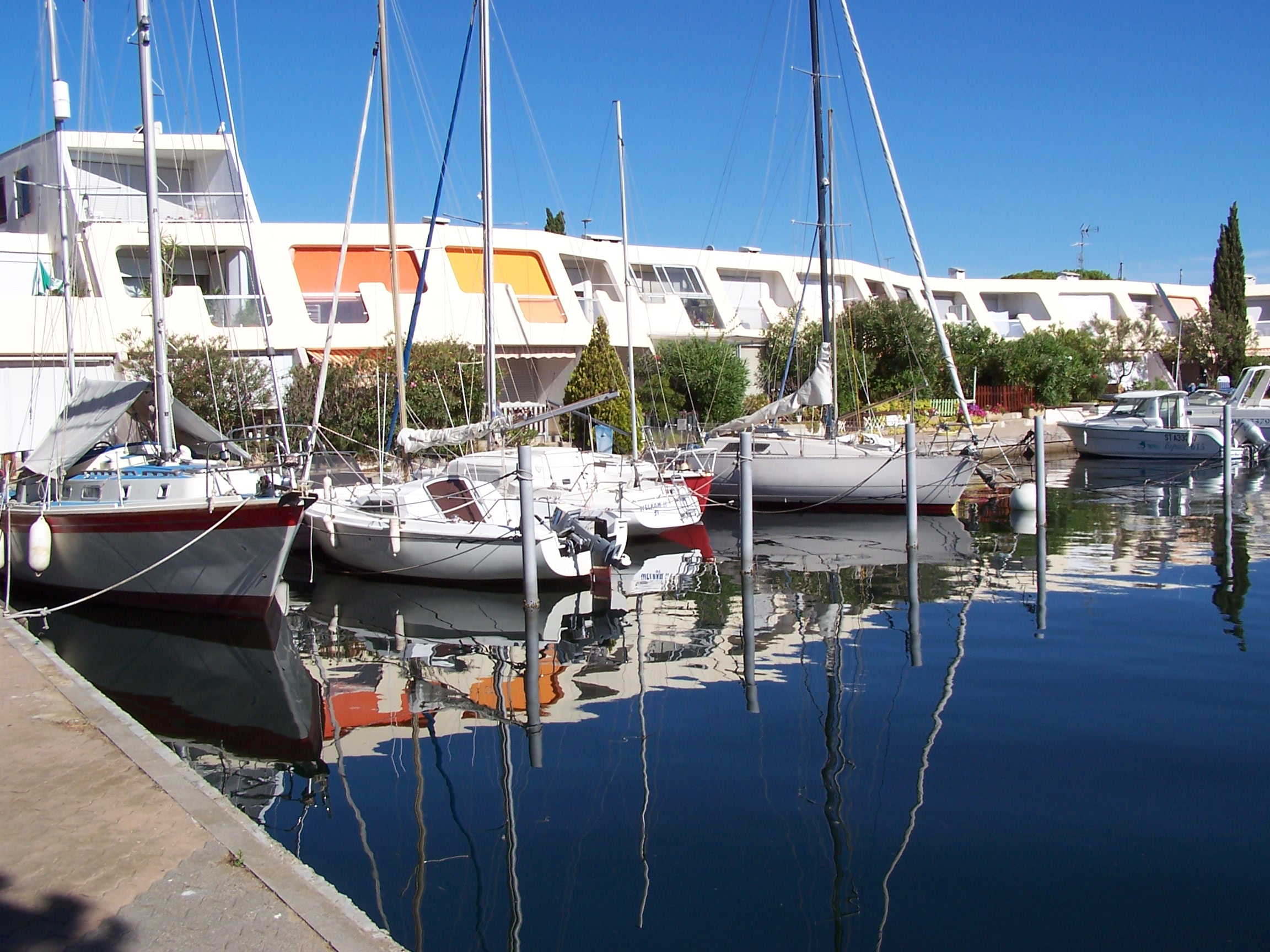
Marina Les Arpèges

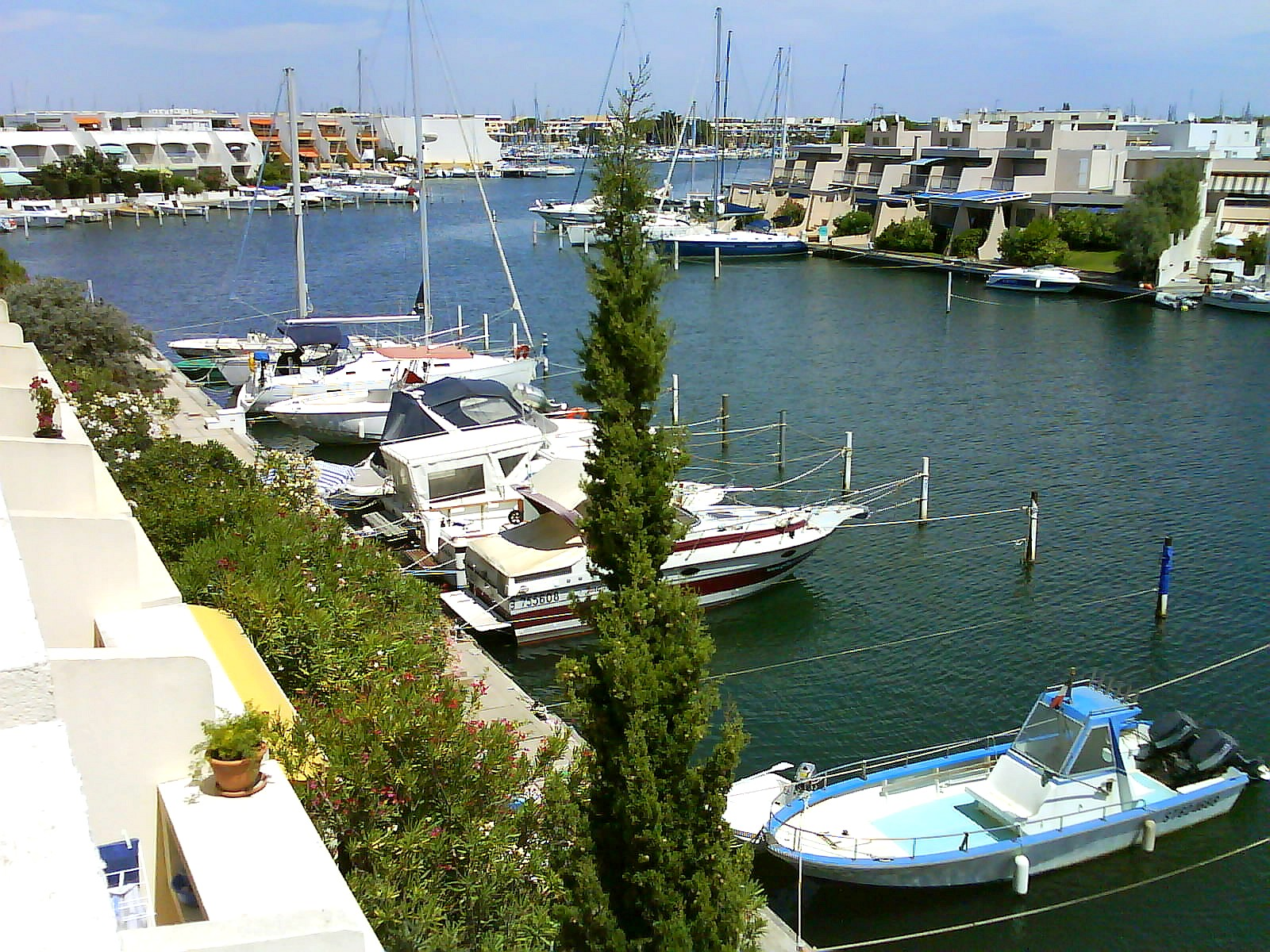
Quais de la marina Ulysse Plage

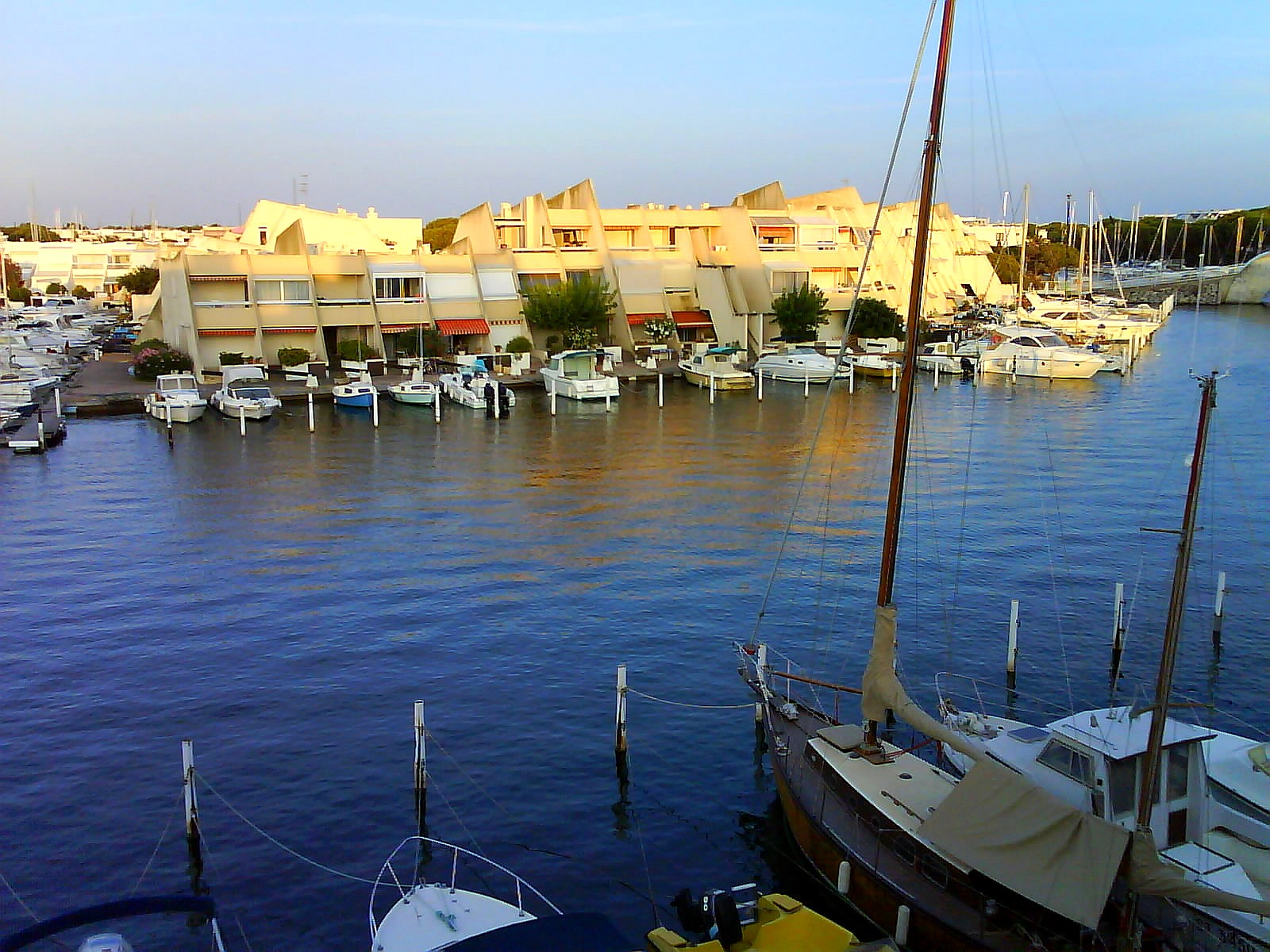
Marina Nirvana

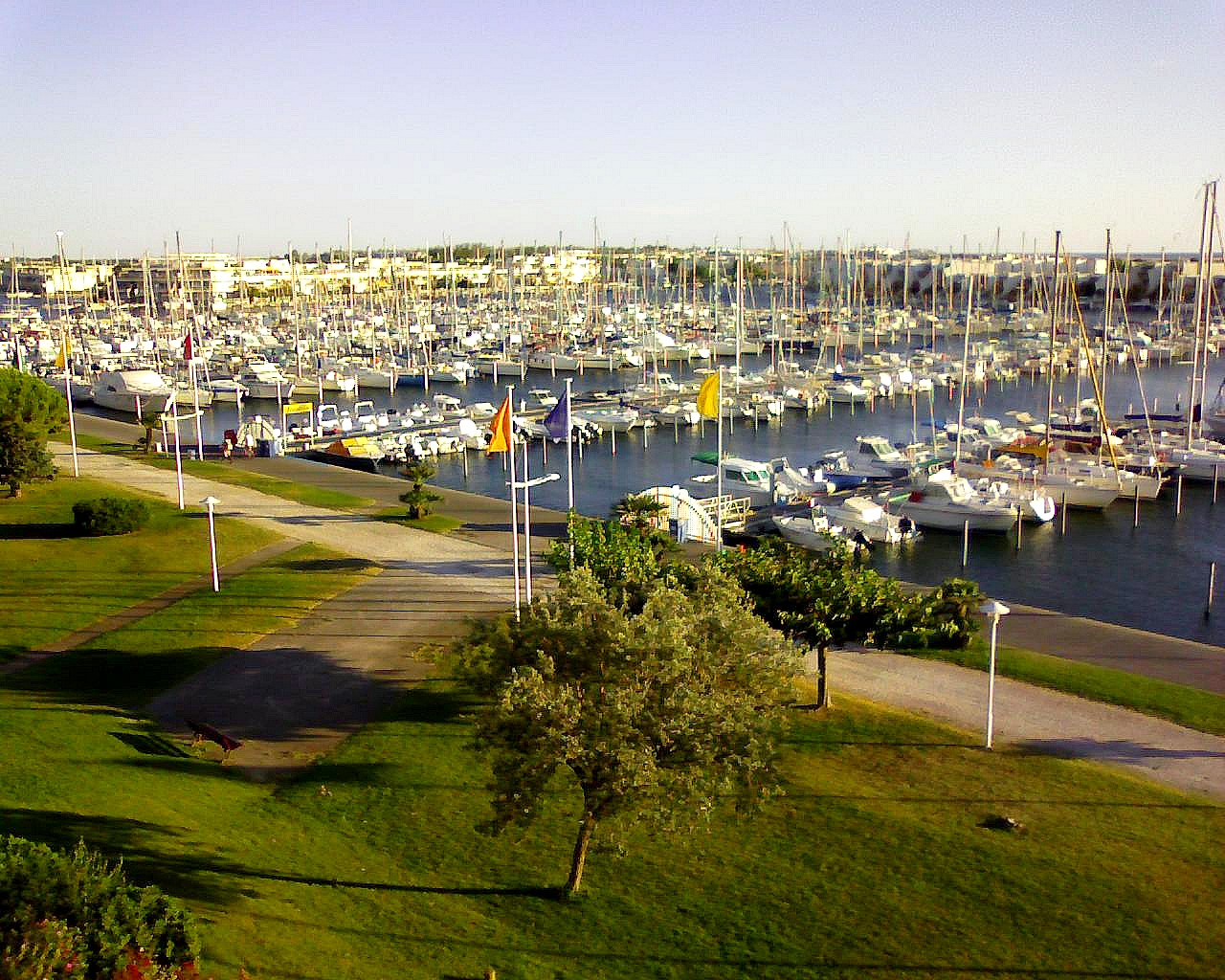
Quai Bougainville

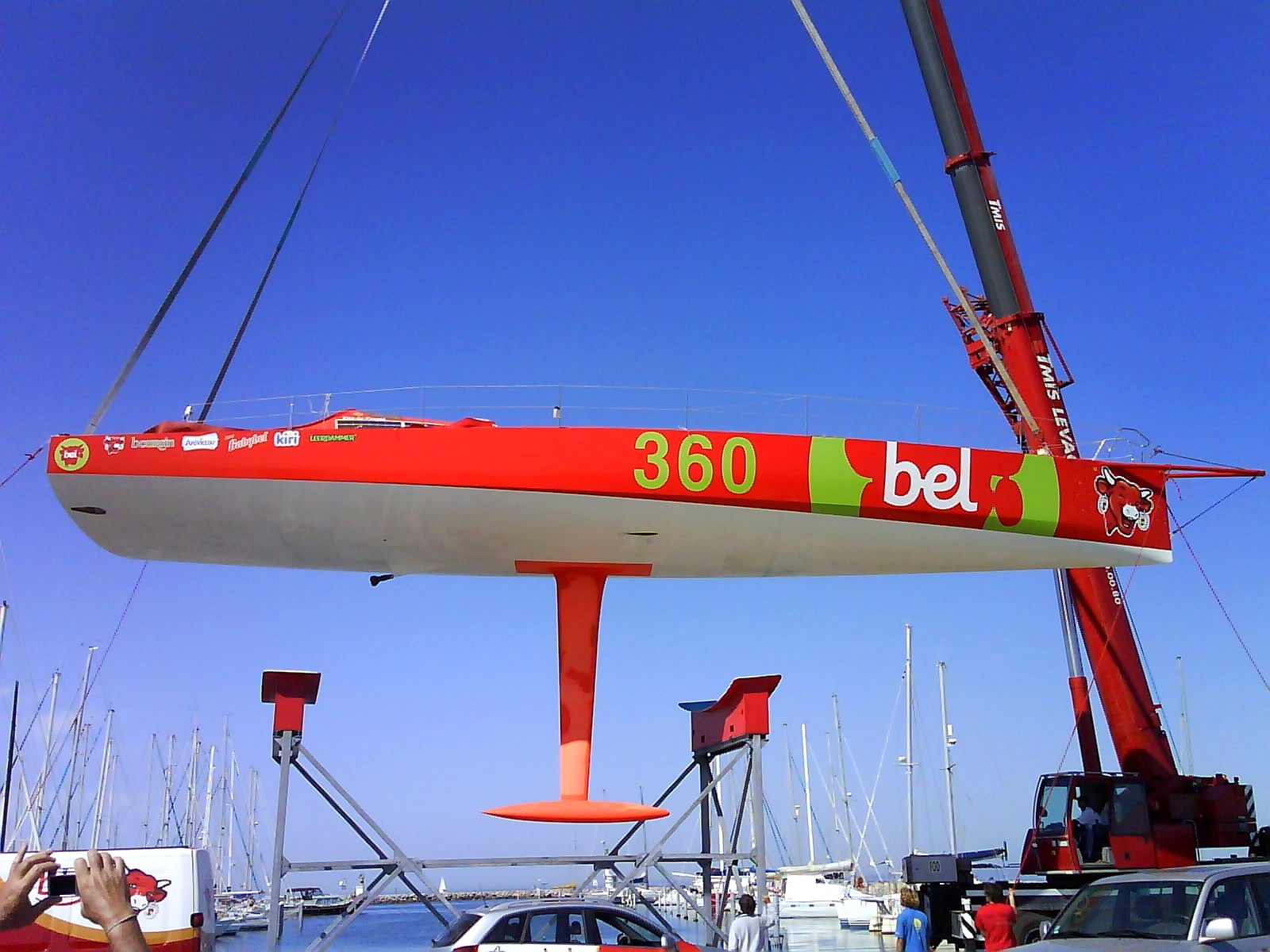
Mise à l'eau du Groupe Bel

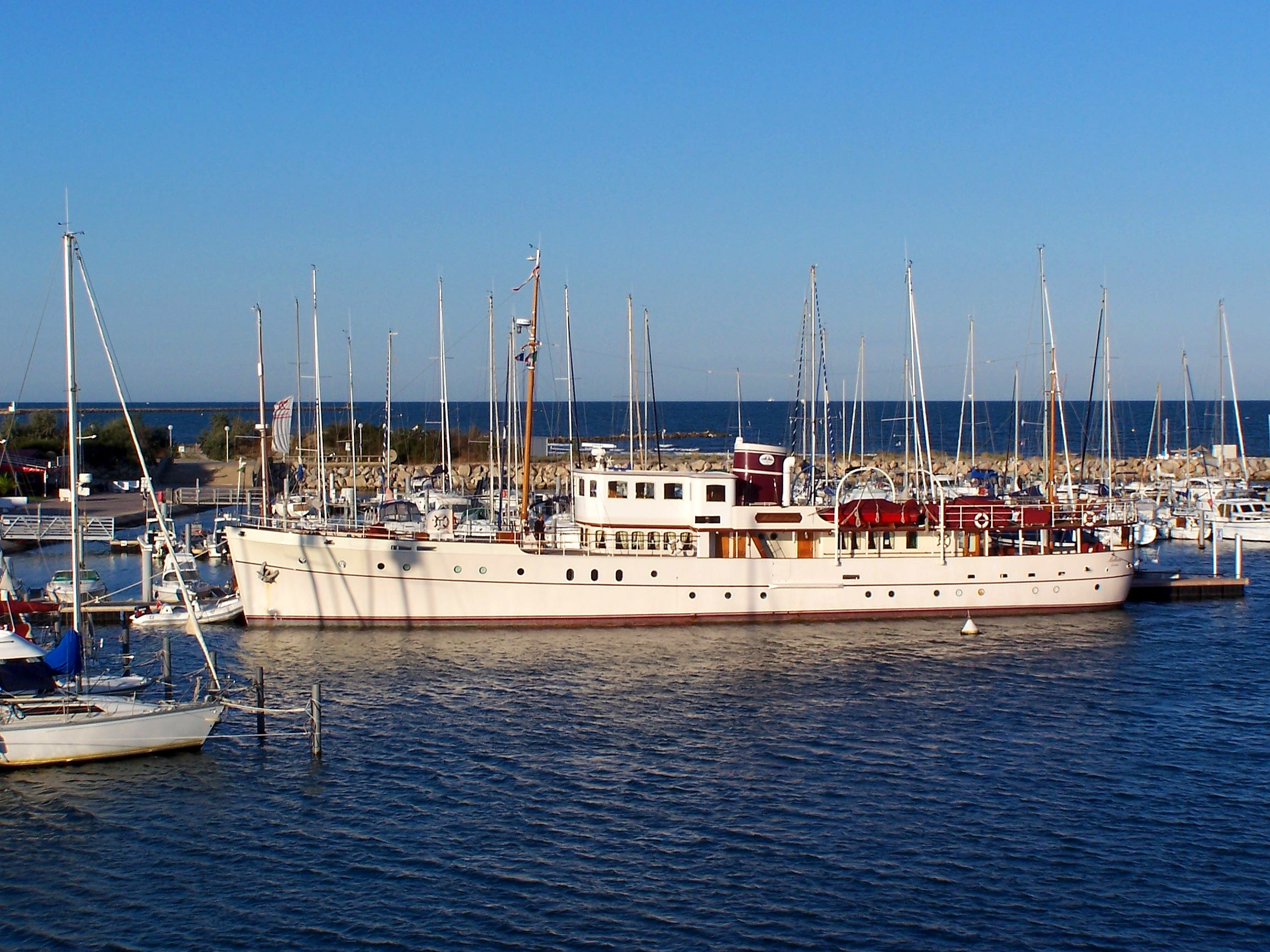
Le Meltemi à Port Camargue
