= Jehanne Collard =

French lawyer and activist (1950–2021)

- Born: 13 August 1950; Marseille, France
- Died: 18 April 2021 (aged 70); Paris, France
- Occupation: Lawyer

Jehanne Collard (13 August 1950 – 18 April 2021) was a French lawyer and activist. She focused on the rights of crime victims and damage to private property. She served as vice-president of the Fondation Anne Cellier, founded in 1987 to fight for road traffic safety.

== Biography ==
Jehanne was born in 1950 to Georges Collard and Odette Tarrazi. Her brother, Gilbert Collard, is a politician currently serving in the European Parliament. She had three children: Maya, Romy, and Eva.

Collard began her career in 1977 in the family rights domain. Particularly, she defended the rights of divorced fathers, who were often unable to visit their children. Following a serious traffic accident in 1993, she devoted her career to defending victims of accidents. She became a media personality, appearing on television and radio shows and led protests for road safety. In 2018, she represented the victims of the Perpignan crash, which occurred on 14 December 2017 when a train collided with a school bus, killing six and injuring 14 children.

Jehanne Collard died in Paris on 18 April 2021 at the age of 70.

== Publications ==
- Victimes de la route : vos droits (1996)
- Assurés, si vous saviez... Quand l'État se fait complice des compagnies... (1997)
- Victimes : les oubliés de la justice (1998)
- Malades, si vous saviez... les scandales des hôpitaux... (2000)
- Le Scandale de l'insécurité routière; à qui profite le crime ? (2001)
- Accidentés de la route, vos droits (2003)
- Ma vie a commencé dans un fracas de tôles (2005)
- Victimes, défendez-vous, Le guide des accidentés (2007)
- La Peine de naître (2008)

== Distinctions ==
- Knight of the Ordre national du Mérite (2004)
- Knight of the Legion of Honour (2007)
