= Le Grau-du-Roi =

- Commune
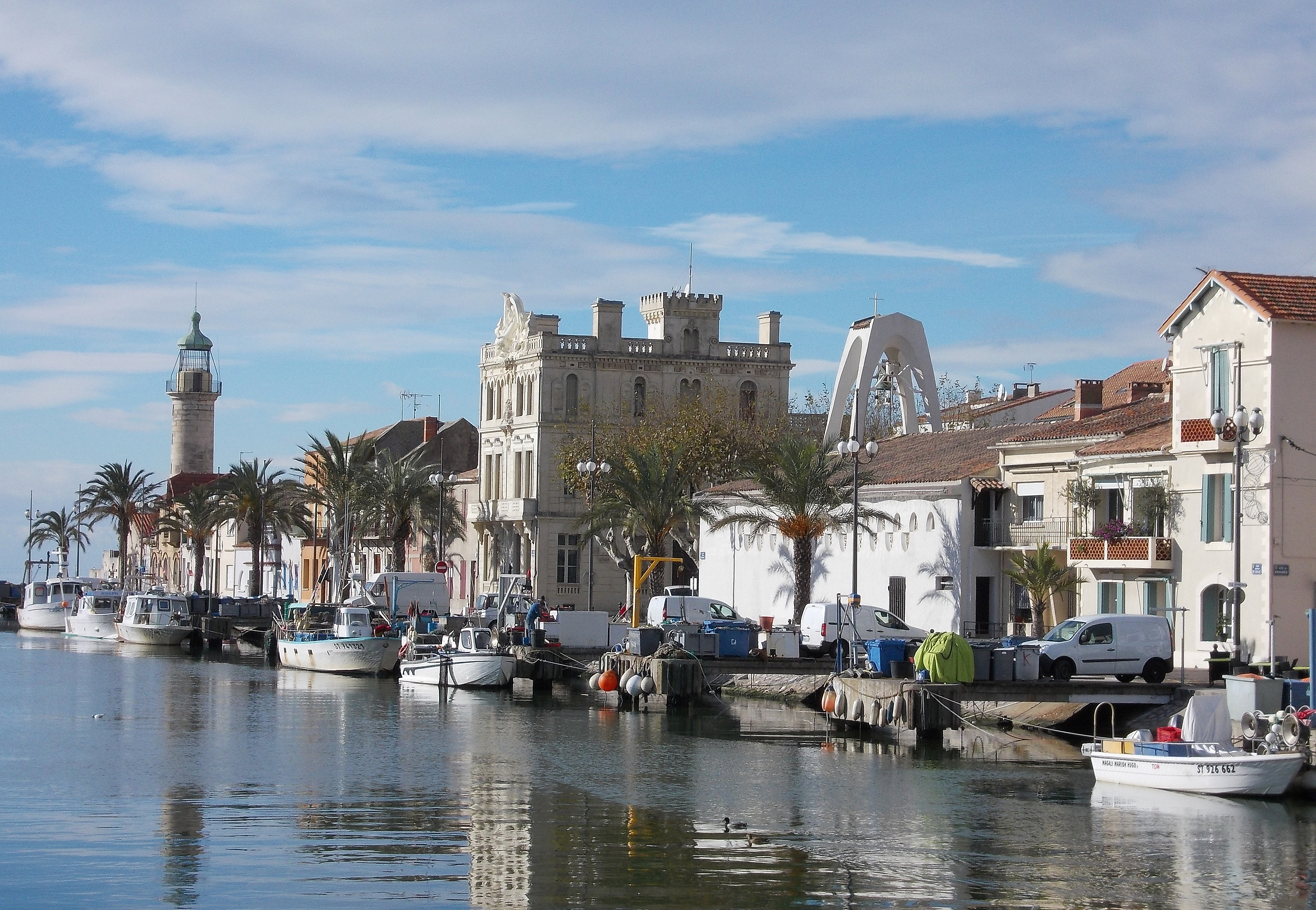
- A view of the port of Le Grau-du-Roi

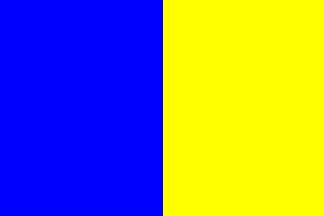
- Flag Coat of arms
- Location of Le Grau-du-Roi
- Location within France Location within Occitanie
- Coordinates: 43°32′17″N 4°08′14″E
- Country: France
- Region: Occitania
- Department: Gard
- Arrondissement: Nîmes
- Canton: Aigues-Mortes
- Intercommunality: Terre de Camargue

Government
  - Mayor (2020–2026): Robert Crauste
- Area^{1}: 54.73 km^{2} (21.13 sq mi)
- Elevation: 1 m (3.3 ft)
- Highest elevation: 5 m (16 ft)
- Lowest elevation: 0 m (0 ft)
- Population (2023): 8,588
  - Density: 156.9/km^{2} (406.4/sq mi)
- Demonym(s): Graulen (masculine); Graulenne (feminine)
- Time zone: UTC+01:00 (CET)
  - Summer (DST): UTC+02:00 (CEST)
- INSEE/Postal code: 30133 /30240
- ^{1} French Land Register data, which excludes lakes, ponds, glaciers > 1 km^{2} (0.386 sq mi or 247 acres) and river estuaries.

Le Grau-du-Roi (French pronunciation: [lə ɡʁo dy ʁwa]; Occitan: Lo Grau dau Rei) is a commune in the Gard department in southern France. It is the only commune in Gard to have a frontage on the Mediterranean. To the west is the Herault department and La Grande-Motte village, and to the east is the Bouches-du-Rhone department. Using the sea as a vantage point, the commune has four distinct sections: the right beach (Plage de Rive Droite), the Village, the left beach (Plage de Rive Gauche), Port-Camargue and L'Espiguette. Immediately landwards are the large shallow étangs, saline marshes, which separate it from Aigues Mortes, a neighboring mediaeval walled city that used to be a port. The étangs are home to numerous flamingoes.

== Etymology ==
Le Grau-du-Roi comes from the Occitan word grau (Latin gradus), which refers to the opening of an étang (shallow saline lake), or the watercourse from an etang into the sea. It is roughly equivalent to the usage of the English term bayou. Roi is the French word for King. Aigues-Mortes means literally 'dead water', aigues coming from the Latin aqua.

== Geography ==
Le Grau-du-Roi is south of Aigues-Mortes, in the Gard department. It is in the canton of Aigues-Mortes. It is separated from Aigues-Mortes by a series of saline marshes, called étangs in French, and a bend in the river Vidourle. The étangs are named as follows: l'étang du Ponant, l'étang du Médard, l'étang du Repausset Levant, and the lac de Salonique, which is a lake rather than a marsh, as its name suggests. To the west of the town, the coastal strip is breached where the Vidourle empties into the Mediterranean, and to the east is that of the Petit Rhone. The course of these two rivers has been subject to change and reversal. The Rhone used to flow into the étangs further to the west and at one point, the Vidourle flowed into it rather than the sea, The route in the 12th century was through the Grau Louis and the Old Channel. In 1570, a new breach occurred at a point called Gagne-Petit. It is around this grau that the settlement was formed. The area between the étangs and the sea was settled by Italian immigrants at the end of the 19th century. From then until the 1920s, the economy was based entirely on fishing, but tourism later became important, culminating in the construction of Port-Camargue. Le Grau-du-Roi station has rail connections to Nîmes.

The modern-day resort town benefits from 18 km of fine sand beaches, with sand dunes on the Pointe de Éspiguette forming an important wildlife habitat. The étangs are noted for their birds, which include flamingoes.

=== Climate ===
Le Grau-du-Roi has a hot-summer Mediterranean climate (Köppen climate classification Csa). The average annual temperature in Le Grau-du-Roi is 15.0 °C (59.0 °F). The average annual rainfall is 574.5 mm (22.62 in) with October as the wettest month. The temperatures are highest on average in July, at around 23.5 °C (74.3 °F), and lowest in January, at around 7.3 °C (45.1 °F). The highest temperature ever recorded in Le Grau-du-Roi was 38.0 °C (100.4 °F) on 16 August 1987; the coldest temperature ever recorded was −11.0 °C (12.2 °F) on 12 January 1987.

Climate data for Le Grau-du-Roi (1981−2010 normals, extremes 1979−2010)
| Month | Jan | Feb | Mar | Apr | May | Jun | Jul | Aug | Sep | Oct | Nov | Dec | Year |
|---|---|---|---|---|---|---|---|---|---|---|---|---|---|
| Record high °C (°F) | 20.3 (68.5) | 21.0 (69.8) | 24.7 (76.5) | 28.8 (83.8) | 32.0 (89.6) | 37.4 (99.3) | 37.0 (98.6) | 38.0 (100.4) | 34.0 (93.2) | 29.5 (85.1) | 22.8 (73.0) | 20.0 (68.0) | 38.0 (100.4) |
| Mean daily maximum °C (°F) | 11.0 (51.8) | 12.0 (53.6) | 15.0 (59.0) | 17.5 (63.5) | 21.2 (70.2) | 25.6 (78.1) | 28.3 (82.9) | 28.0 (82.4) | 24.3 (75.7) | 20.1 (68.2) | 14.8 (58.6) | 11.7 (53.1) | 19.2 (66.6) |
| Daily mean °C (°F) | 7.3 (45.1) | 8.0 (46.4) | 10.8 (51.4) | 13.4 (56.1) | 17.0 (62.6) | 20.9 (69.6) | 23.5 (74.3) | 23.2 (73.8) | 19.8 (67.6) | 16.2 (61.2) | 11.2 (52.2) | 8.1 (46.6) | 15.0 (59.0) |
| Mean daily minimum °C (°F) | 3.5 (38.3) | 4.0 (39.2) | 6.6 (43.9) | 9.3 (48.7) | 12.8 (55.0) | 16.2 (61.2) | 18.6 (65.5) | 18.4 (65.1) | 15.2 (59.4) | 12.3 (54.1) | 7.6 (45.7) | 4.5 (40.1) | 10.8 (51.4) |
| Record low °C (°F) | −11.0 (12.2) | −6.5 (20.3) | −4.9 (23.2) | 2.0 (35.6) | 4.0 (39.2) | 7.5 (45.5) | 10.5 (50.9) | 10.0 (50.0) | 6.0 (42.8) | 2.0 (35.6) | −3.6 (25.5) | −7.0 (19.4) | −11.0 (12.2) |
| Average precipitation mm (inches) | 55.4 (2.18) | 45.6 (1.80) | 34.0 (1.34) | 53.9 (2.12) | 40.1 (1.58) | 23.5 (0.93) | 13.9 (0.55) | 32.0 (1.26) | 69.1 (2.72) | 88.6 (3.49) | 64.3 (2.53) | 54.1 (2.13) | 574.5 (22.62) |
| Average precipitation days (≥ 1.0 mm) | 5.4 | 4.6 | 4.6 | 5.7 | 5.1 | 3.1 | 1.7 | 3.1 | 4.4 | 6.2 | 6.2 | 6.1 | 56.1 |
Source: Météo-France

== History ==
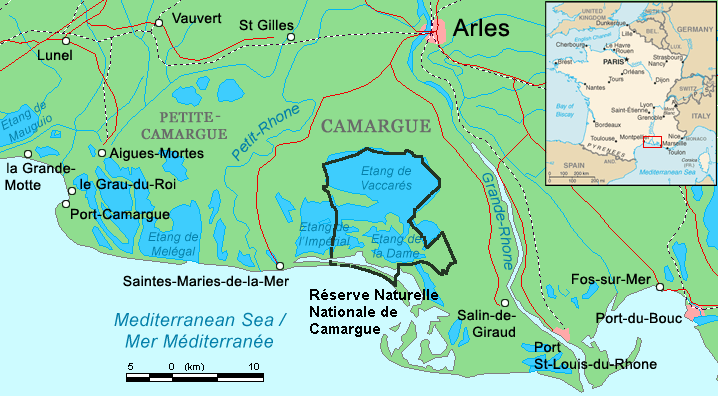
Showing Le Grau-du-Roi in the context of the entire Rhone delta

The city of Aigues-Mortes gained importance during the crusades when it was a royal port. King Louis IX of France had no other port available to him on the Mediterranean. Ships docked alongside the ramparts of the city and passed through a circuitous channel, (the Old Channel) through the Étang de Repausset to the sea at Grau Louis (La Grande Motte). In 1570, a storm surge from the Rhone entered the etang and breached the coastal strip forming a new grau. A six-kilometre channel was created from the city directly to the sea. In 1640 this was named the Grau du Roi, and although the name changed several times afterwards, it eventually reverted to its current name. In 1772 two breakwaters were constructed out of stone. After much subsequent work, it became a canal in 1845.

There was an old lighthouse in the village which got a new copper lantern in 1828, and a second was constructed at l´Espiguette in 1867.

The village, based around fishing cottages, gained administrative buildings and was recognised as a section of Aigues-Mortes in 1867, becoming a separate commune in 1879. The village of fishers and farmers turned to tourism at the end of the 19th century, with the extension of the Nîmes Aigues-Mortes railway line in 1909: bathers arrived en masse, and on the 26 April 1924 the French President of the Republic decreed that Le Grau-du-Roi was a "station climatique et balnéaire" (beach resort town). The rail line enabled local producers to market their white grapes and fish nationally.

World War II affected the village profoundly. Axis troops were stationed in the village, and the local council dissolved. By 1942, many of the inhabitants had fled: the coast was on the front line and bristled with tank traps and minefields. The village was controlled by blockhouses, and the canal was shut off. Wood from houses was used to build defences. Le Grau-du-Roi was liberated in August 1944, and the coast started to rebuild, with a focus on tourism. The effort was coordinated by the plan Racine. Architect Jean Balladur was put in charge, and he designed structures capable of supporting a large number of tourists, while also supporting the local way of life and environment. Part of the plan included the new marina at Port-Camargue. This was launched in 1968 and finished in 1985.

== Sports ==
The local football club in Le Grau-du-Roi is Émulation Sportive du Grau-du-Roi. They are an amateur team, and play at the Stade Michel Mézy (named after Michel Mézy) in the town.

== International relations ==
Le Grau-du-Roi is twinned with:

- Dossenheim, Germany

== Notable people ==
- Jacques Philippe Mareschal, 18th-century Royal engineer
- Michèle Torr (born 1947), singer and author
- Stéphane Mellino, member of the band Les Négresses Vertes
- Jean-Pierre Cassel (1932–2007), actor
- Michel Mézy (born 1948), footballer
- François Vérove (died 2021), serial killer

== Population ==
Historical population
| Year | Pop. | ±% p.a. |
|---|---|---|
| 1968 | 3,354 | — |
| 1975 | 3,963 | +2.41% |
| 1982 | 4,152 | +0.67% |
| 1990 | 5,253 | +2.98% |
| 1999 | 5,875 | +1.25% |
| 2007 | 8,173 | +4.21% |
| 2012 | 8,498 | +0.78% |
| 2017 | 8,517 | +0.04% |
| 2023 | 8,588 | +0.14% |
Source: INSEE

== Literary references ==
The first part of Ernest Hemingway's The Garden of Eden is set in Le Grau-du-Roi. He writes of Le Grau-du-Roi:

"This is a fine place below Aigues Mortes on the Camargue and the Mediterranean with a long beach and a fine fishing port."

Ernest Hemingway, 27 Mai 1927 (correspondance à Maxwell Perkins)

Le Grau-du-Roi is mentioned in passing in the novel "Perfume" by Patrick Suskind published in 1985 as a place the anti-hero Grenouille passes through

== Gallery ==
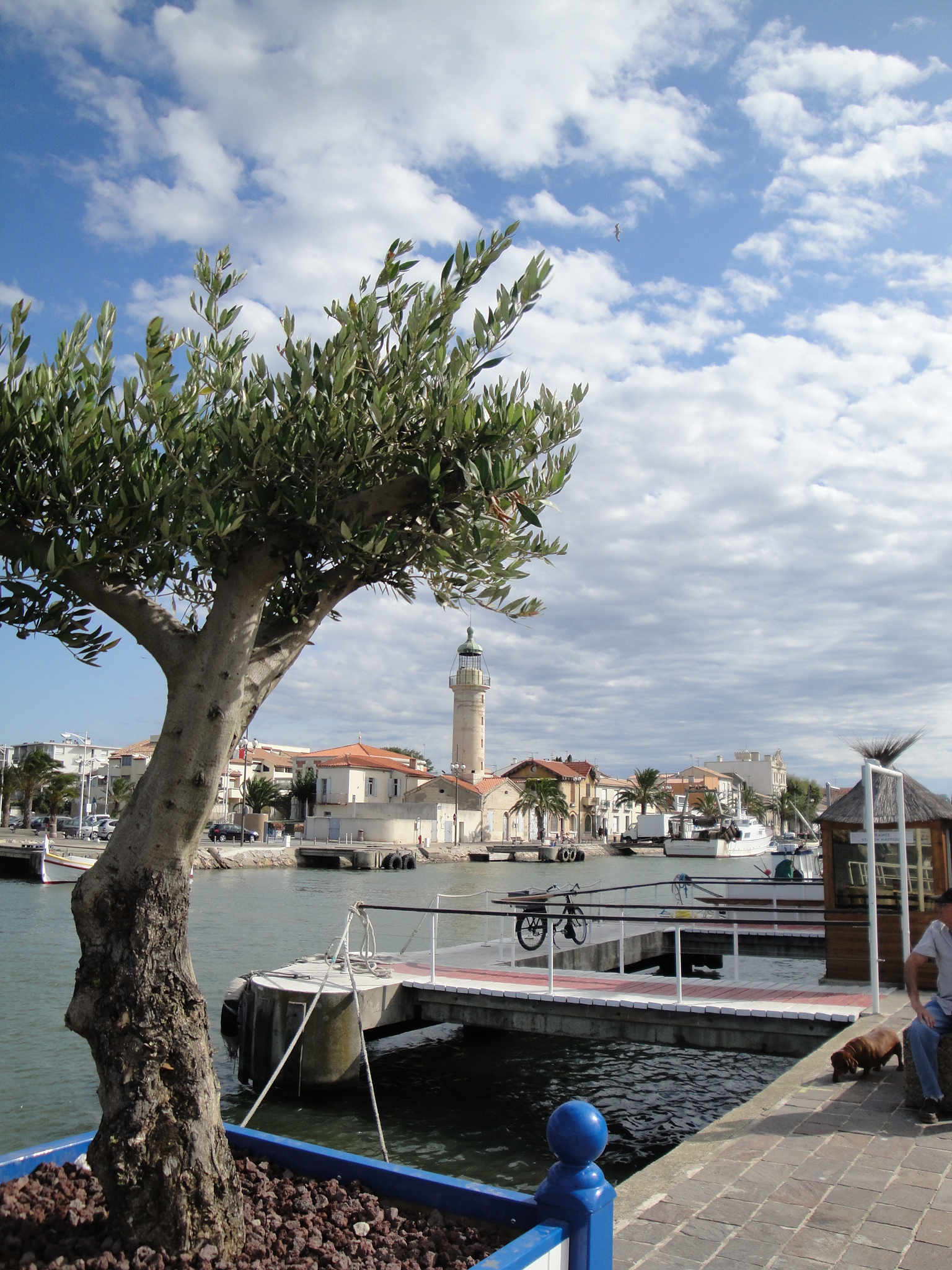

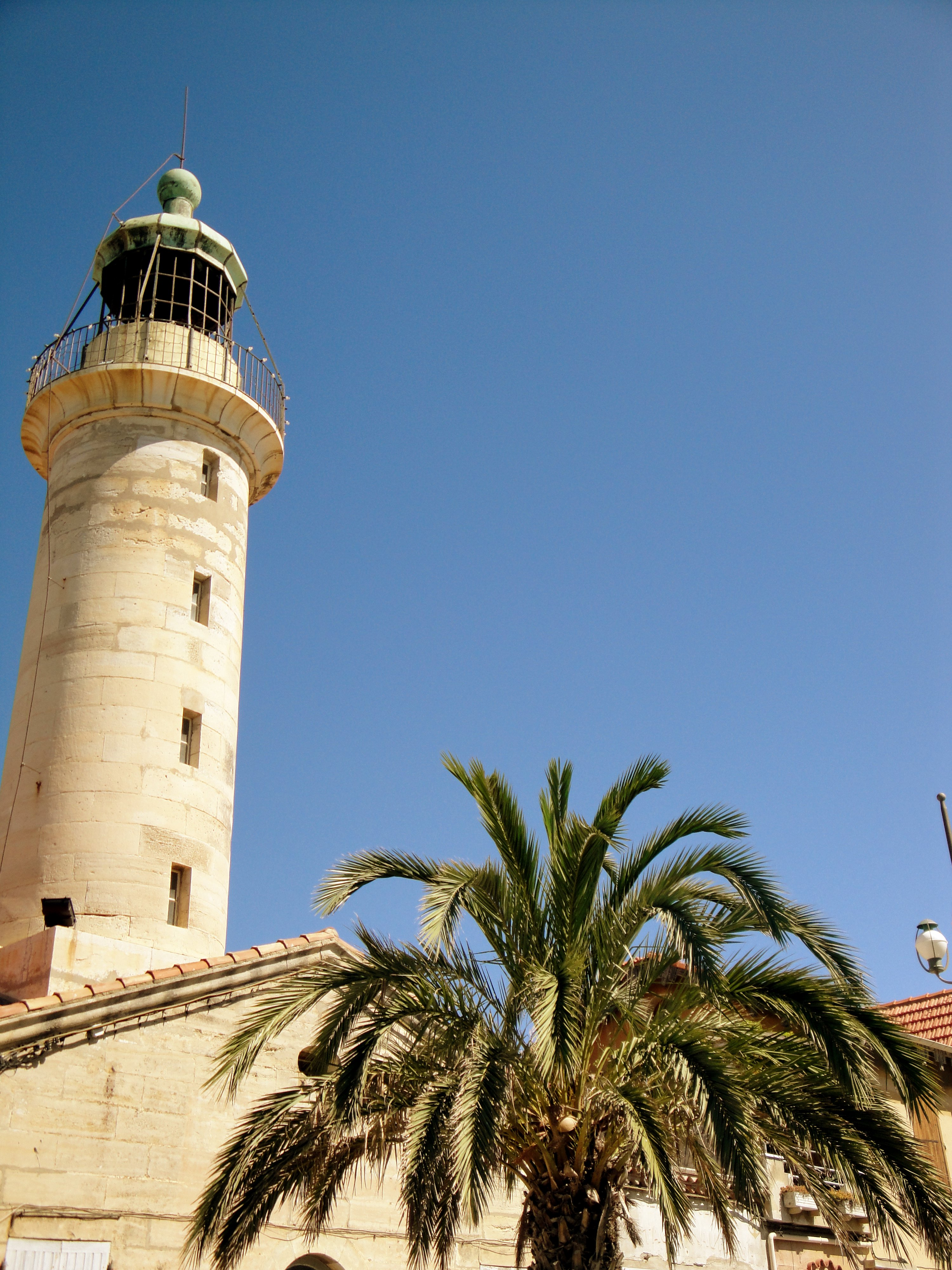

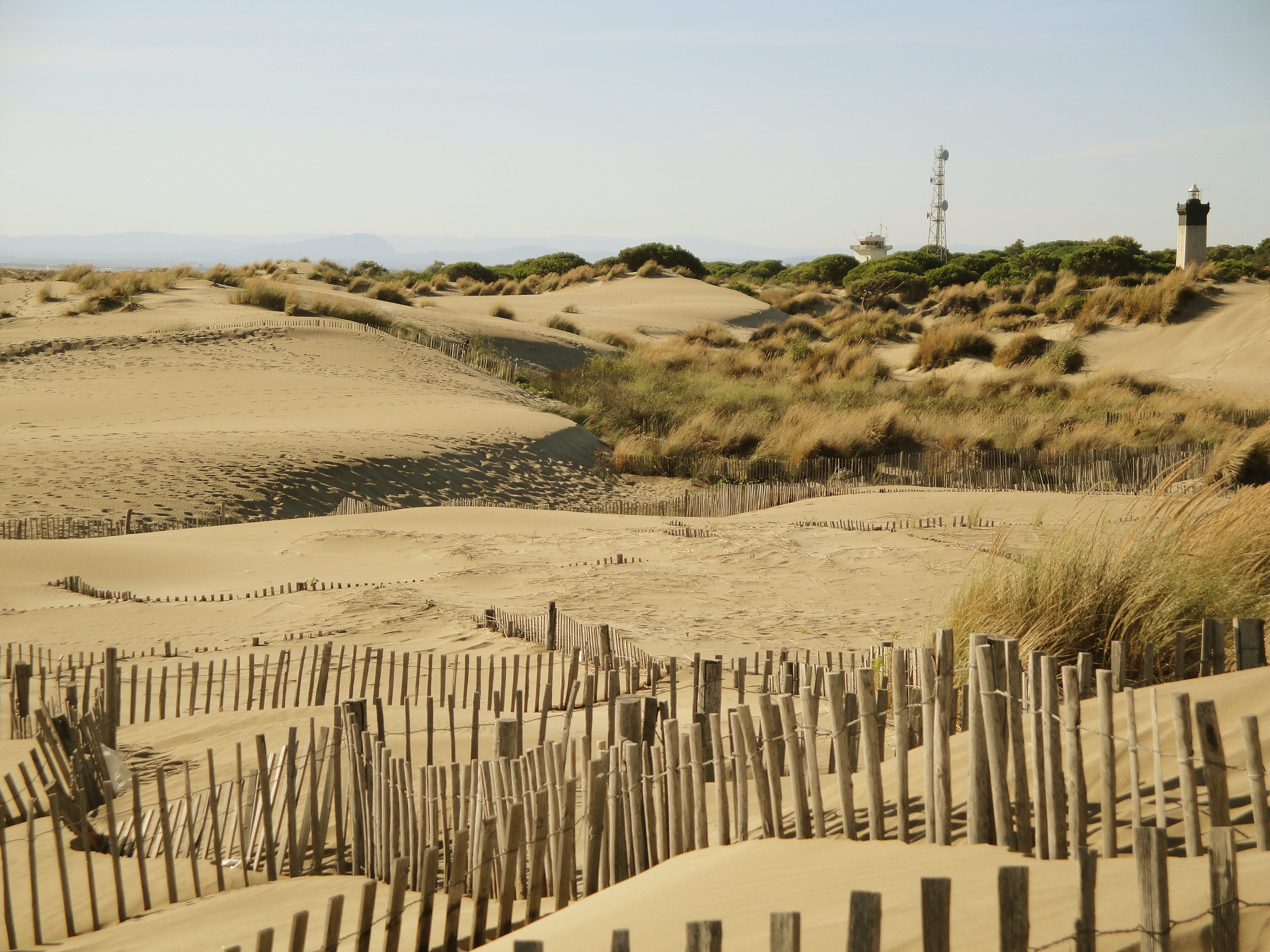

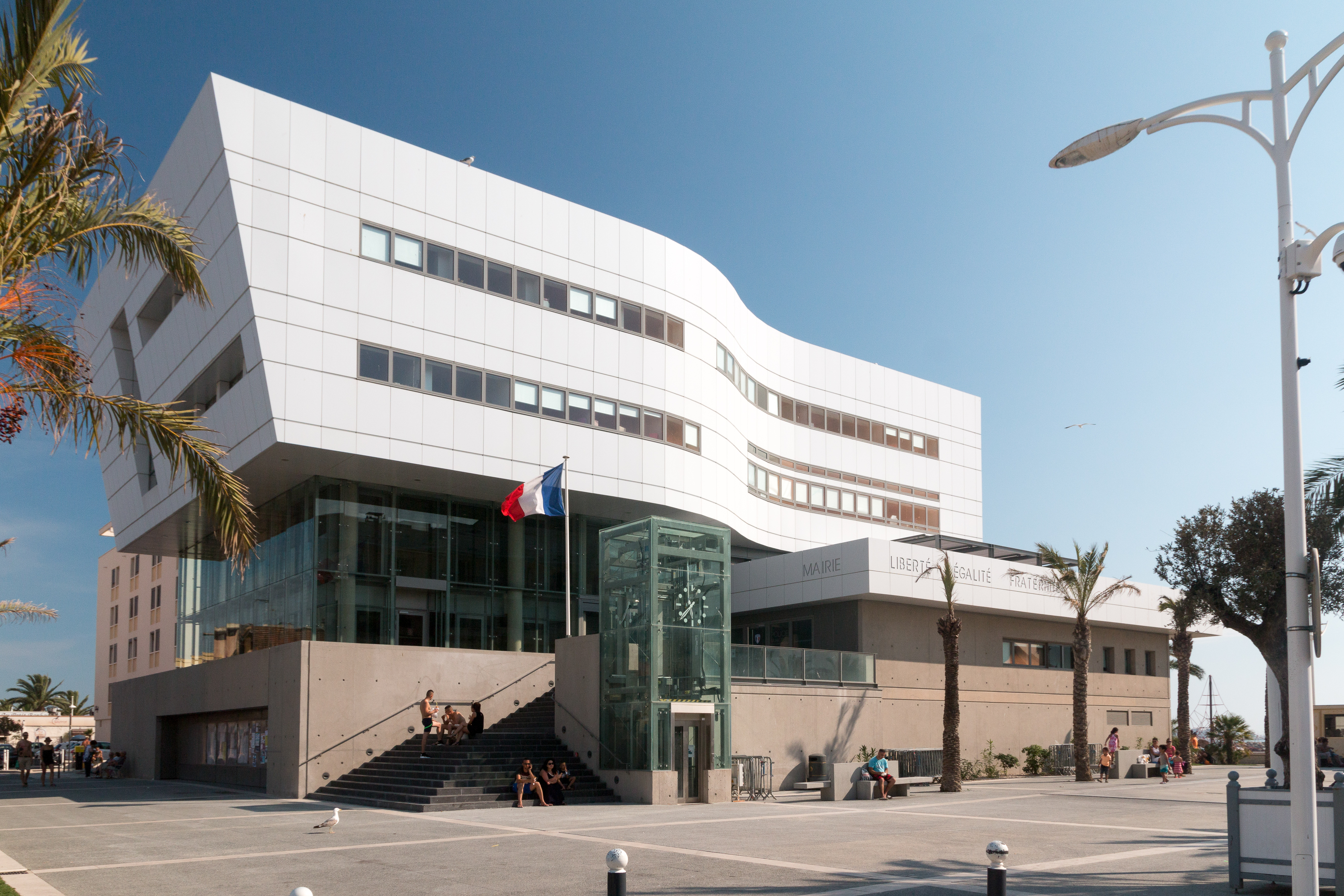
Hôtel de Ville

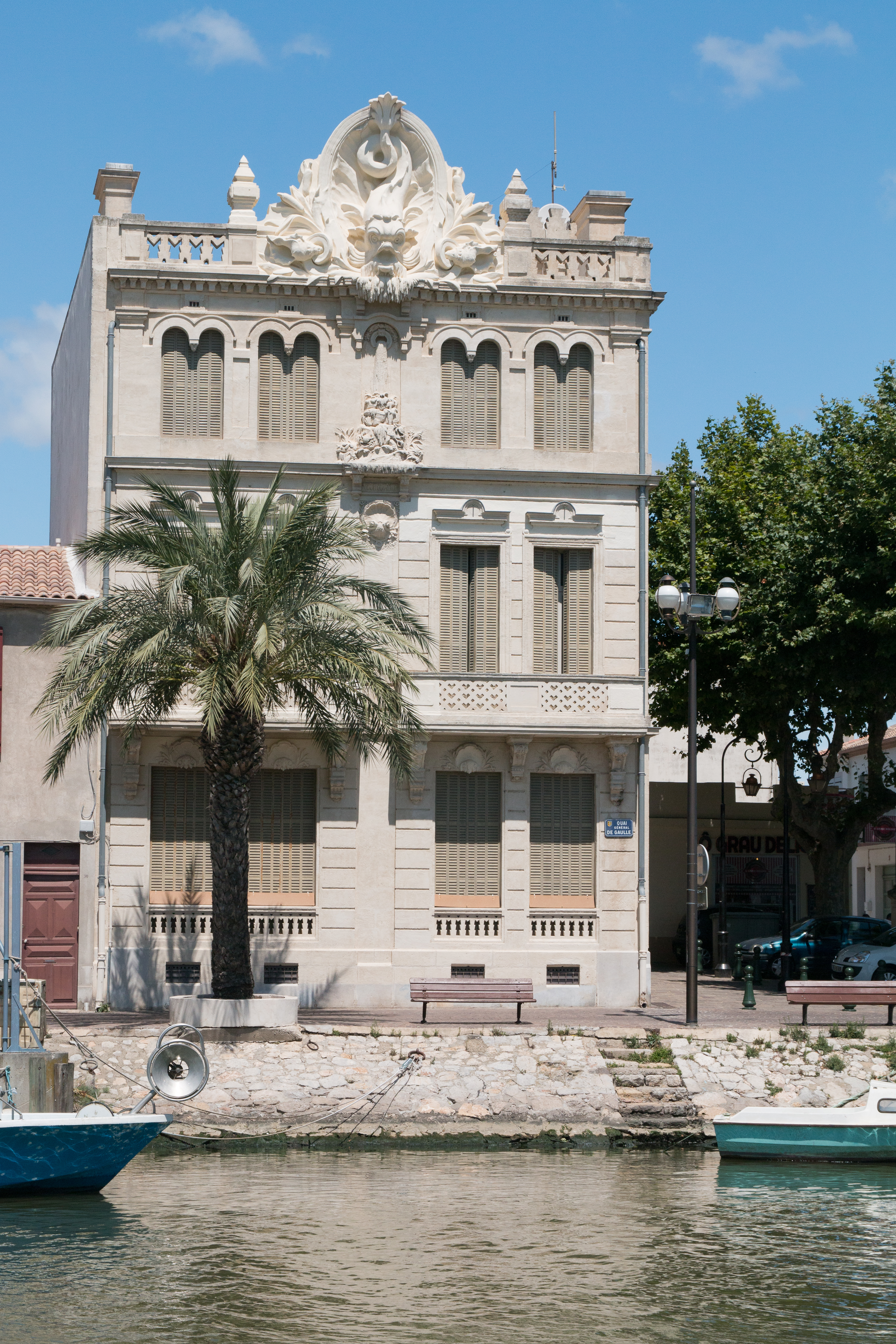
La maison du Dauphin

== See also ==
- Communes of the Gard department
