= Gilbert Collard =

French writer, barrister and politician (born 1948)

Gilbert Collard MEP
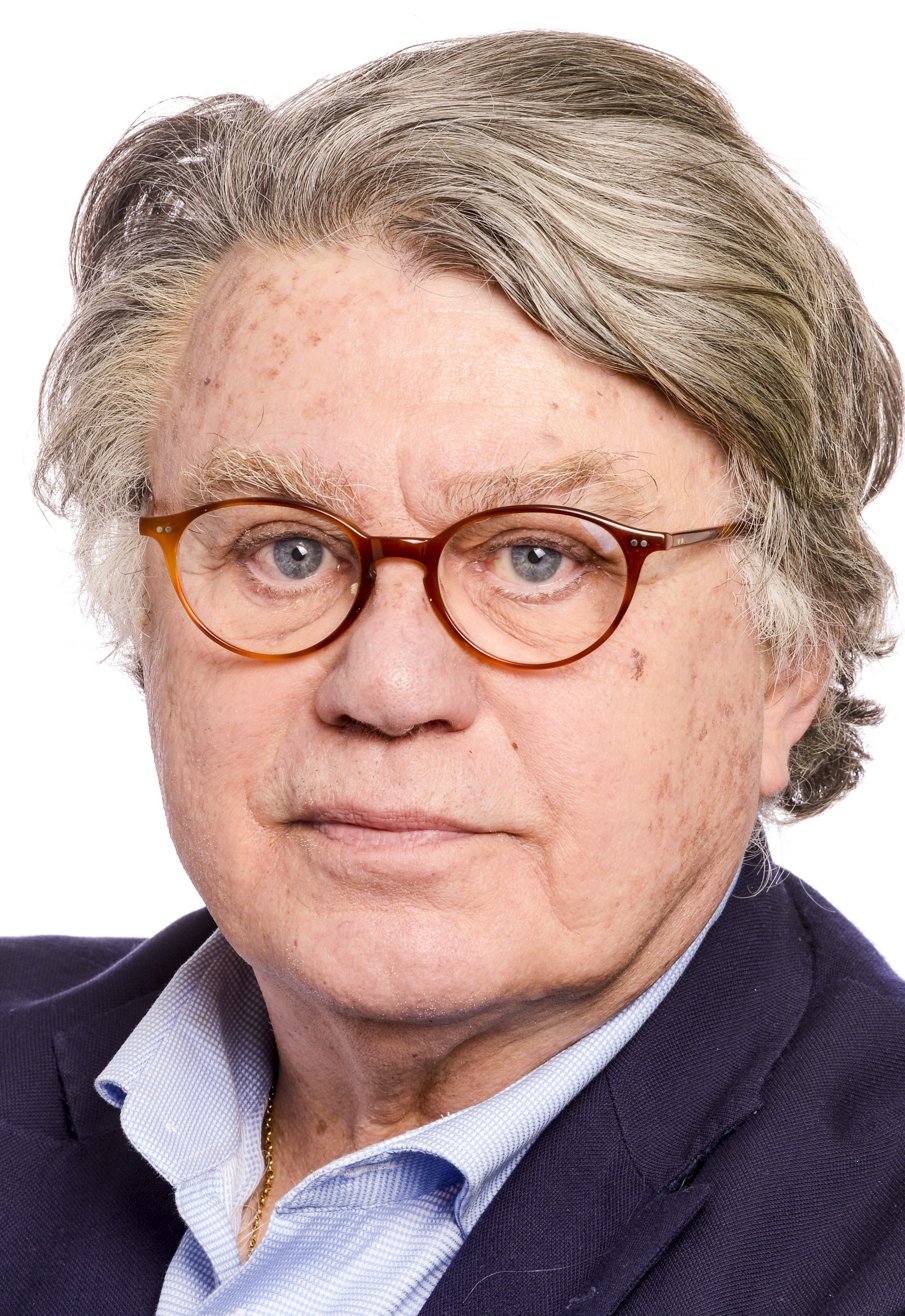
- Collard in 2019

Member of the European Parliament
- Incumbent
- Assumed office 2 July 2019
- Constituency: France

Secretary-General of the Rassemblement bleu Marine
- In office 22 September 2012 – 2017
- Preceded by: Position established
- Succeeded by: Position abolished

Member of the National Assembly for Gard's 2nd constituency
- In office 19 June 2012 – 1 July 2019
- Preceded by: Étienne Mourrut
- Succeeded by: Nicolas Meizonnet

Personal details
- Born: Gilbert Georges Jean Camille René Collard; 3 February 1948 (age 78) Marseille, France
- Party: Reconquête (2022–2023)
- Other political affiliations: French Section of the Workers' International (1964–1969); Socialist Party (1969–1992); Independent (1992–2017); National Rally (2017–2022)
- Spouse: Anne-Marie Collard (m. 1987)
- Education: Aix-Marseille University; Panthéon-Assas University
- Profession: Barrister
- Website: gilbertcollard.fr

Gilbert Georges Jean Camille René Collard (French pronunciation: [ʒilbɛʁ ʒɔʁʒ ʒɑ̃ kamij ʁəne kɔlaʁ]; born 3 February 1948) is a French writer, barrister and politician serving as a Member of the European Parliament (MEP) since 2019. A member of the National Rally (RN) until 2022, he was a member of the National Assembly for the 2nd constituency of Gard from 2012 until 2019. Collard also served as Secretary-General of the Rassemblement bleu Marine (RBM) since 2012, a right-wing political association and think-tank supporting Marine Le Pen. In January 2022, he left the RN for Éric Zemmour's Reconquête.

== Biography ==
=== Early life and education ===
Gilbert Collard was born in Marseille and grew up in Châtel-Guyon. He studied law at Aix-Marseille University and Panthéon-Assas University. During his youth, he was a member of the French Section of the Workers' International (SFIO) and subsequent Socialist Party (PS) until 1992. His sister was lawyer and activist Jehanne Collard (1950–2021).

=== Career and first involvement in politics ===
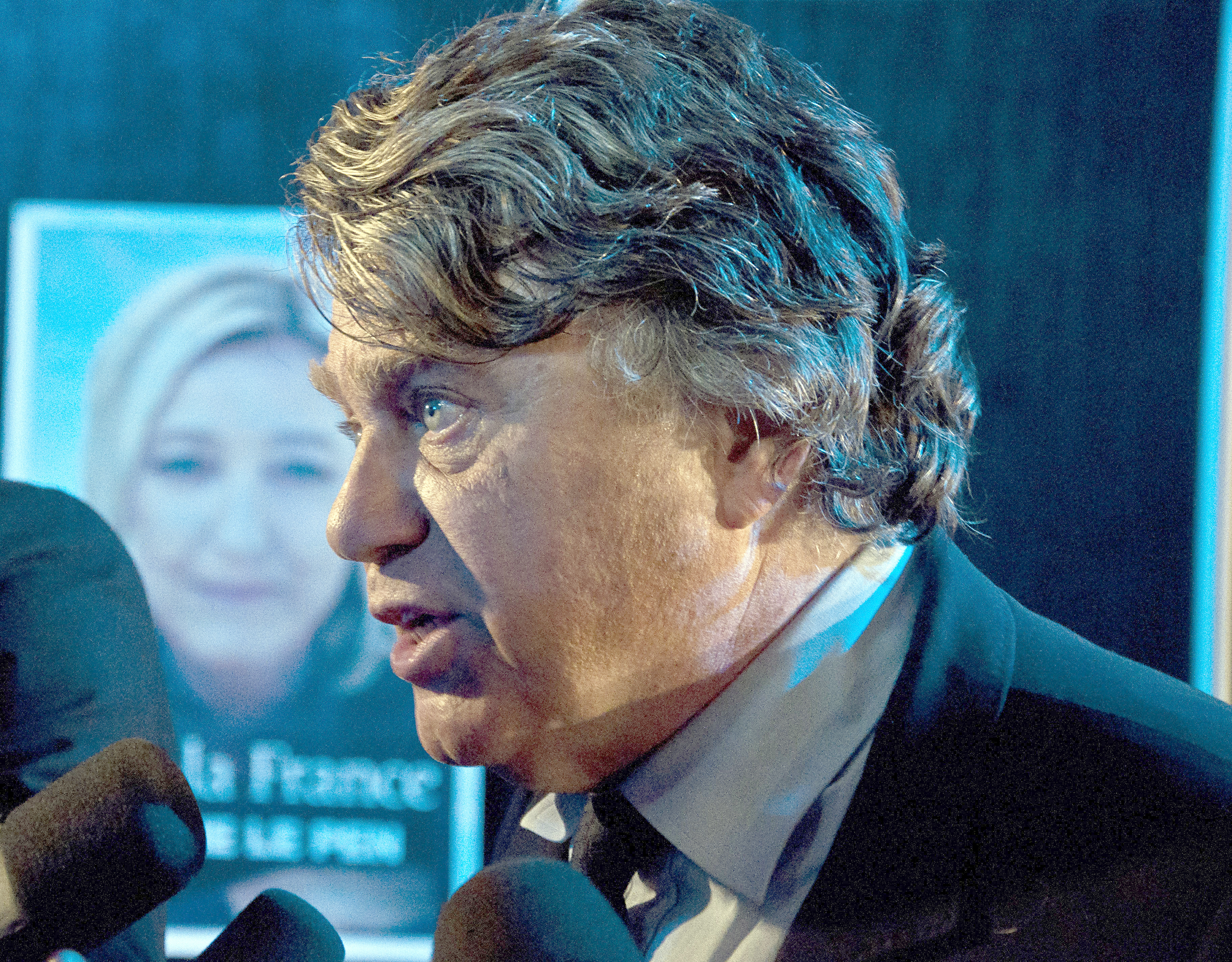
Gilbert Collard speaking to the press on 22 April 2012, the day of the first round of the presidential election, as a supporter of Marine Le Pen.

Collard started his career as a barrister in Marseille in 1971. He quickly became a well-known lawyer at the national level, often speaking in the media about cases he defended. He most notably had Laurent Gbagbo, Charles Pasqua, Marine Le Pen, Valérie Bègue, as well as Paul Aussaresses as clients. In 2001, he was an independent candidate for Mayor of Vichy. He was elected to the city's council but declined the mandate.

=== Member of the National Assembly ===
Collard moved to Gallician, a town in Gard. He was elected to the National Assembly as a member of the RBM in the 2012 legislative election, at the same time as Marion Maréchal-Le Pen in Vaucluse. He succeeded Étienne Mourrut of the Union for a Popular Movement, whom he had defeated.

Along with Marion Maréchal and other FN senior executives, Collard took part in the mass demonstrations against same-sex marriage organized in Paris by La Manif pour tous movement in the first half of 2013.

Since the 2014 municipal election, Collard has been a councillor of Saint-Gilles, Gard.

On 17 April 2017, during a Marine Le Pen rally for the 2017 French presidential election, an anti-fascist disrupter threw a Molotov cocktail towards him; he sustained minor injuries amid a quick reaction by police officers. Gilbert Collard was reelected to the National Assembly in the 2017 legislative election. He officially joined the National Rally, then called National Front, later the same year.

=== Member of the European Parliament ===
Collard stood as a candidate in the 2019 European Parliament election. Following his election he resigned from the National Assembly, where he was succeeded by his substitute Nicolas Meizonnet.

=== Defection to Reconquête ===
On 22 January 2022, Collard along with Jérôme Rivière left the RN for Reconquête, the party of the far-right presidential candidate Éric Zemmour.
