= Gard's 2nd constituency =

Constituency of the National Assembly of France

2nd constituency of Gard
- inline Constituency of the National Assembly of France

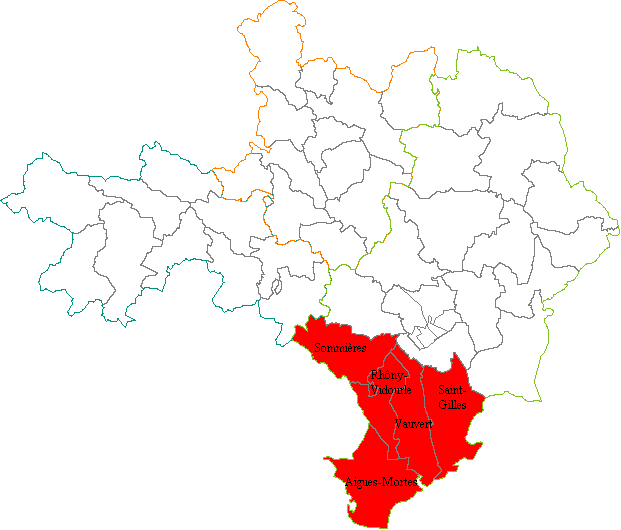
- Location of constituency in Department

- Gard in France
- Deputy: Nicolas Meizonnet; RN
- Department: Gard
- Cantons: Aigues-Mortes, Rhôny-Vidourle, Saint-Gilles, Sommières, Vauvert
- Registered voters: 145,273

The 2nd constituency of Gard is a French legislative constituency in the Gard département.

== Deputies ==
Election	Member	Party	Notes
1988	Jean-Marie Cambacérès	PS	
1993	Jean-Marie André	UDF	
1997	Alain Fabre-Pujol	PS	
2002	Étienne Mourrut	UMP	
2007	Étienne Mourrut	UMP	
2012	Gilbert Collard	FN	
2017	Gilbert Collard	FN	Elected to the European Parliament and thus left National Assembly in January 2019
2020	Nicolas Meizonnet	RN	Substitute, but entry into office delayed by appeal against validity of his election.
2022	Nicolas Meizonnet	RN	
2024	Nicolas Meizonnet	RN	

== Election results ==
=== 2024 ===
Candidate	Party	Alliance	First round			Second round		
Candidate	Party	Alliance	Votes	%	+/–	Votes	%	+/–
Nicolas Meizonnet	RN		34,427	52.22	+16.83			
Katy Guyot	PS	NFP	15,727	23.85				
Sophie Pellegrin Ponsole	HOR	Ensemble	9,300	14.11	-8.94			
Catherine Bolle	LR	UDC	4,155	6.30	-2.42			
Véronique Jullian	EAC		1,841	2.79				
Stéphane Manson	LO		478	0.73	-0.16			
Votes			65,928	100.00				
Valid votes			65,928	97.88	-0.09			
Blank votes			964	1.43	-0.05			
Null votes			465	0.69	+0.14			
Turnout			67,357	69.93	+23.09			
Abstentions			28,962	30.07	-23.09			
Registered voters			96,319					
Result			RN HOLD					

As Nicolas Meizonnet won more that 50% of the vote in the first round, and the turnout was above 50%, he was elected without a run-off.

=== 2022 ===
Legislative Election 2022: Gard's 2nd constituency
Party	Candidate	Votes	%	±%
RN	Nicolas Meizonnet	15,434	35.39	+3.12
HOR (Ensemble)	Yvan Lachaud	10,050	23.05	-9.11
LFI (NUPÉS)	Coralie Ghirardi	9,502	21.79	+5.73
LR (UDC)	Frédéric Touzellier	3,802	8.72	−5.50
REC	Anthony Leroy	2,241	5.14	N/A
DVE	Pierre-Jean Sevilla	912	2.09	N/A
Others	N/A	1,666	3.82	
Turnout		43,607	46.84	−2.92
2nd round result
RN	Nicolas Meizonnet	22,547	56.53	+6.37
HOR (Ensemble)	Yvan Lachaud	17,337	43.47	−6.37
Turnout		39,884	45.81	−2.40
RN hold				

=== 2017 ===
Candidate	Label	First round		Second round	
Candidate	Label	Votes	%	Votes	%
Gilbert Collard	FN	13,991	32.27	19,834	50.16
Marie Sara	MoDem	13,943	32.16	19,711	49.84
Pascale Mourrut	LR	6,165	14.22		
Danielle Floutier	FI	5,665	13.07		
Béatrice Leccia	ECO	1,296	2.99		
Rodolphe Brun	ECO	594	1.37		
Geneviève Bourrely	DLF	502	1.16		
Julie Schlumberger	DIV	384	0.89		
Stéphane Manson	EXG	318	0.73		
Christel Médiavilla	EXD	284	0.66		
Nathalie Juchors	DIV	214	0.49		
Timothy Broadbent	ECO	0	0.00		
Votes		43,356	100.00	39,545	100.00
Valid votes		43,356	97.88	39,545	92.15
Blank votes		608	1.37	2,322	5.41
Null votes		330	0.75	1,048	2.44
Turnout		44,294	49.76	42,915	48.21
Abstentions		44,726	50.24	46,101	51.79
Registered voters		89,020		89,016	
Source: Ministry of the Interior

=== 2012 ===
2012 legislative election in Gard's 2nd constituency
Candidate	Party	First round		Second round	
Candidate	Party	Votes	%	Votes	%
Gilbert Collard	FN	17,826	34.57%	22,780	42.82%
Katy Guyot	PS–EELV	16,948	32.87%	22,110	41.56%
Etienne Mourrut	UMP	12,318	23.89%	8,313	15.63%
Danielle Floutier	FG	2,672	5.18%		
Auguste Victoria	EELV dissident	505	0.98%		
Jacqueline Abello Boyer	??	417	0.81%		
Dorothée Martinerie	DLR	334	0.65%		
James Climent	PP	209	0.41%		
Carole Jourdan	AEI	167	0.32%		
Stéphane Manson	LO	164	0.32%		
Jean-Michel Sposito		0	0.00%		
Valid votes		51,560	98.85%	53,203	98.71%
Spoilt and null votes		598	1.15%	694	1.29%
Votes cast / turnout		52,158	63.36%	53,897	65.48%
Abstentions		30,159	36.64%	28,414	34.52%
Registered voters		82,317	100.00%	82,311	100.00%

=== 2007 ===
Legislative Election 2007: Gard's 2nd constituency
Party	Candidate	Votes	%	±%
UMP	Étienne Mourrut	31,791	48.06	
PS	Robert Crauste	14,592	22.06	
FN	Jean Miclot	5,480	8.29	
MoDem	Claude de Girardi	3,700	5.59	
PCF	Martine Gayraud	3,274	4.95	
Far left	Marie-Lise Chaniac	1,682	2.54	
Others	N/A	5,624		
Turnout		67,362	58.77	
2nd round result
UMP	Étienne Mourrut	38,189	59.47	
PS	Robert Crauste	26,024	40.53	
Turnout		66,397	57.93	
UMP hold				

=== 2002 ===
Legislative Election 2002: Gard's 2nd constituency
Party	Candidate	Votes	%	±%
PS	Alain Fabre Pujol	17,806	27.86	
FN	Florence Berthezene	13,895	21.74	
UMP	Étienne Mourrut	13,288	20.79	
DVD	Jean-Marie André	11,225	17.57	
UDF	Samuel Serre	1,635	2.56	
Others	N/A	6,054		
Turnout		65,335	63.87	
2nd round result
UMP	Étienne Mourrut	25,649	42.05	
PS	Alain Fabre Pujol	22,770	37.33	
FN	Florence Berthezene	12,582	20.63	
Turnout		62,408	61.01	
UMP gain from PS				

=== 1997 ===
Legislative Election 1997: Gard's 2nd constituency
Party	Candidate	Votes	%	±%
UDF	Jean-Marie André	16,390	27.42	
FN	Max Janin	15,224	25.47	
PS	Alain Fabre-Pujol	12,829	21.46	
PCF	Martine Finiel-Gayraud	8,831	14.77	
DVE	Michel Gaini	1,360	2.28	
DVD	Nadine Braud	1,260	2.11	
Others	N/A	3,883		
Turnout		62,680	67.73	
2nd round result
PS	Alain Fabre-Pujol	27,736	41.74	
UDF	Jean-Marie André	26,203	39.43	
FN	Max Janin	12,517	18.84	
Turnout		68,620	74.16	
PS gain from UDF				

== Sources ==
- French Interior Ministry results website: "Résultats électoraux officiels en France" (in French).
