= Nicolas Meizonnet =

French politician (born 1983)

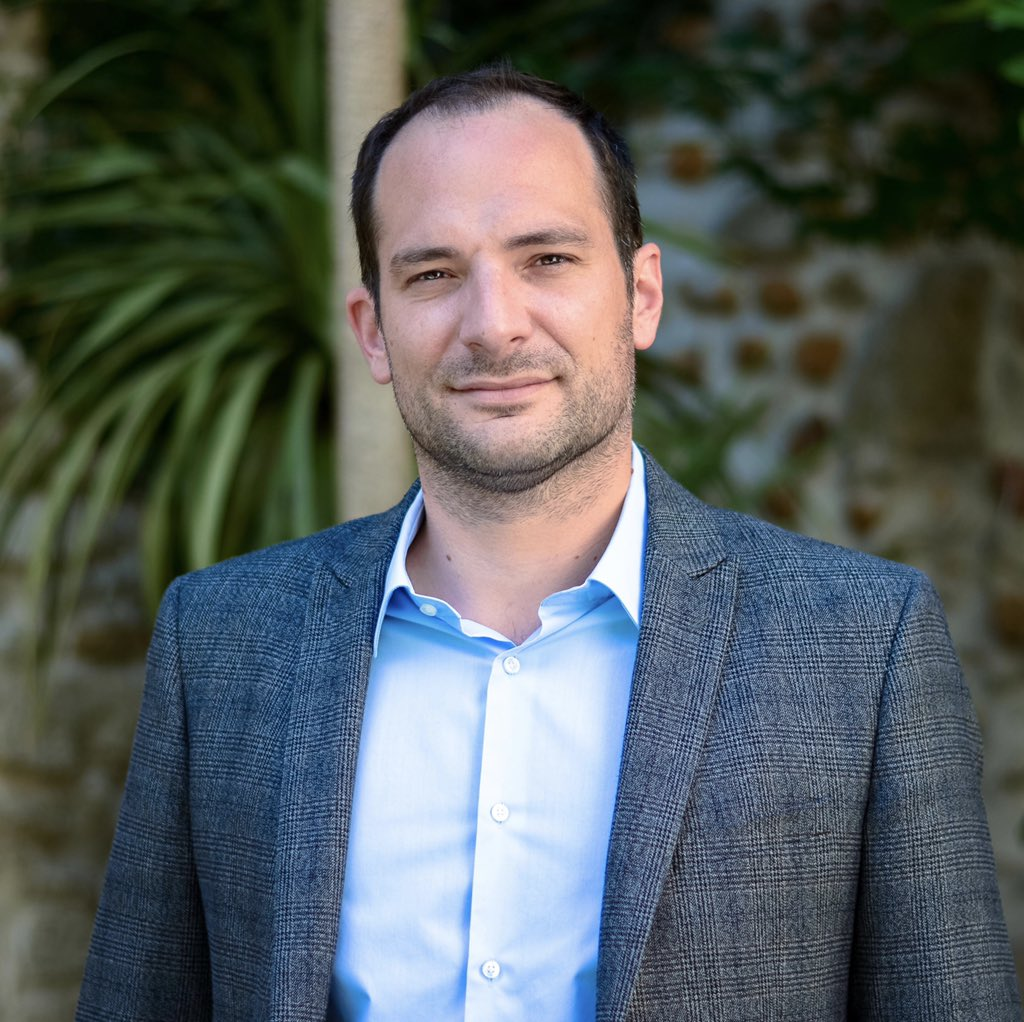

Member of the National Assembly for Gard's 2nd constituency
- Incumbent
- Assumed office 1 February 2020
- Preceded by: Gilbert Collard

Personal details
- Born: Nicolas Jérôme Grégoire Meizonnet-Bérenguier; 22 December 1983 (age 42) Nîmes, France
- Party: National Rally
- Education: Montpellier 2 University
- Occupation: Engineer

Nicolas Jérôme Grégoire Meizonnet-Bérenguier (born 22 December 1983) is a French politician serving as the member of the National Assembly for the 2nd constituency of Gard since 1 February 2020. A member of the National Rally (RN), he has also been a departmental councillor of Gard for the canton of Vauvert since 2 April 2015.

== Political career ==
The son of Jean-Louis Meizonnet, a municipal councillor of Vauvert and regional councillor of Occitanie, Nicolas Meizonnet is an engineer by occupation.

Meizonnet served as a municipal councillor of Vauvert from 8 December 2014 to 28 June 2020. He was elected to the Departmental Council of Gard in the 2015 election. Meizonnet became a member of the National Assembly after Gilbert Collard was elected to the European Parliament. As his substitute, Meizonnet took his place in the National Assembly.

In the 2024 snap legislative election, Meizonnet was reelected with 52% of votes in the first round.
