= Pointe de l'Espiguette =

Dune system in France

Coordinates: 43°29′15.8″N 4°08′30.2″E

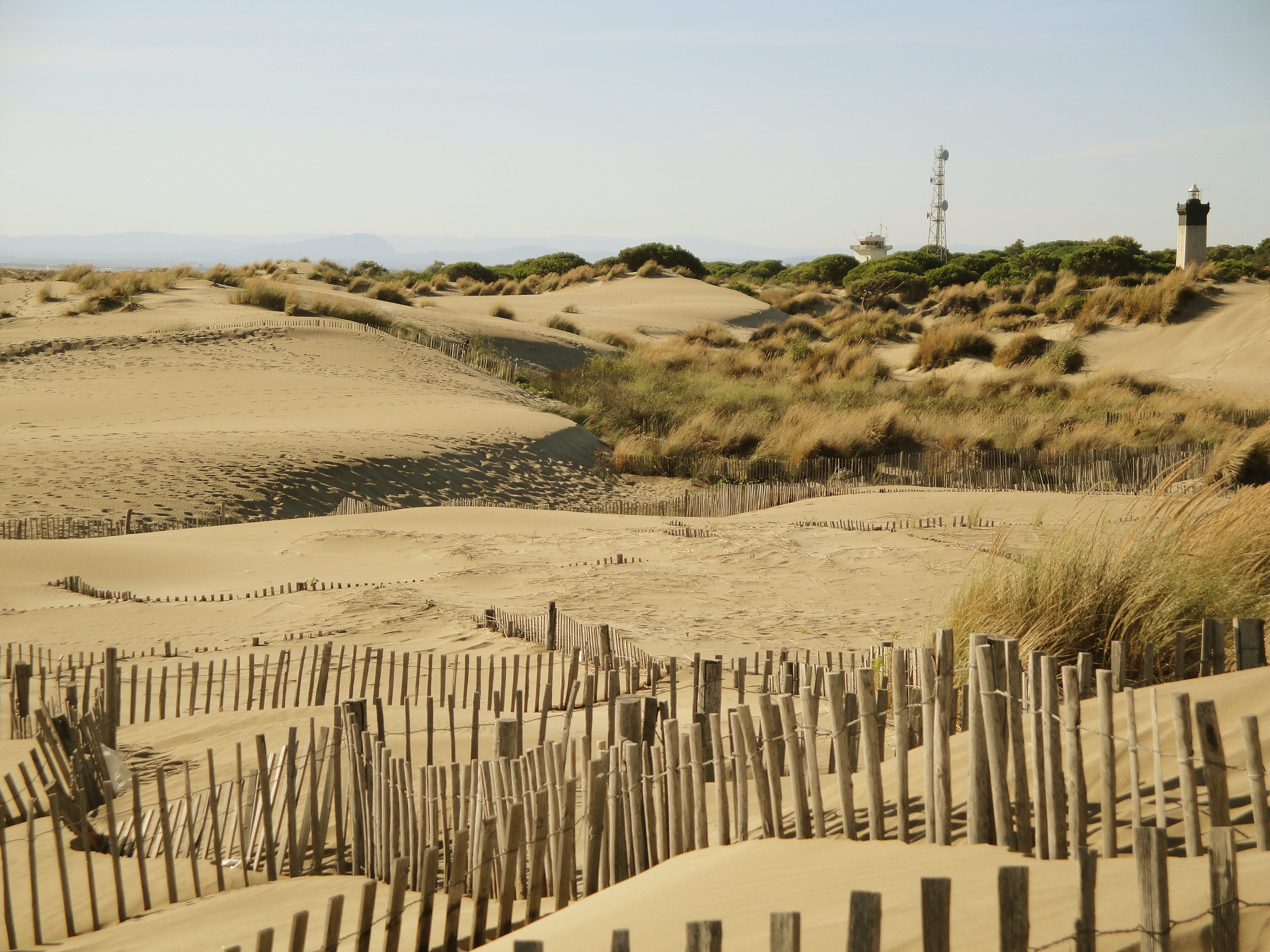
The dunes of l'Espiguette

The Pointe de l'Espiguette (Occitan: Punta de l'Espiguette) is a vast dune system located on the Mediterranean coast of the Gard department in France.

It is east of Le Grau-du-Roi and west of the Petit-Rhône, in the Petite Camargue region. The dune system is almost 18 kilometers (11 miles) long and stretches across several hectares. L'Espiguette is a preserved wild natural site, although it is fragile. The beaches at the location attract numerous tourists and swimmers each year. The Phare de l'Espiguette is located in the dune system.
