= Phare de l'Espiguette =

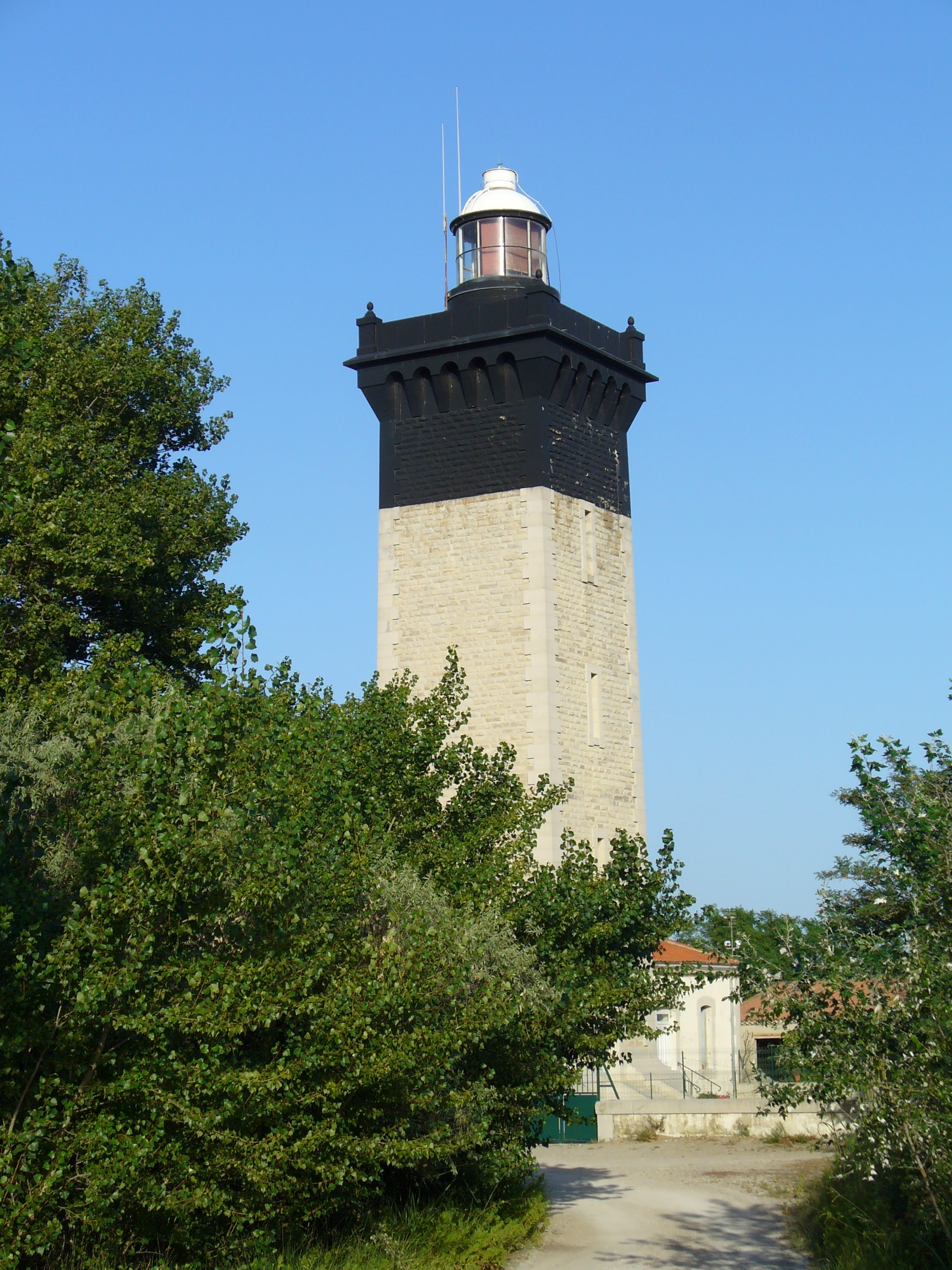
- Phare de l'Espiguette
- Location: Le Grau-du-Roi, Gard; Languedoc-Roussillon; France.
- Coordinates: 43°29′15.8″N 4°8′30.2″E

Tower
- Constructed: 1869
- Construction: masonry tower
- Automated: 1980
- Height: 27.40 metres (89.9 ft)
- Shape: square tower with balcony and lantern attached to 1-story keeper's house
- Markings: white tower with a large horizontal band in the upper part, white lantern dome
- Heritage: monument historique inscrit, classified historical monument

Light
- Focal height: 26.85 metres (88.1 ft)
- Intensity: 1000 W halogen lamp
- Range: 24 nautical miles (44 km)
- Characteristic: Fl (3) W 15s
- France no.: FR-1321

The Phare de l'Espiguette (Espiguette Lighthouse; Occitan: Far de l'Espiguette) is a 27-metre (89 ft)-high square tower. Built in 1869, the lighthouse is found on the Pointe de l'Espiguette, near to Le Grau-du-Roi on the Gulf of Lion in Occitanie, France.

== Geography ==
L'Espiguette appears on some of the oldest maps: on the Barentzoom map of 1593 it is called Lapiquete and was an island. The channels in the Rhône delta are constantly changing, it was in 1570 that the Grau de Roi opened up, and the subsequent channelling of this watercourse and the silting of the land alongside it led to the fishing village of Le Grau-du-Roi, and the silting made a land bridge through to L'Espiguette. To the south of L'Espiguette is the Mediterranean Sea and to the north the Lagune de la Sicarex, which in itself is a protected breeding ground for endangered avian species. The point consists of 197 ha of sand dunes, and is a protected nature reserve. The beaches are popular with tourists, and host a large naturist beach.

== History ==
The square tower was built in 1869, 150 metres (490 ft) from the mean high tide mark, the silting has continues and it is now situated in sand dunes more than 700 metres (2,300 ft) from the water.

== Technical details ==
A 1000W Halogen lamp throws its beam 24 nautical miles (44 km; 28 mi) south. It throws 3 white flashes four times a minute.

== See also ==
- List of lighthouses in France
- Pointe de l'Espiguette
