= Mission Racine =

French government tourism initiative

Mission Racine, officially the "Interministerial working group for the tourist coastal infrastructure of Languedoc-Roussillon" (French: Mission interministérielle d'aménagement touristique du littoral du Languedoc-Roussillon, abbreviation MIALR; was a government initiative aiming to boost tourism on the coast of the French region of Languedoc-Roussillon. The team was composed exclusively of civil servants; the working group was initiated in 1963 and is named after its president, Pierre Racine. The State, through the mission, under Prime Minister Georges Pompidou, was responsible for managing the road, maritime and air infrastructure. Urban planning is the responsibility of the municipalities concerned (between Marseille and Perpignan) for popular tourism.

== Development ==
The working group was founded on June 18, 1963 and, as a centrally government-controlled initiative, represents the intermediate step from private tourism infrastructure planning to the "Schéma de cohérence territoriale" (SCoT), which has been established in France since the 1980s.

The planning affected both established locations that had been developed for tourism since the 19th century (Palavas-les-Flots and Valras-Plage) as well as new urban plans that had been created (particular mass-plans in Port-Camargue (architect Jean Balladur), La Grande-Motte (architect Jean Balladur), Cap d'Agde (architect Jean Le Couteur), Carnon (architect ), Gruissan (architects Raymond Gleize Edouard Hartané), Port-Leucate (architect Georges Candilis), Port-Barcarès (architect Georges Candilis), Saint-Pierre-la-Mer (architects Henri Castella & Pierre Lafitte), Saint-Cyprien (architect Eugène Beaudoin ), Balaruc-les-Bains (architect André Gomis .

The quantitative goal of Mission Racine was to expand bed capacity in the region from 250,000 beds (1964) to 650,000 beds (1980). Since the 2000s, attempts have been made to convert around 195,000 little-used second homes into permanent dwellings, although there are climatic problems concerning (in France) all the houses that will be below sea level.

== Architecture ==
The Mission Racine is formerly structured around Georges Candilis and some other architects. Various architectures are set up from

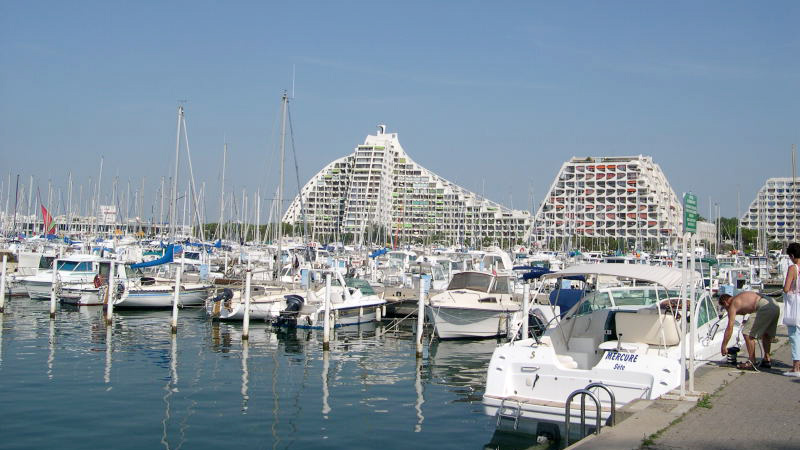
La Grande Motte

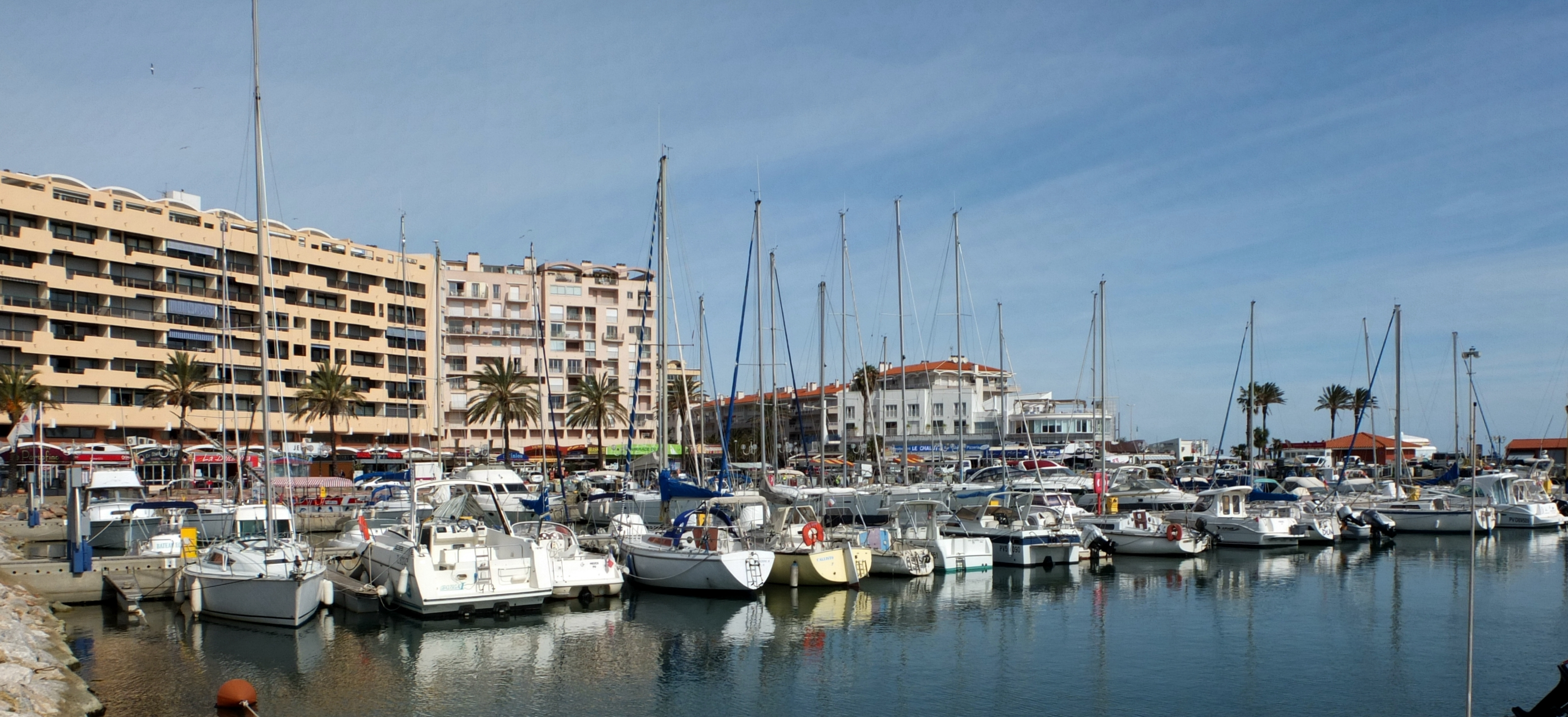
Saint-Cyprien

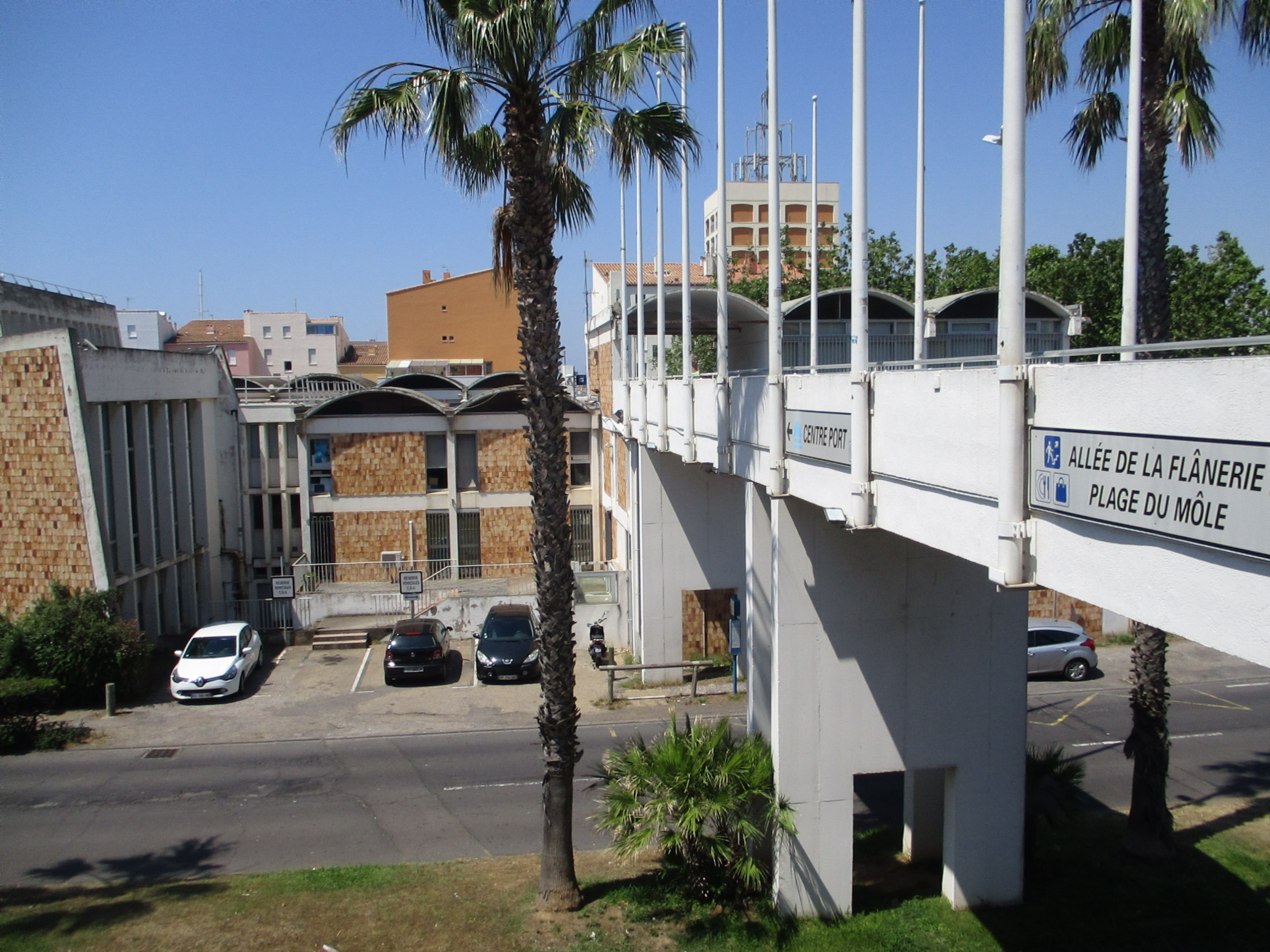
Cap d'Agde

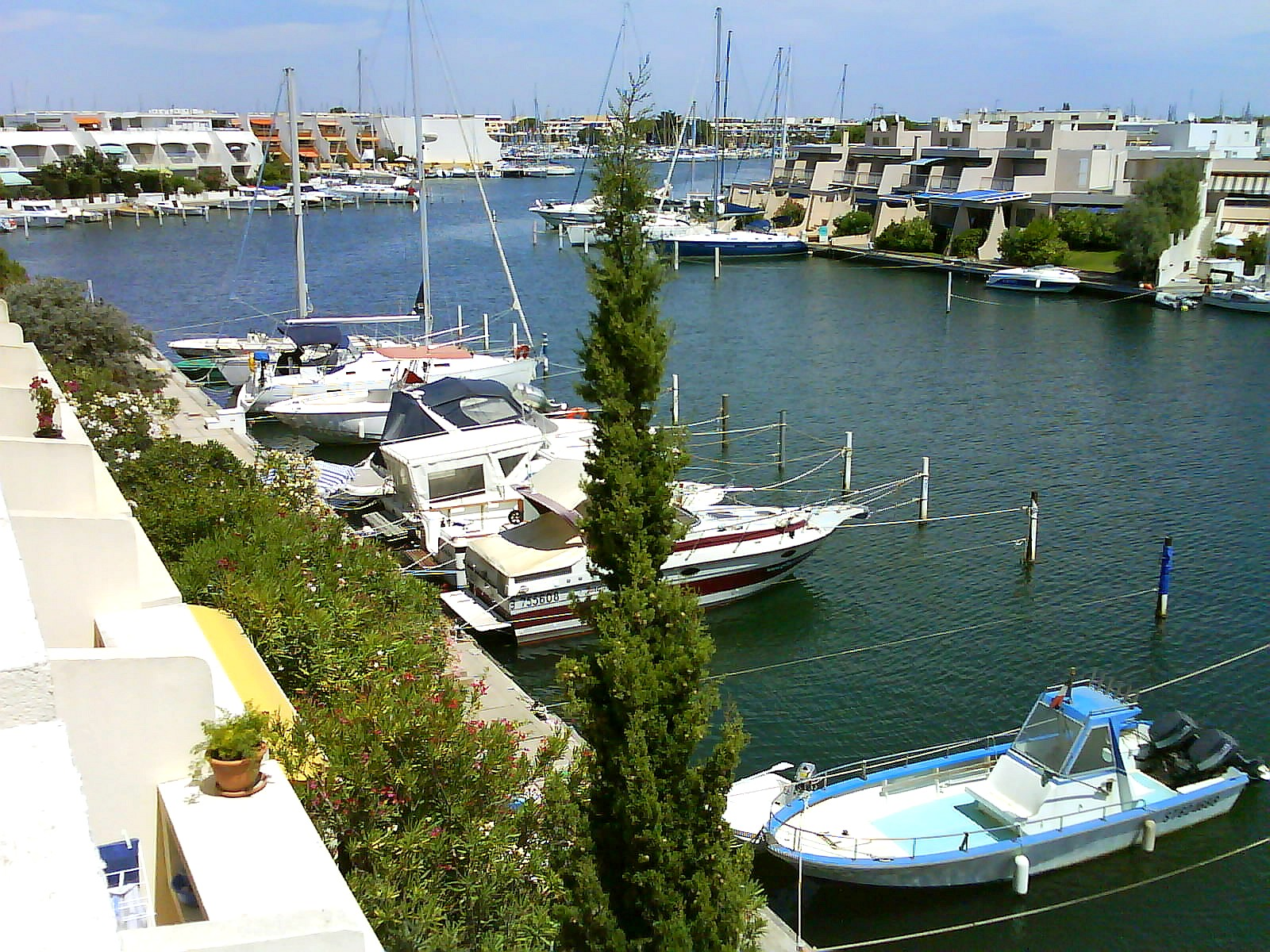
Port-Camargue

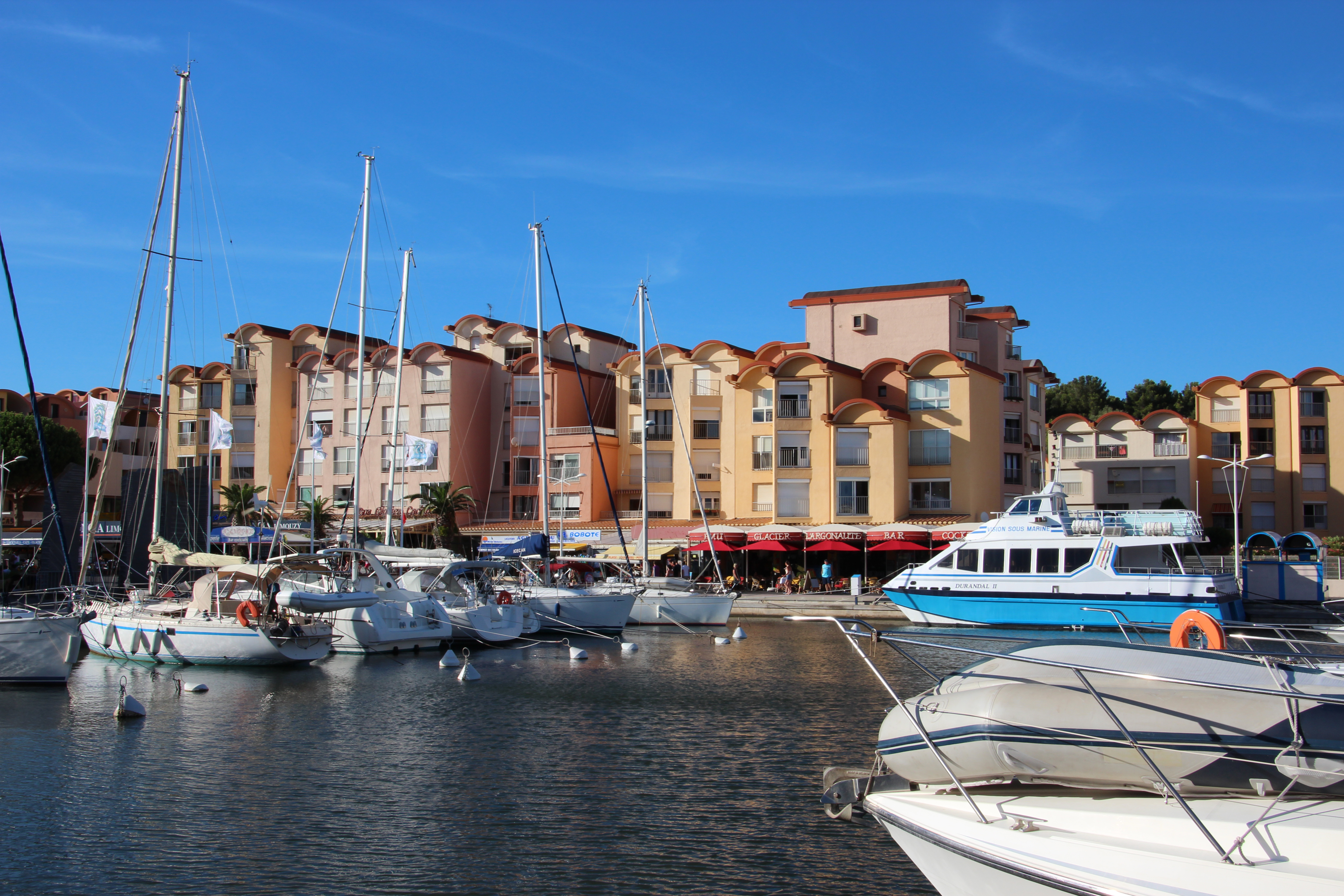
Gruissan

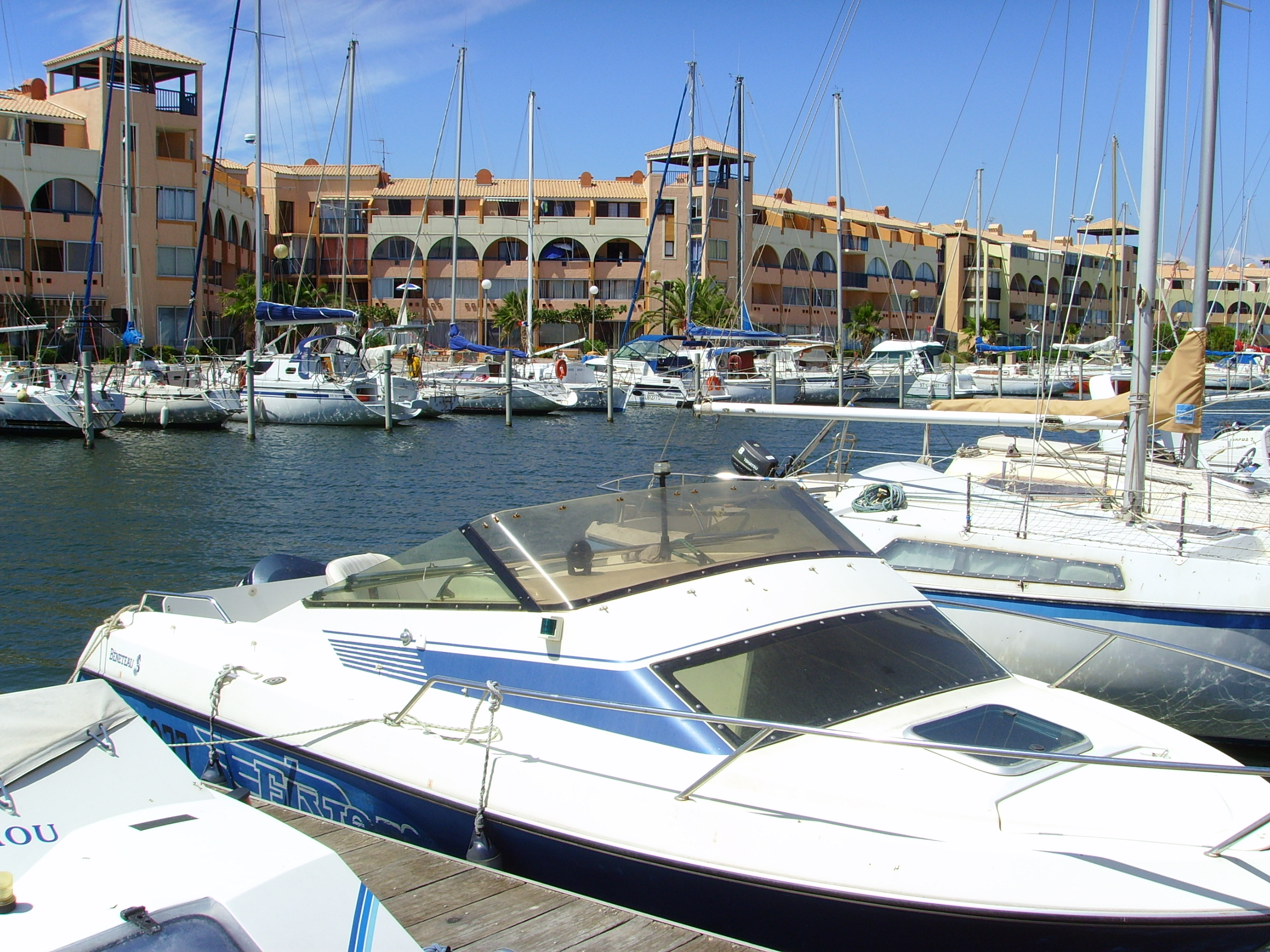
Port Leucate

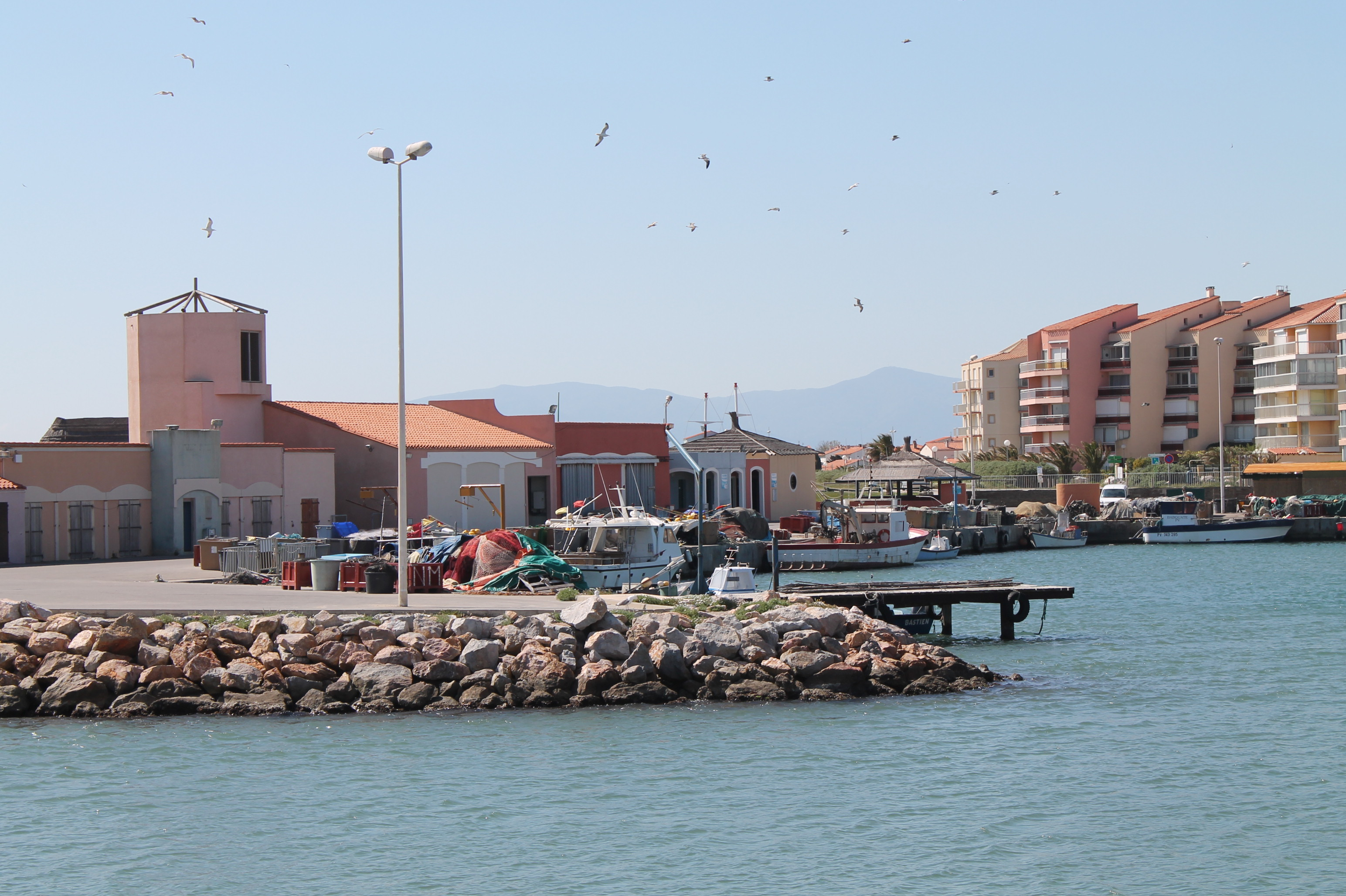
Port-Barcarès

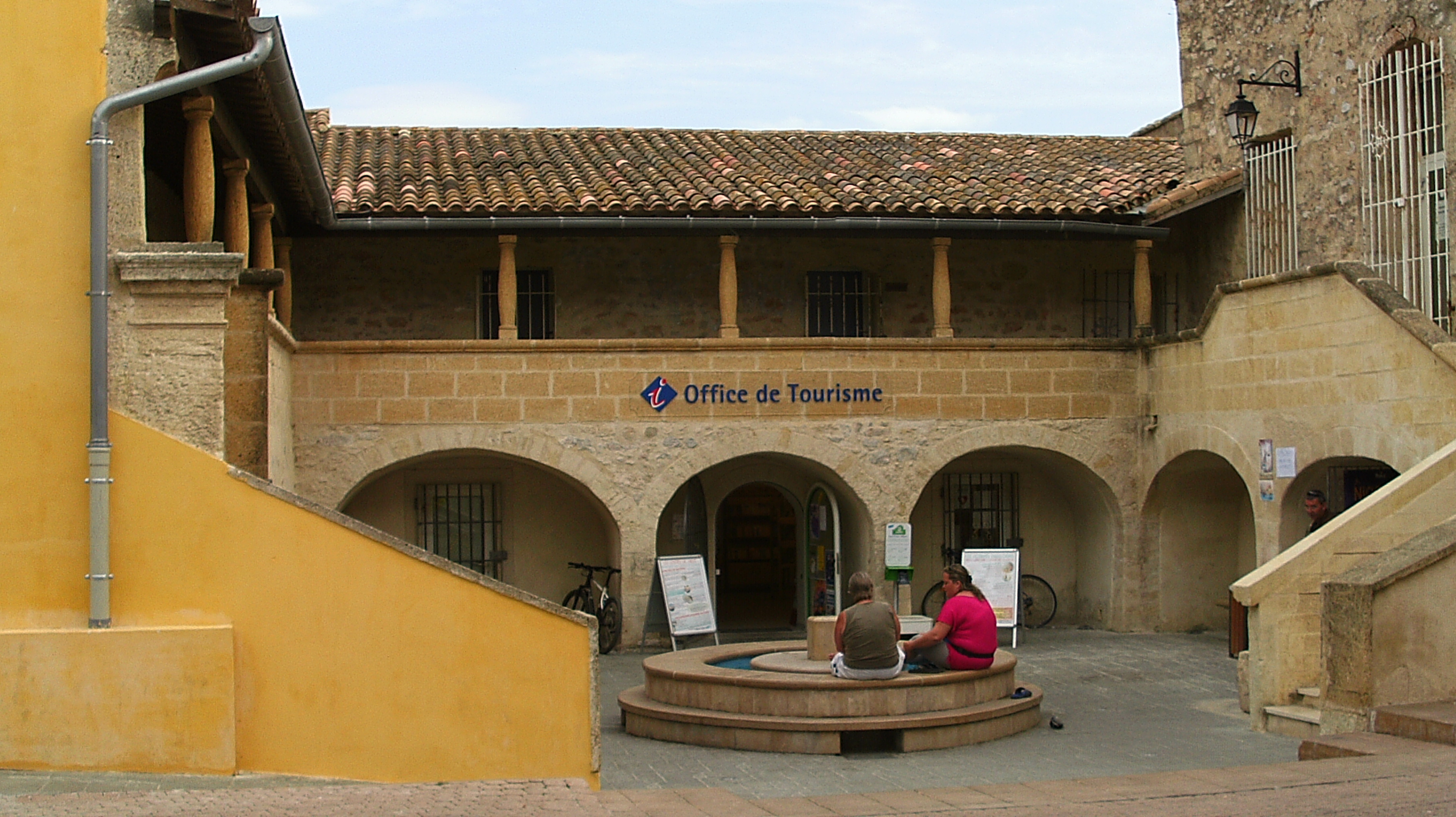
Balaruc-les-bains

== Foundational elements ==
(Notice : At the same time, seaside resorts ("front de mer", seafront) and mountain resorts ("front de neige", snowfront) for leisure and regional economics were built up in the French government Action plan.)

Pierre Racine :
"Why, you may ask, did the government launch this vast project to develop the Languedoc-Roussillon coastline last year? Because, paradoxically, at a time when millions of tourists are flocking to our Mediterranean coasts, 180 kilometers of coastline remain virtually untouched, despite already considerable efforts. For the first time, a regional urban development plan was drawn up by architects, monitored by technicians and approved by the government.
There are three reasons why the state took charge of this vast undertaking, the first of its scale.

- Firstly, the need for a comprehensive plan: for the first time, a regional urban development plan was drawn up by architects, monitored by technicians and approved by the government.
- Secondly, the scale of the facilities required justified the involvement of the State, local authorities and all private resources.

Firstly, the State is directly responsible for the basic infrastructure: roads, harbors, sanitation, drinking water supply, mosquito control, etc. The local authorities that we wish to involve politically in this work, i.e. essentially the départements and the communes concerned, will be responsible for rehabilitating the land and the stations that the State will develop.
The private sector will play a decisive role in this development, building hotels, villas, houses and vacation camps; the specialized financial and real-estate groups, but also all social groups, youth clubs, tourism groups, etc., and lastly, private individuals wishing to acquire land to build their own villa;

- There is a third reason why the State has intervened: despite the considerable expansion of leisure tourism, it is not accessible to everyone today.

The Languedoc-Roussillon coast is the perfect opportunity to create the first tourism business for all. Not only in our resorts, our architects will tell you all about it. There will be developments of all kinds, but we intend to sell the land to social groups at a differential social price, i.e., at a lower price. To carry out this vast undertaking, the administration itself has had to adapt, as it is too compartmentalized to successfully complete a work requiring synthesis from conception and coordination to execution at all times.
An interministerial mission was set up under the regional planning delegation, comprising the five ministries primarily concerned, the tourism commissioner, the Prefect of the Montpellier region and his general secretary, and Mr Pierre Raynaud [the future Conservatoire du littoral president], and the government delegation, to draw up the plan and have it implemented by all the Parisian and provincial administrations working on behalf of their commune.
The interministerial mission is a conductor to whom the government has given a mandate to act and succeed, and this is what she intends to do."

in
"Pierre racine interview". Institut national de l'audiovisuel (document) (in French). 2 August 1964. "translated text of the interactive text in the INA document"

== Bibliography ==
- Giacomo, Parrinello; Bécot, Renaud (2019). "Regional Planning and the Environmental Impact of Coastal Tourism: The Mission Racine for the Redevelopment of Languedoc-Roussillon's Littoral". Humanities. Humanities V.8 n°1. 8: 13. doi:10.3390/h8010013.
- Hatt, Emeline (2020). Aménagement touristique des littoraux et planification en France. Des schémas d'aménagement étatiques aux schémas de cohérence territoriale. Géographie, économie, société 2020/1 (Vol. 22) (in French). Vol. 22. pp. 81–104.
- Boisson, Pierre (1967). La démoustication du littoral méditerranéen (in French). Montpellier: Entente interdépartementale pour la démoustication du littoral méditerranéen. p. 94.
- Racine, Pierre (1980). Mission impossible ? L'aménagement touristique du littoral Languedoc-Roussillon. Montpellier: Midi Libre - collection témoignages. p. 293.
- François, Michèle (2010). Jean Balladur et la Grande-Motte; L'architecture d'une ville (in French). Montpellier: Direction régionale des affaires culturelles du Languedoc-Roussillon. p. 63. ISBN 978-2-11-099544-5..
- Marez Lopez, Izol Emilia (18 January 2021). Tourist towns in Languedoc-Roussillon (PDF).
- Lochard, Thierry (2016). Les stations balnéaires du Languedoc-Roussillon. "— l'unité touristique du Grau-du-Roi – Palavas-les-Flots, près de Montpellier, qui comprend la marina de Port-Camargue et la station de la Grande Motte avec Jean Balladur comme architecte en chef, prévues à l'origine pour 12 000 et 43 000 lits ; — l'unité touristique du Bassin de Thau, avec le Cap d'Agde, par Jean-Le Couteur (52 000 lits) ; — l'unité touristique de l'Embouchure de l'Aude et de Valras, par Henri Castella et Pierre Lafitte (50 000 lits), non réalisée ; — l'unité touristique de Gruissan, par Raymond Gleize et Édouard Hartané (42 000 lits) ; — l'unité touristique de Port-Leucate et de Port-Barcarès, par Georges Candilis (40 000 et 42 000 lits) ; — et le développement du secteur de Canet, Saint-Cyprien et Argelès, par Eugène Beaudouin et Joachim Génard (24 000 lits). Enfin, dans le département de l'Hérault, la création plus modeste de Carnon-Plage (par René Gagès, 7 000 lits) et l'aménagement de la station thermale de Balaruc-les-Bains (par André Gomis) complètent le dispositif."
- Brun, Alexandre (2021). Mission Racine 50 ans après [Mission Racine 50 years ago] (Technical report) (in French). Université Paul Valéry Montpellier 3 – via YouTube.

plus

- Atelier d'architecture et d'urbanisme Le Couteur, Cap d'Agde, Edition Score, Paris, sd,(in French).
- Jacques Pelletier, La Mission interministérielle pour l'aménagement du littoral du Languedoc-Roussillon. Exemple d'administration de mission, École nationale d'administration, Paris, 1963, (in French).
- Françoise Tournier, L'aménagement du littoral Languedoc-Roussillon : bilan et perspectives, mémoire présenté sous la direction du professeur Henry Roussillon, Institut d'études politiques, Toulouse, 1986, (in French).
- Stéphane Corneille, Les suites de la Mission Racine à travers l'étude comparée du Cap d'Agde et de la Grande-Motte, sous la direction de Guy Burgel et Frédéric Dufaux, Maîtrise URBAM, Paris-Nanterre, 1993–1994, 123 p., (in French).
