= Lacoste, Vaucluse =

Lacoste
- Commune
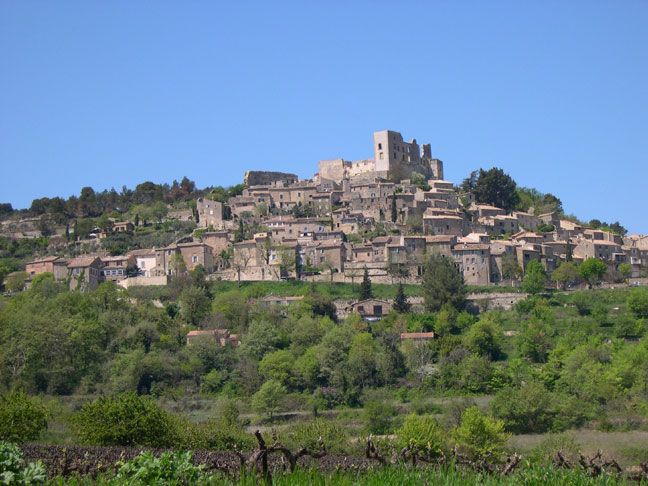
- View of Lacoste

- Coat of arms
- Location of Lacoste
- Location within France Location within Provence-Alpes-Côte d'Azur
- Coordinates: 43°49′59″N 5°16′27″E
- Country: France
- Region: Provence-Alpes-Côte d'Azur
- Department: Vaucluse
- Arrondissement: Apt
- Canton: Apt

Government
  - Mayor (2020–2026): Mathias Hauptmann
- Area^{1}: 10.66 km^{2} (4.12 sq mi)
- Elevation: 320 m (1,050 ft)
- Highest elevation: 716 m (2,349 ft)
- Lowest elevation: 153 m (502 ft)
- Population (2023): 468
  - Density: 43.9/km^{2} (114/sq mi)
- Time zone: UTC+01:00 (CET)
  - Summer (DST): UTC+02:00 (CEST)
- INSEE/Postal code: 84058 /84480
- ^{1} French Land Register data, which excludes lakes, ponds, glaciers > 1 km^{2} (0.386 sq mi or 247 acres) and river estuaries.

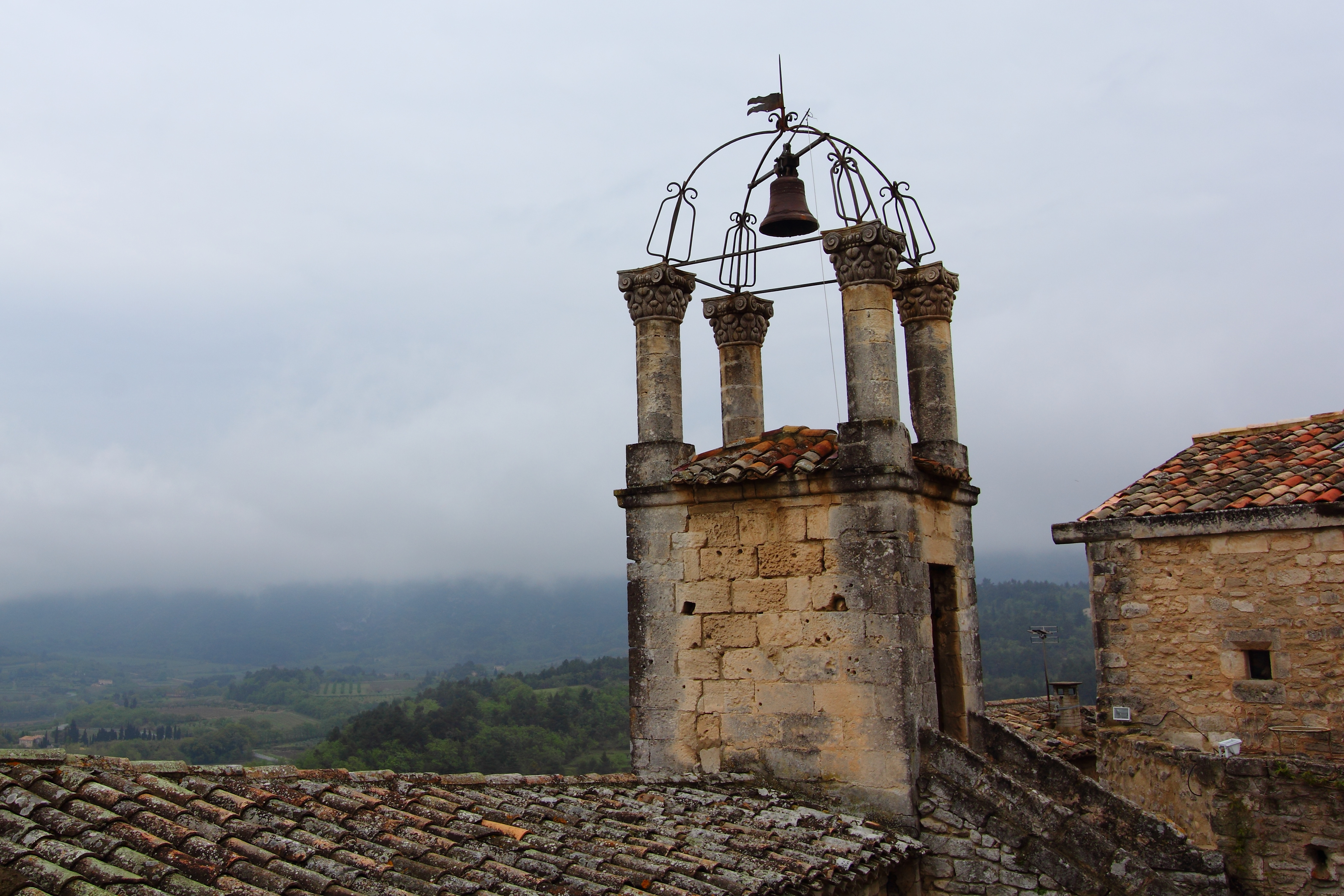
The belfry of Lacoste with campanile

Lacoste (French pronunciation: [lakɔst]; Occitan: La Còsta) is a commune in the Vaucluse department in the Provence-Alpes-Côte d'Azur region in southeastern France.

Its population doubles in size during the height of the summer tourist season.

== Geography ==
Lacoste is a picturesque old mountain village overlooking the village of Bonnieux and the Grand Luberon Mountains to the east, and flanked by the Vaucluse to the north and the Petit Luberon to the south. There is also a path through the valley that leads from Bonnieux to Lacoste (about a 45-minute walk).

== Sights ==
The vernacular architecture and cobblestone streets give the impression of a village where time has stood still. The oldest building in the town, the Maison Forte, dates back to the 9th century while the nearby Pont Julien remains one of the oldest standing examples of a working 1st-century BC Roman bridge. Finnbar Mac Eoin, author of Two Suitcases and a Dog, lives in Lacoste. He was the last person to drive across the Pont Julien before it closed to traffic in 2005. A plaque states, "We do not know who was the first person to cross, but an Irishman was the last".

== History ==
Lacoste is best known for its most notorious resident, Donatien Alphonse François, comte de Sade (the Marquis de Sade), who in the 18th century lived in the castle, Château de Lacoste, overlooking the village. Following a series of incidents involving local women and the police, the Marquis fled the country but was eventually imprisoned. His castle was partially destroyed in an uprising in 1779 and was later looted and plundered by locals. It was later bought by fashion designer Pierre Cardin, who partially restored it and held cultural events there.

During the first half of the 19th century the village saw a brief time of agricultural and economic prosperity from the Roman limestone quarries, but soon hit a slump in the second half of the century and a large portion of the upper village of Lacoste fell into disrepair and ruins.

During World War II, the French Resistance took their foothold in the steep Luberon Mountains around Lacoste, and trenches and barbed wire still exist in the forested area in the valley, where resistance fighters prepared to square off with German troops.

== Culture ==
Tony Perrottet of Slate said that Lacoste "always had a contrarian streak," citing the fact that Lacoste was a Protestant village surrounded by Catholic communities and that a communist mayor had been in power for fifty years. There are two small cafés in town where locals and students go to socialize.

== Arts ==
The Marquis fancied Lacoste as a destination for thespians, which has in some small part become true. In the 1990s, the ruins of the castle, along with an attached quarry, were bought by fashion designer Pierre Cardin, and since 1994 musical and theatrical works have been performed there. Cardin founded L'Espace Cardin in the village of Lacoste as his business and ticketing office, and renovated the quarry into a massive outdoor performance area and stage. Annually, Cardin's festival draws thousands during the month of July for world-class opera, theater, and music set in the quarried stage and coinciding with the Festival d'Avignon, the renowned summer theater and performance festival in the nearby city of Avignon.

Adding to the town's reputation as an artistic haven, The Lacoste School of the Arts was founded in Lacoste in 1970 by American art professor and painter, Bernard Pfriem. Under Pfriem's direction, notable artists came to Lacoste to teach and be inspired by the peace and tranquility of the rural environment, including Benny Andrews, Denis Brihat, Henri Cartier-Bresson, David Douglas Duncan, Nene Humphrey, Gjon Mili, and Jean-Pierre Sudre, and Maggie Siner among others. The expatriate American poet, Gustaf Sobin, often taught poetry to students at The Lacoste School of the Arts. Through Pfriem and Sobin's leadership, the school emerged to become one of the most respected art programs in France.

Sarah Lawrence College, the Cleveland Institute of Art, and Bard College traded partnership with the school before the Savannah College of Art and Design took control in 2002. Today the Savannah College of Art and Design hosts four quarters of classes for art students and professors from all corners of the globe, studying fine arts, writing, architecture, design, fashion, film, photography, sculpture, and theater, to name a few of the subjects. The 30+year history of the Lacoste School of the Arts has helped to infuse a multicultural and worldly artistic sense to the village. The Savannah College of Art and Design recently renovated Maison Basse at the base of the hill village, expanding the number of students who can study in Lacoste each quarter.

== Gallery ==
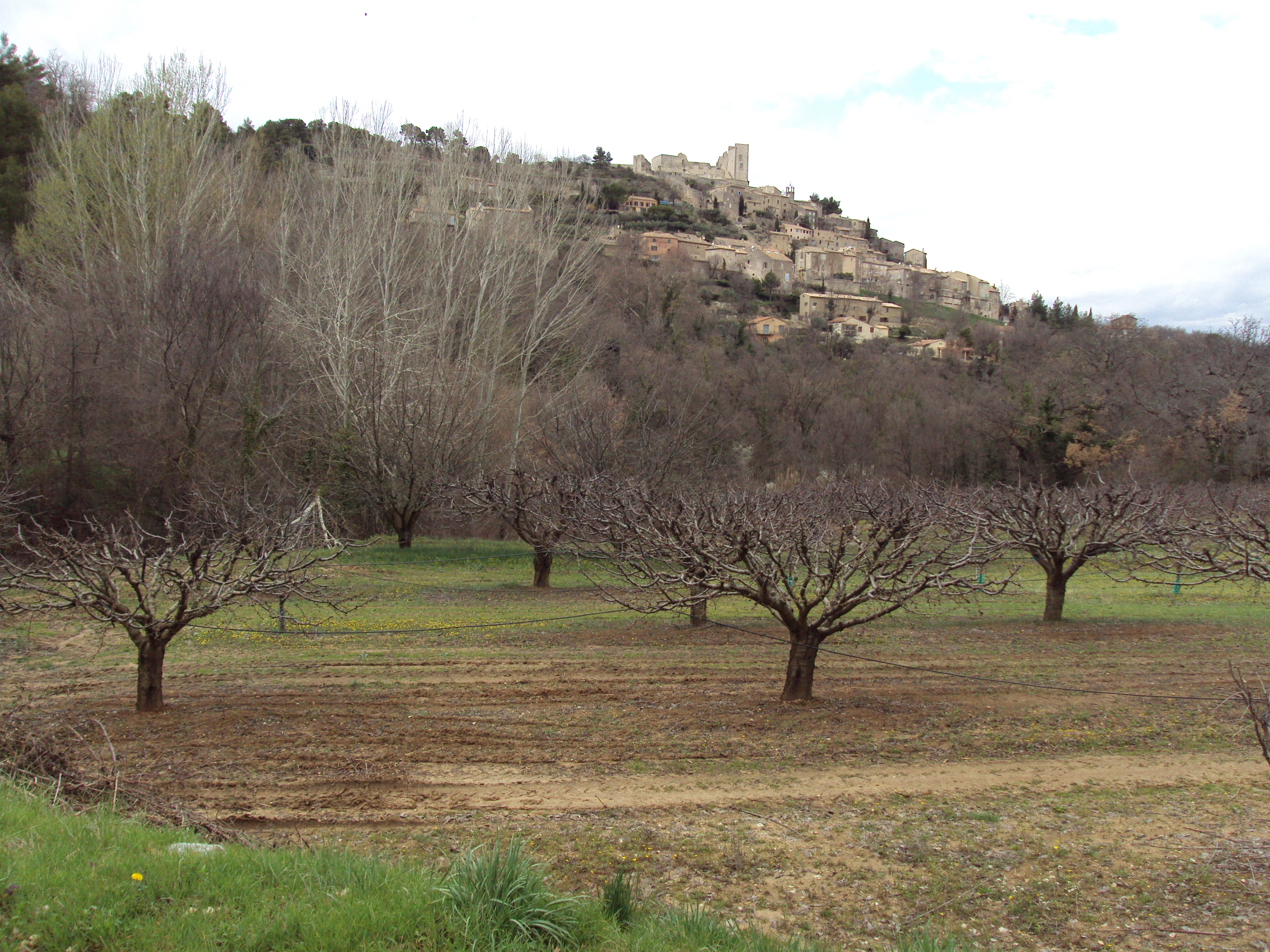
View of Lacoste, Vaucluse in March

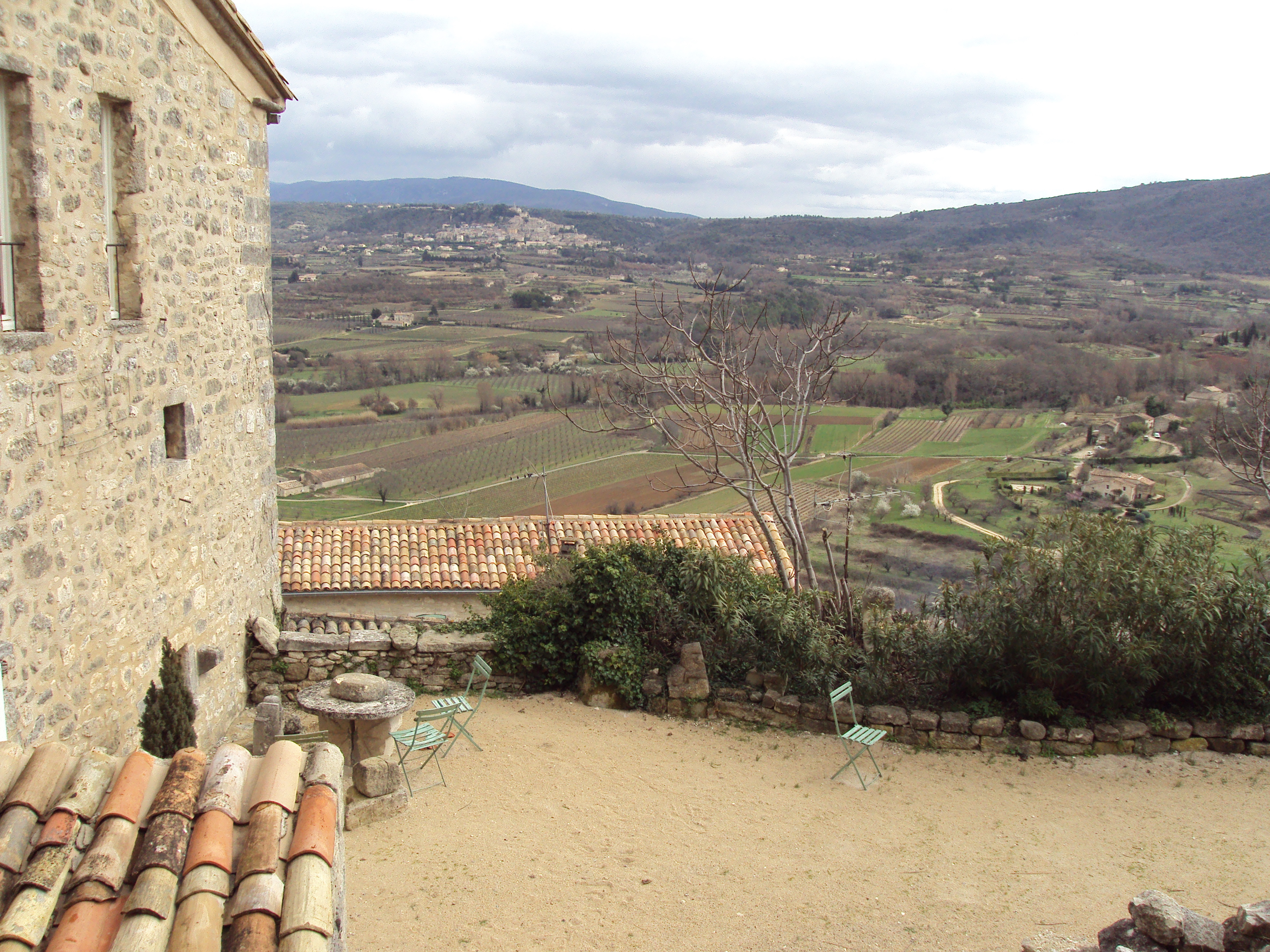
View of the valley from Lacoste, Vaucluse

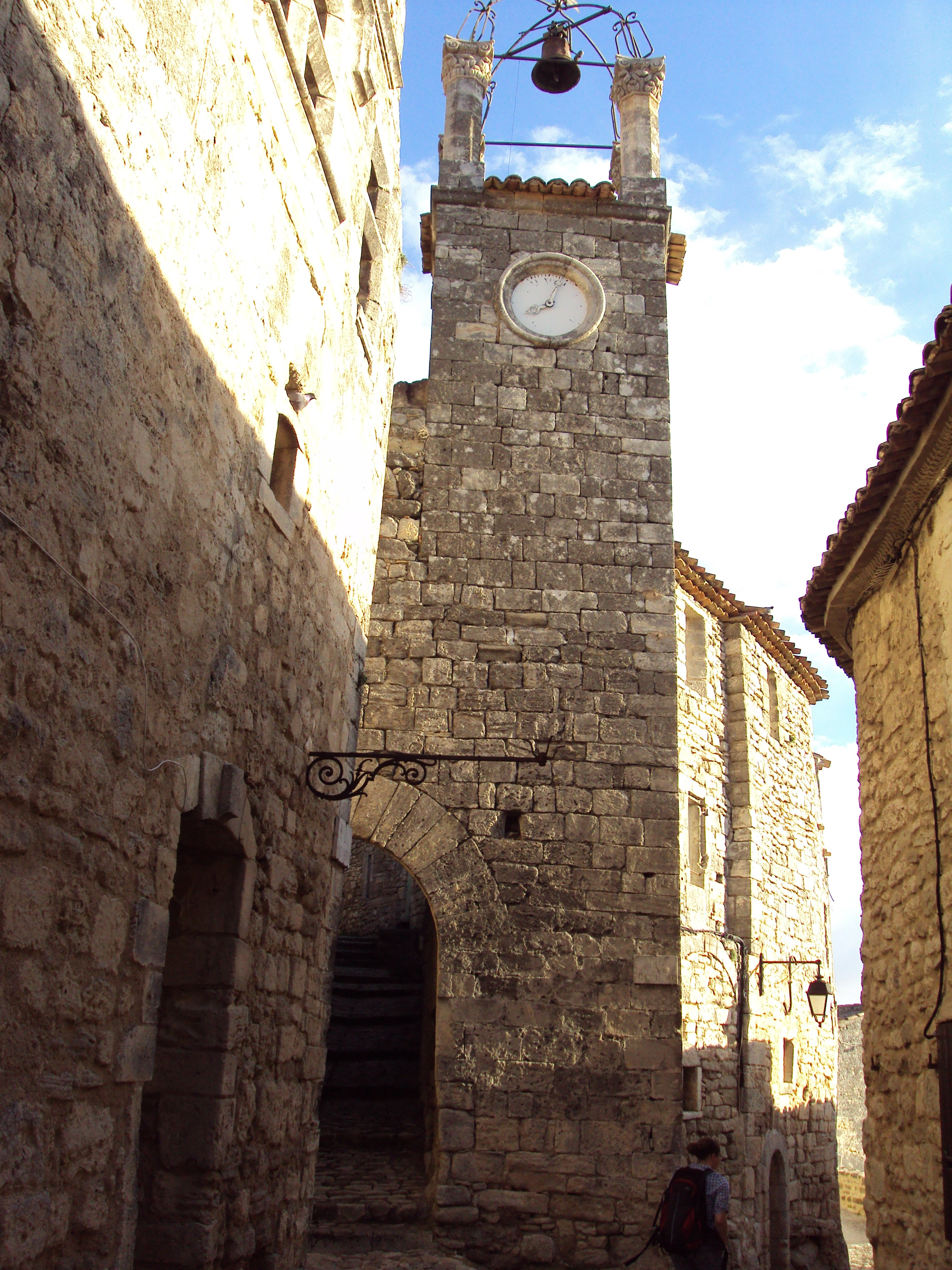
Clock tower in Lacoste, Vaucluse in France

== See also ==
- Château de Lacoste
- Côtes du Luberon AOC
- Communes of the Vaucluse department
