= Château de Lacoste =

Ruined castle in Vaucluse, France

Coordinates: 43°49′57″N 5°16′19″E

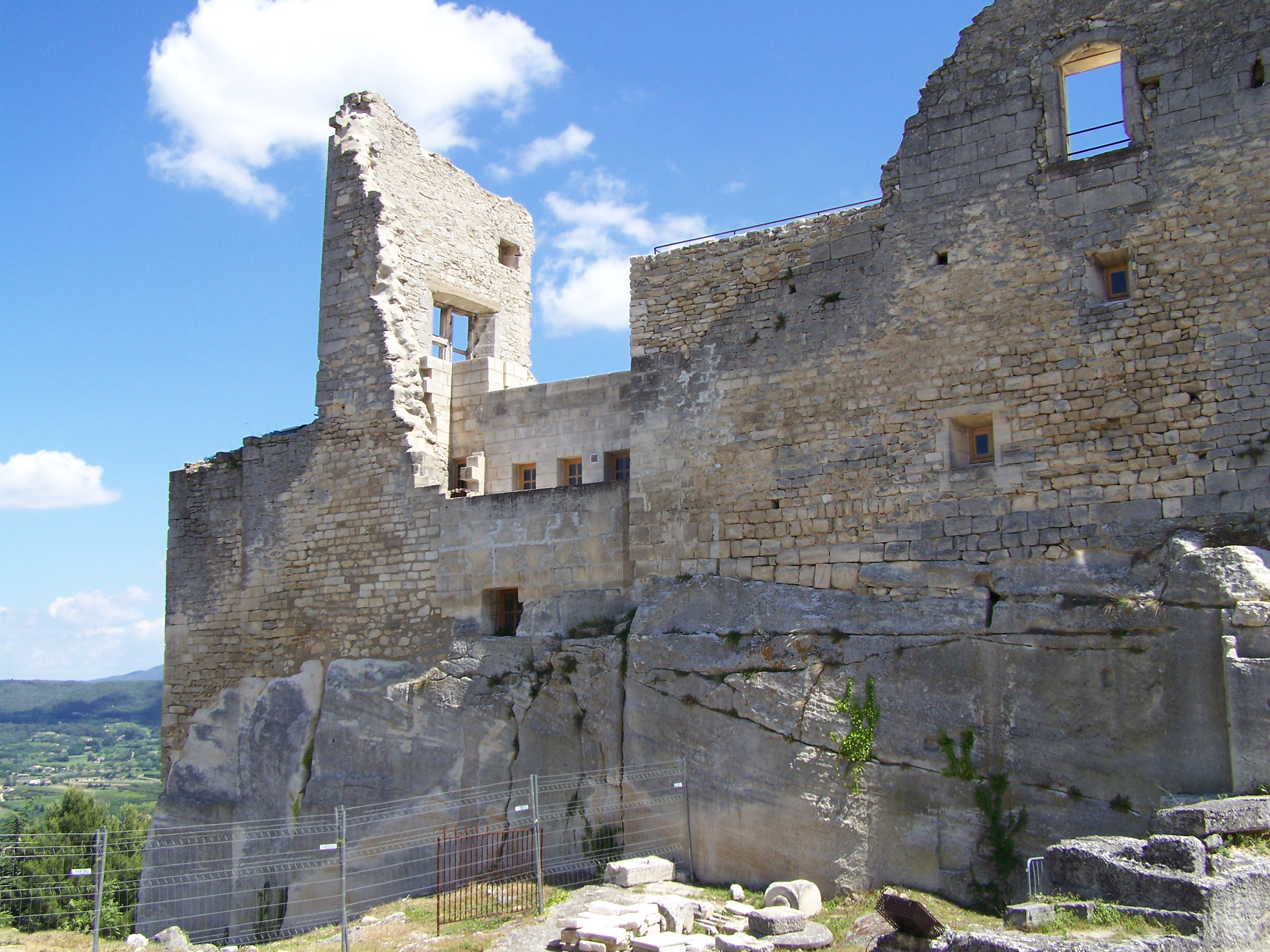
Ruins of the Château de Lacoste, one of three residences of the Marquis de Sade in Vaucluse

The Château de Lacoste or La Coste is a ruined castle in the commune of Lacoste in the Vaucluse department in southern France.

== Location ==
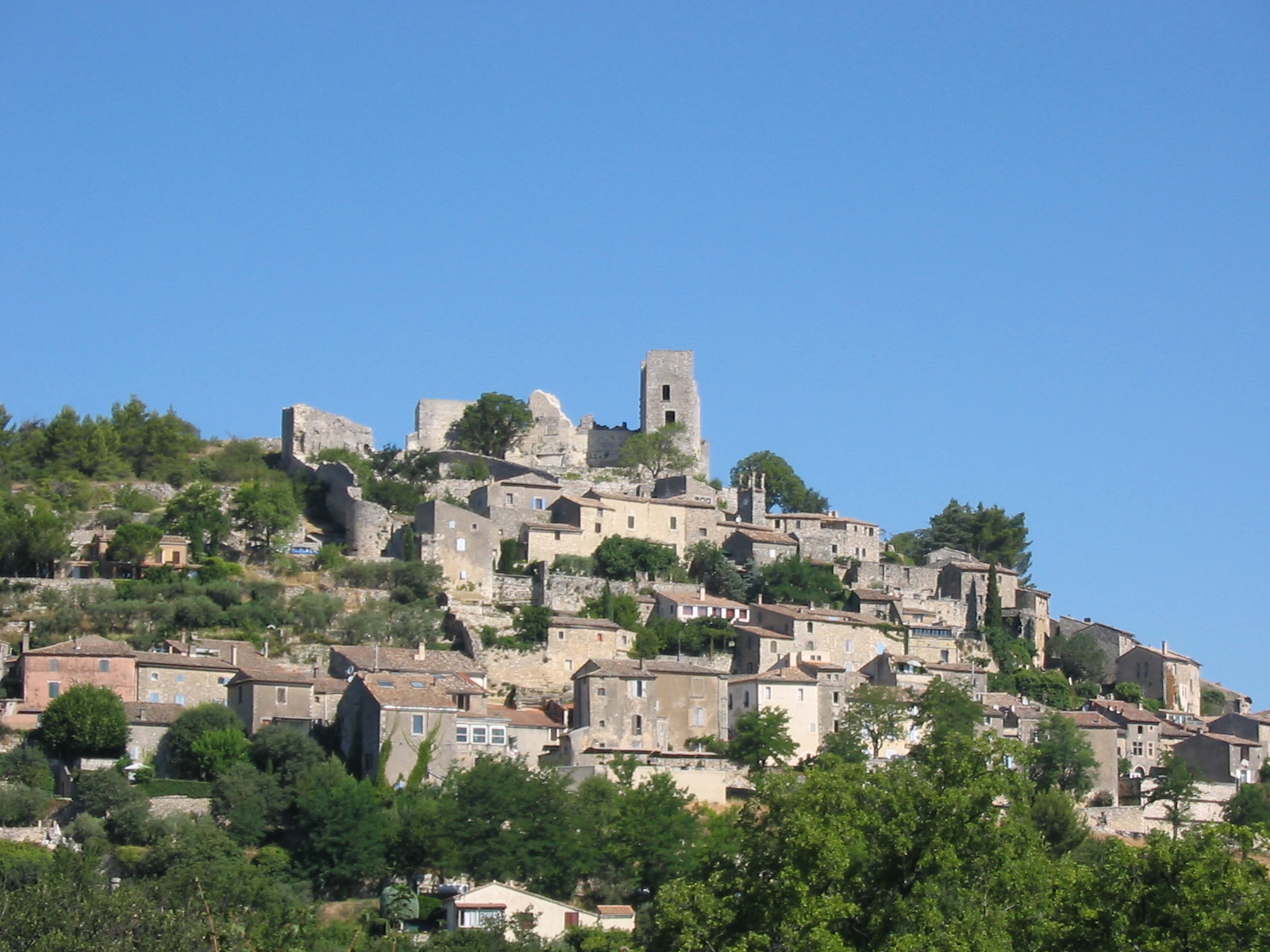
At the top of the village, the ruins of the Marquis de Sade's castle, pillaged during the Revolution.

The castle is sited on an extension of the northern flank of the Little Luberon on which the village stands. This position offers its occupants superb views over the valley of the Calavon, the Monts de Vaucluse, Mont Ventoux and the Alps, as well as the village of Bonnieux which can be seen on a neighbouring hill.

== History ==
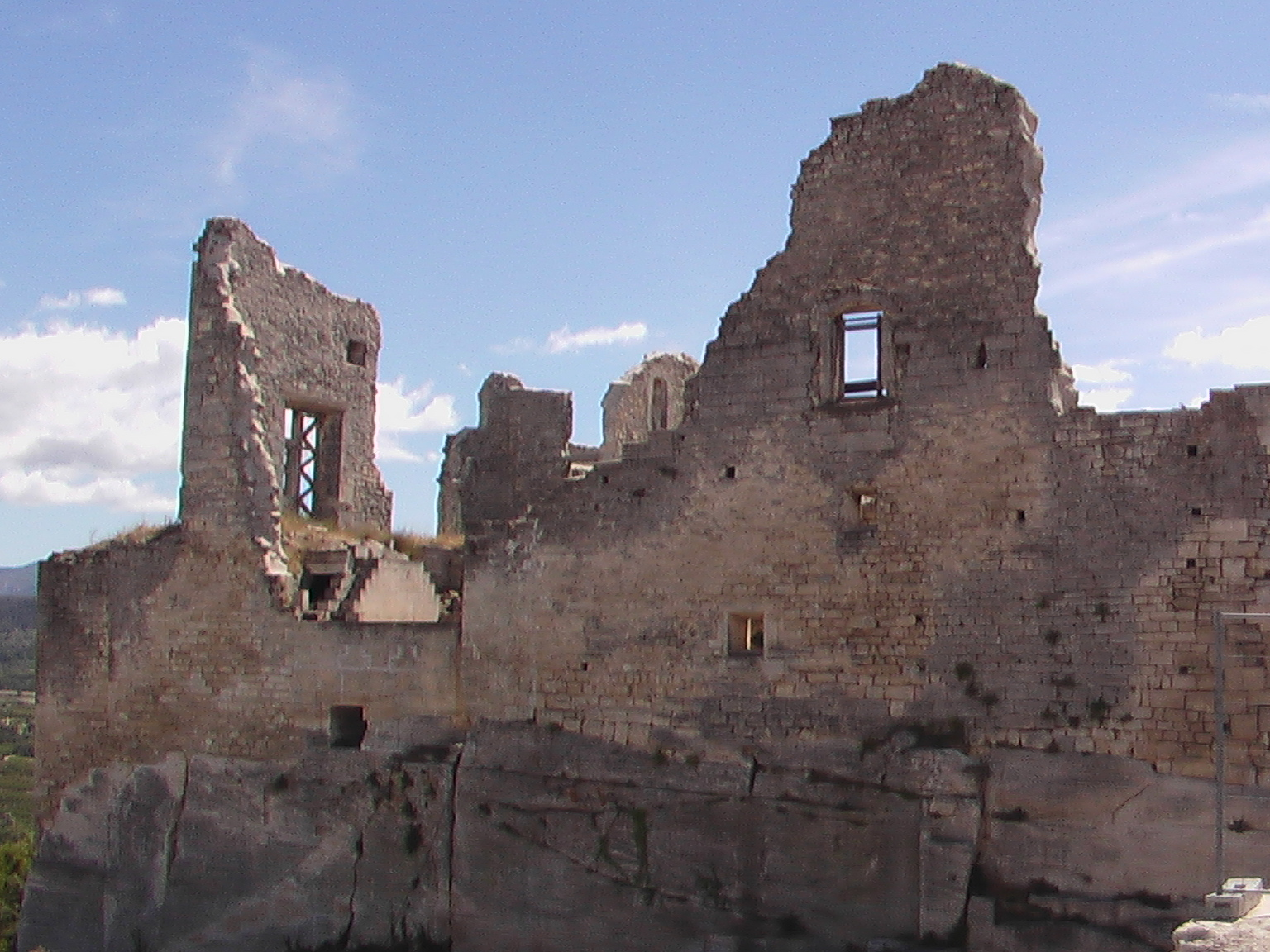
Château de Lacoste

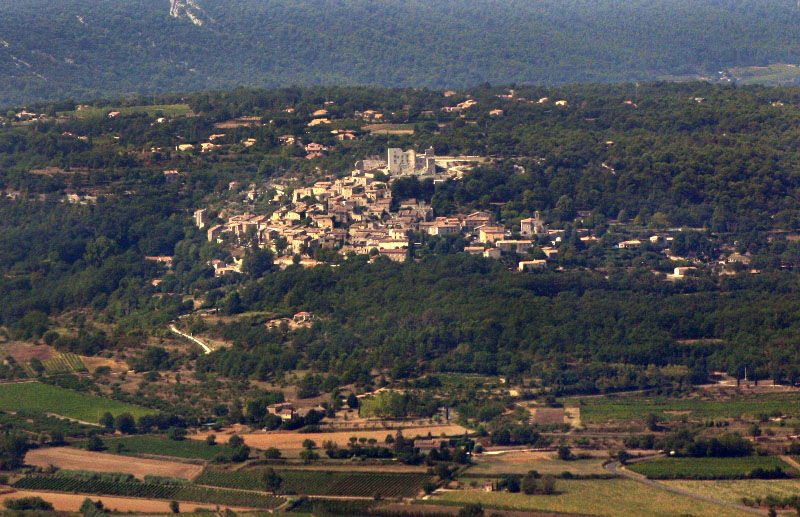
Aerial view of the castle and Lacoste village

The castle's origins are in the 11th century, but it was largely modified in subsequent centuries.

It was for many years the property of the Simiane family.

Two hypotheses are suggested for the transfer of the castle from the Simianes to the Sades.

- In 1627, Diane Simiane married Jean-Baptiste de Sade, ancestor of the Marquis de Sade, who thus became owner of the estate.
- In 1716, Isabelle Simiane bequeathed the castle to her cousin Gaspard François de Sade, Lord of Saumane and Mazan. This latter hypothesis is the more probable.

The Marquis de Sade stayed there from 1769 to 1772, between the scandals at Arcueil and Marseille, then after the latter and his flight to Italy, he took refuge there until his incarceration in the Château de Vincennes in 1777. Escaping while being transferred to Aix, he took refuge there for the last time from 16 July to 7 September 1778 before being returned to Vincennes.

It was in 1772 that he made his longest stay there, during which he built in the castle a theatre capable of holding 120 spectators. Throughout his internments, he maintained an extraordinary attachment (un attachement extraordinaire) for La Coste.

During the French Revolution, the castle was vandalised and largely destroyed. The construction materials were sold.

Crippled with debts, in year IV of the Republic (1796) the castle and its estate were sold to Rovère, deputy of Vaucluse and a native of Bonnieux, who, a victim of the Coup of 18 Fructidor, was deported to French Guiana where he died at Sinnamary in 1798.

In 1952, André Bouer, college teacher, became the owner and dedicated himself to the castle's restoration.

In 2001, Pierre Cardin bought the castle. His second residence, the castle is being renovated. Each year, prior to his death, he organised a musical artistic festival in the quarries to the west of the castle.

== The castle in art ==
De Sade described his castle in two of his works – La Marquise de Ganges and Les cent vingt journées de Sodome (The 120 Days of Sodom) – under the name of the Château de Silling.

The castle is used as a backdrop in the comic Dick Herisson, by Didier Savard. In the album Le Vampier the castle is the centre of a proto-Nazi plan to purify the Aryan race. At the end, the villain is smashed to death against the walls of the building as he tries to escape an angry mob.

== Ancient monument ==
The castle has been listed since 1992 as a monument historique by the French Ministry of Culture. Protection covers the castle itself, the courtyards and the dry moats.

== See also ==
- List of castles in France

== Bibliography ==
- Jules Courtet, Dictionnaire géographique, géologique, historique, archéologique et biographique du département du Vaucluse, Avignon, 1876
- Robert Bailly, Dictionnaire des communes du Vaucluse, Éd. A. Barthélemy, Avignon, 1986
- Henri Fauville, La Coste – Sade en Provence, Édisud, Aix-en-Provence, 1984
