= Saint-Thibéry =

- Commune
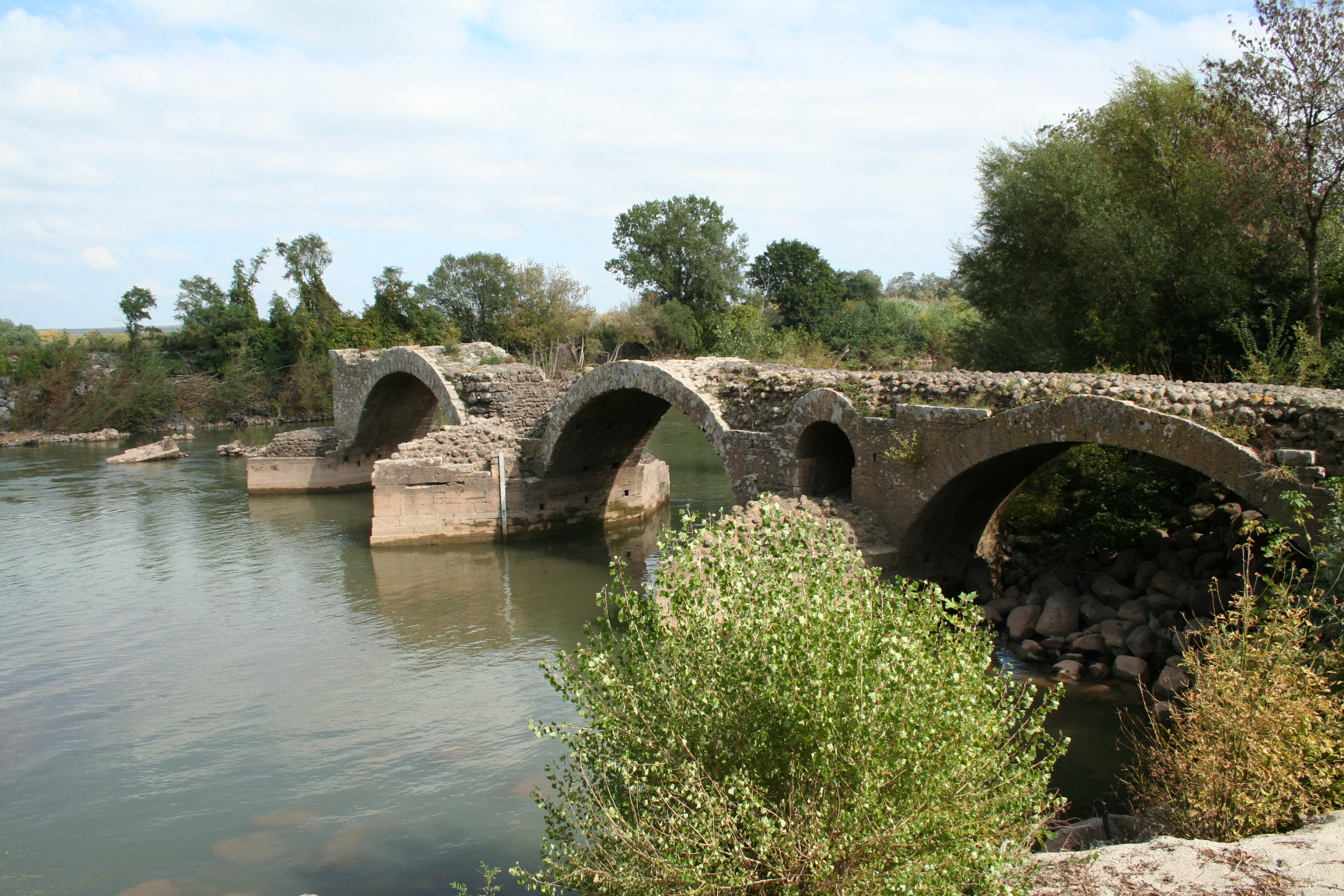
- Roman Bridge, actually medieval

- Coat of arms
- Location of Saint-Thibéry
- Location within France Location within Occitanie
- Coordinates: 43°23′52″N 3°25′03″E
- Country: France
- Region: Occitania
- Department: Hérault
- Arrondissement: Béziers
- Canton: Pézenas
- Intercommunality: CA Hérault Méditerranée

Government
  - Mayor (2020–2026): Jean Augé
- Area^{1}: 18.47 km^{2} (7.13 sq mi)
- Elevation: 19 m (62 ft)
- Highest elevation: 80 m (260 ft)
- Lowest elevation: 0 m (0 ft)
- Population (2023): 3,132
  - Density: 169.6/km^{2} (439.2/sq mi)
- Time zone: UTC+01:00 (CET)
  - Summer (DST): UTC+02:00 (CEST)
- INSEE/Postal code: 34289 /34630
- ^{1} French Land Register data, which excludes lakes, ponds, glaciers > 1 km^{2} (0.386 sq mi or 247 acres) and river estuaries.

Saint-Thibéry (French pronunciation: [sɛ̃ tibeʁi]; Occitan: Sant Tibèri) is a commune in the Hérault département in the Occitanie region in southern France.

The village of Saint-Thibéry is built at the confluence of the Rivers Thongue and Hérault. The old Roman road "Via Domitia" runs through the village (Grand Rue) and some of the houses date back to the 15th century.

Saint-Thibéry is situated between the larger towns of Agde and Pézenas and the cities Béziers and Montpellier and is a short distance to Mediterranean Sea.

Over 4000 years old, this former Celtic village was once called "Cessero".

== Saint-Thibéry Abbey and Church ==
The Benedictine Abbey (l'abbaye bénédictine) and Church sit in the heart of the village. It was founded in the late 8th century by Atilio, a disciple of Benedict Aniane, near the tomb of three local martyrs. The Abbey Church has an unusual underground altar. During the 15th century, the church was rebuilt on its original Romanesque bases, in a Gothic style. The bell-tower was erected in 1509 and had eight bells.

In the past the Church attracted many pilgrims who believed that relics kept there had special healing powers. Saint-Thibéry is also on one of the old Santiago de Compostela Pilgrimage routes.

== Saint-Thibéry mill ==
This corn (wheat) mill (moulin à bled) was built in the 13th century and is one of the best preserved mills in the region. It has four wheels powered by water from the Hérault. A Romanesque tower was used to store the grain.

The mill once belonged to the Benedictine abbots and is situated beside the so-called Roman bridge.

== Volcano ==
Mount Ramus, an extinct volcano, offers some magnificent views of the Languedoc, the Pyrenees mountains and the Mediterranean Sea with Spain off in the distance. In the village of Saint-Thibéry there are some interesting volcanic features such as the basalt “organ” columns.

There is an ancient fort on the volcano, dating from the 5th century BC. It overlooks the village and the Hérault valley.

== Saint-Thibéry rivers ==
Saint-Thibéry is situated where the River Thongue joins the Hérault. (The Hérault department is named after the latter.) The Thongue is the smaller river and flows down from the Languedoc mountains. The Hérault is 148 kilometres (92 mi) and flows from the Cévennes mountains. It reaches the Mediterranean Sea at Grau d'Agde.

== Population ==
Historical population
Year	Pop.	±% p.a.
1968	1,888	—
1975	1,808	−0.62%
1982	1,874	+0.51%
1990	2,076	+1.29%
1999	2,200	+0.65%
2007	2,281	+0.45%
2012	2,326	+0.39%
2017	2,665	+2.76%
2023	3,132	+2.73%
Source: INSEE

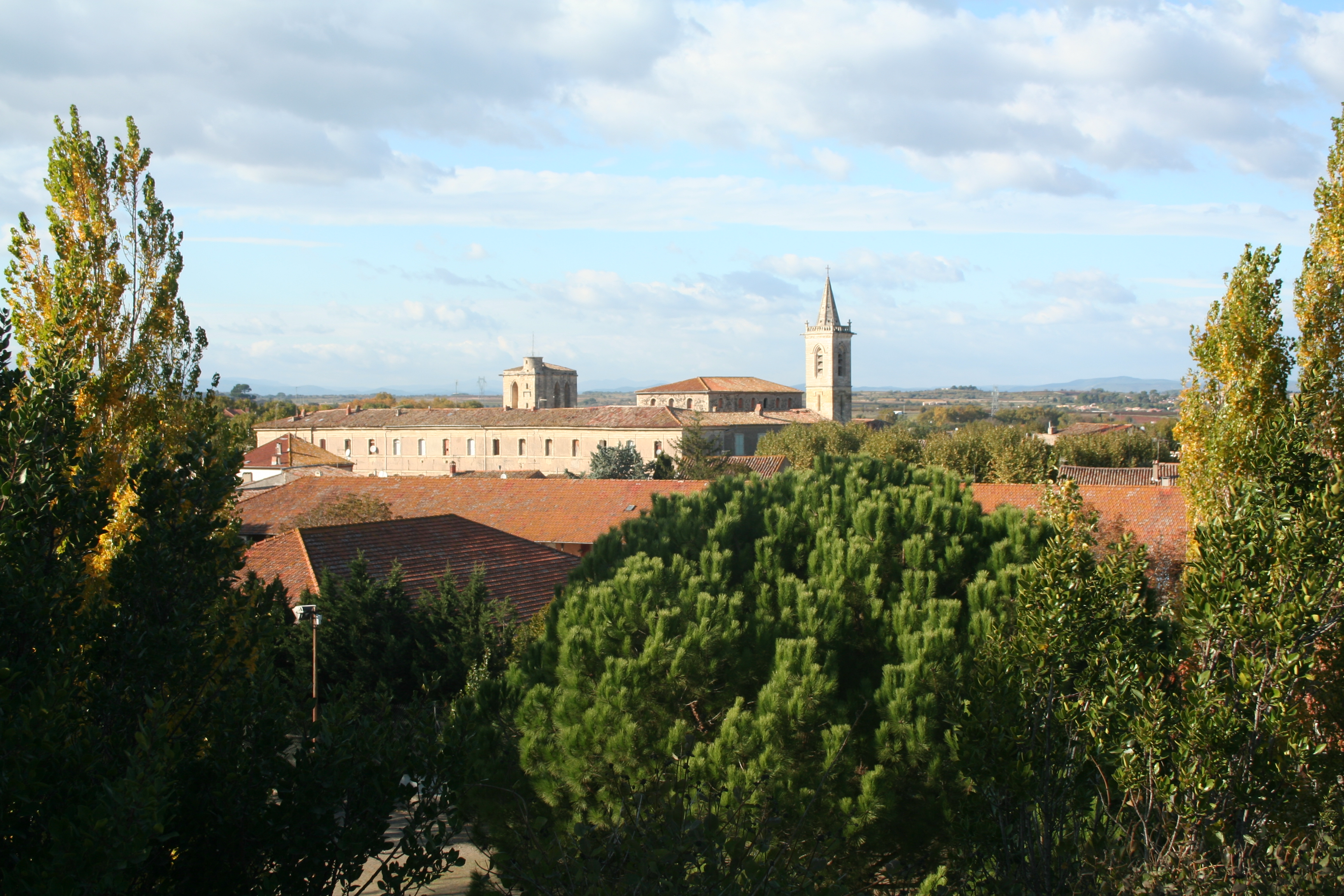
General view

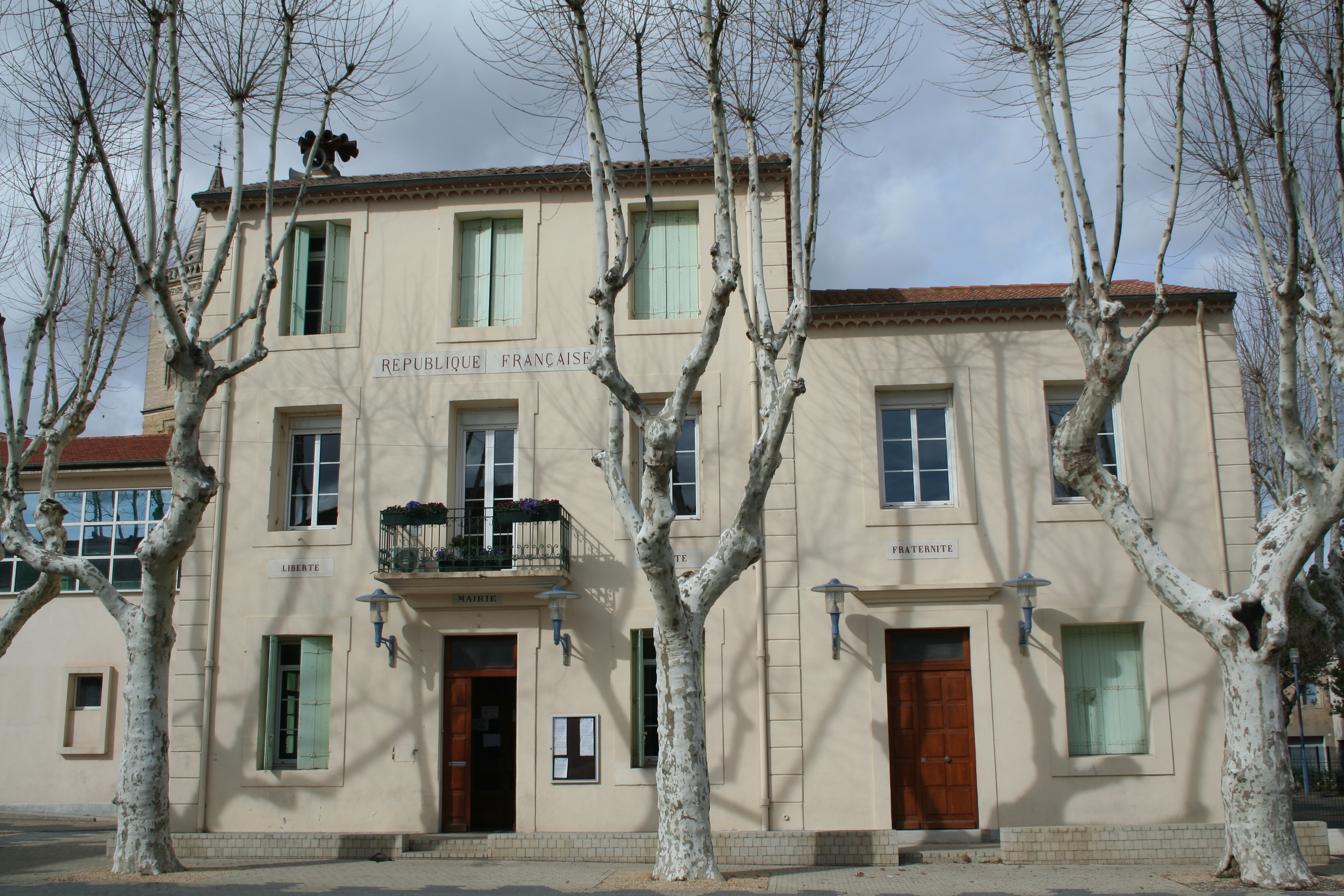
Mairie

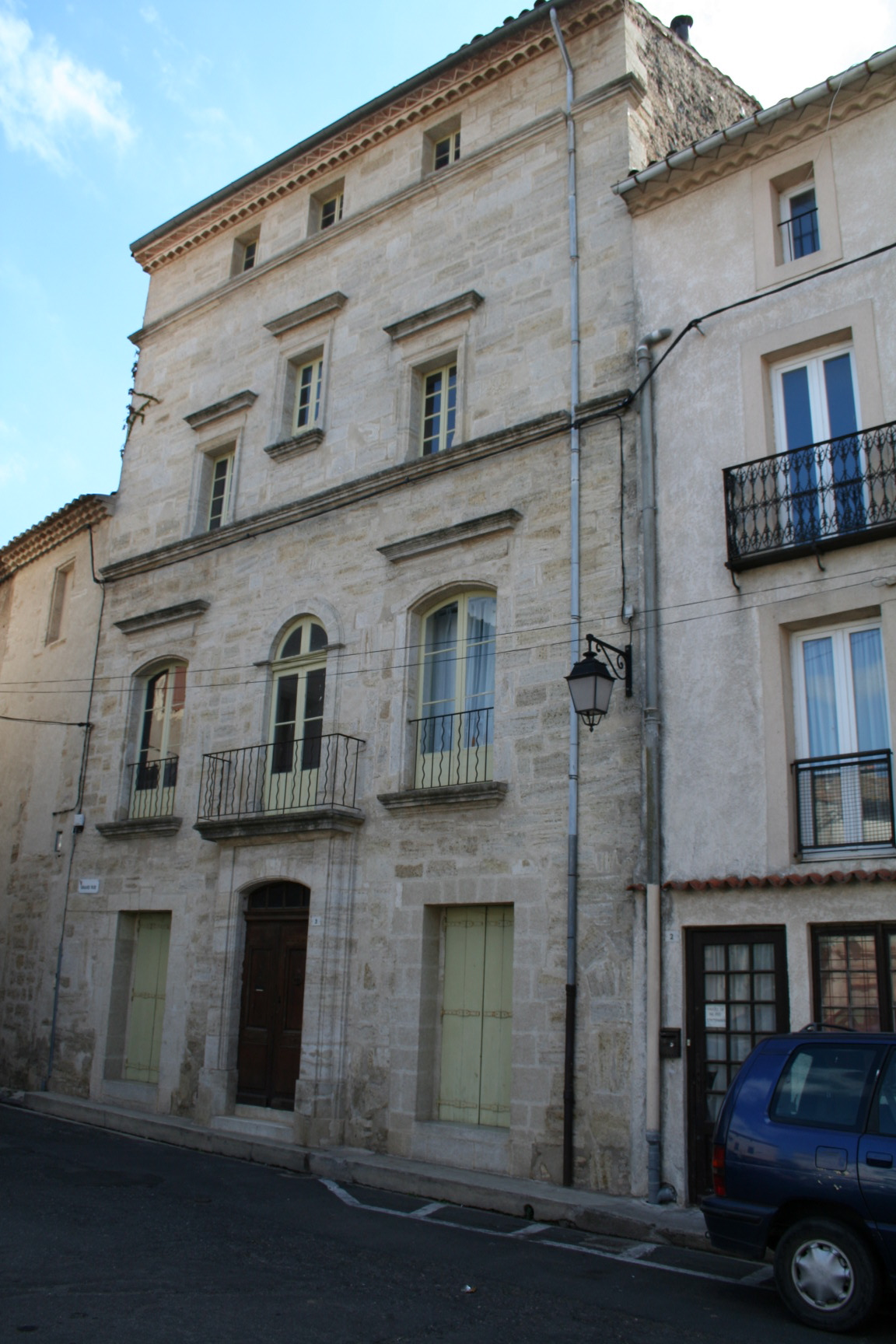
House

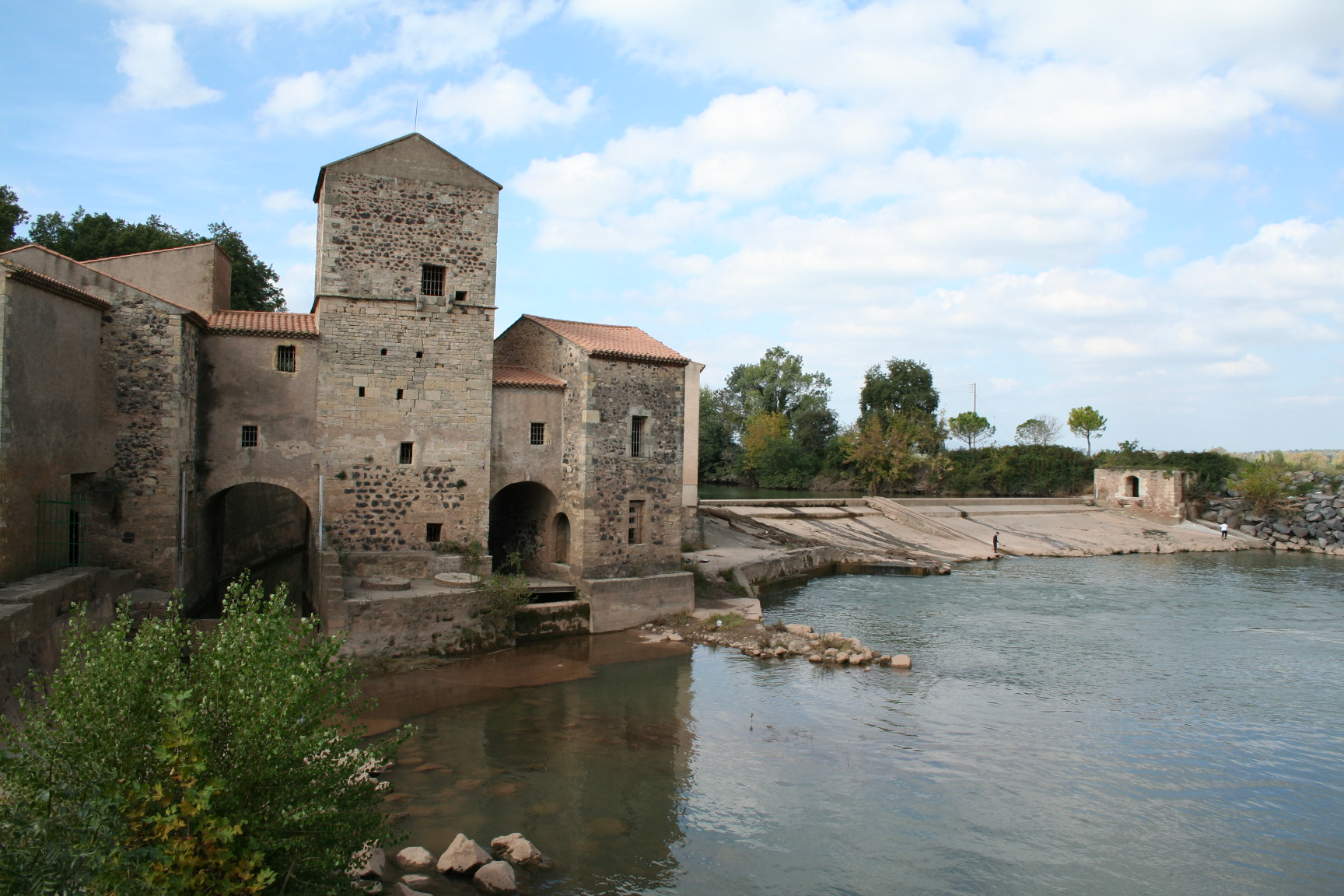
Mill

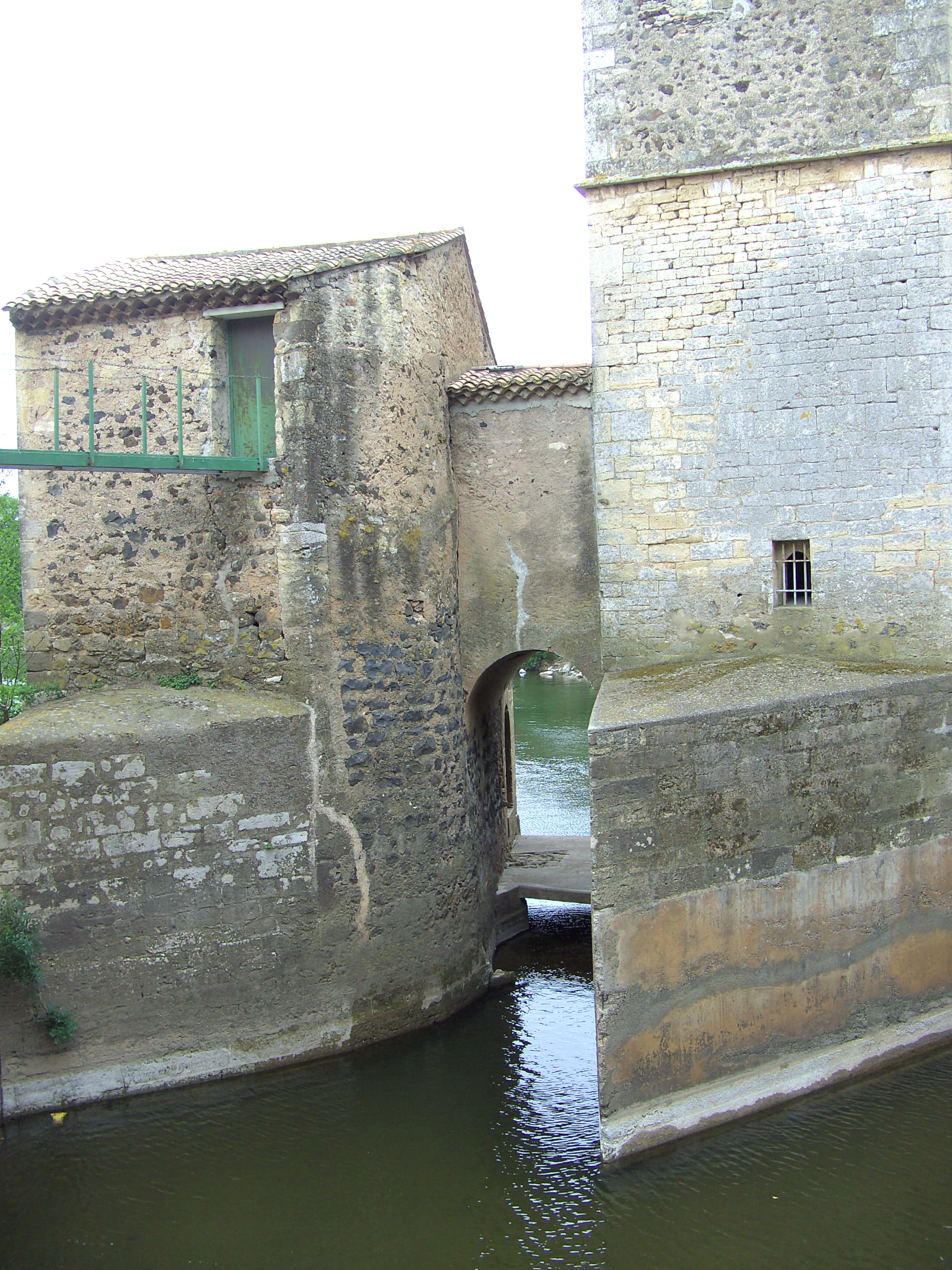
Mill race

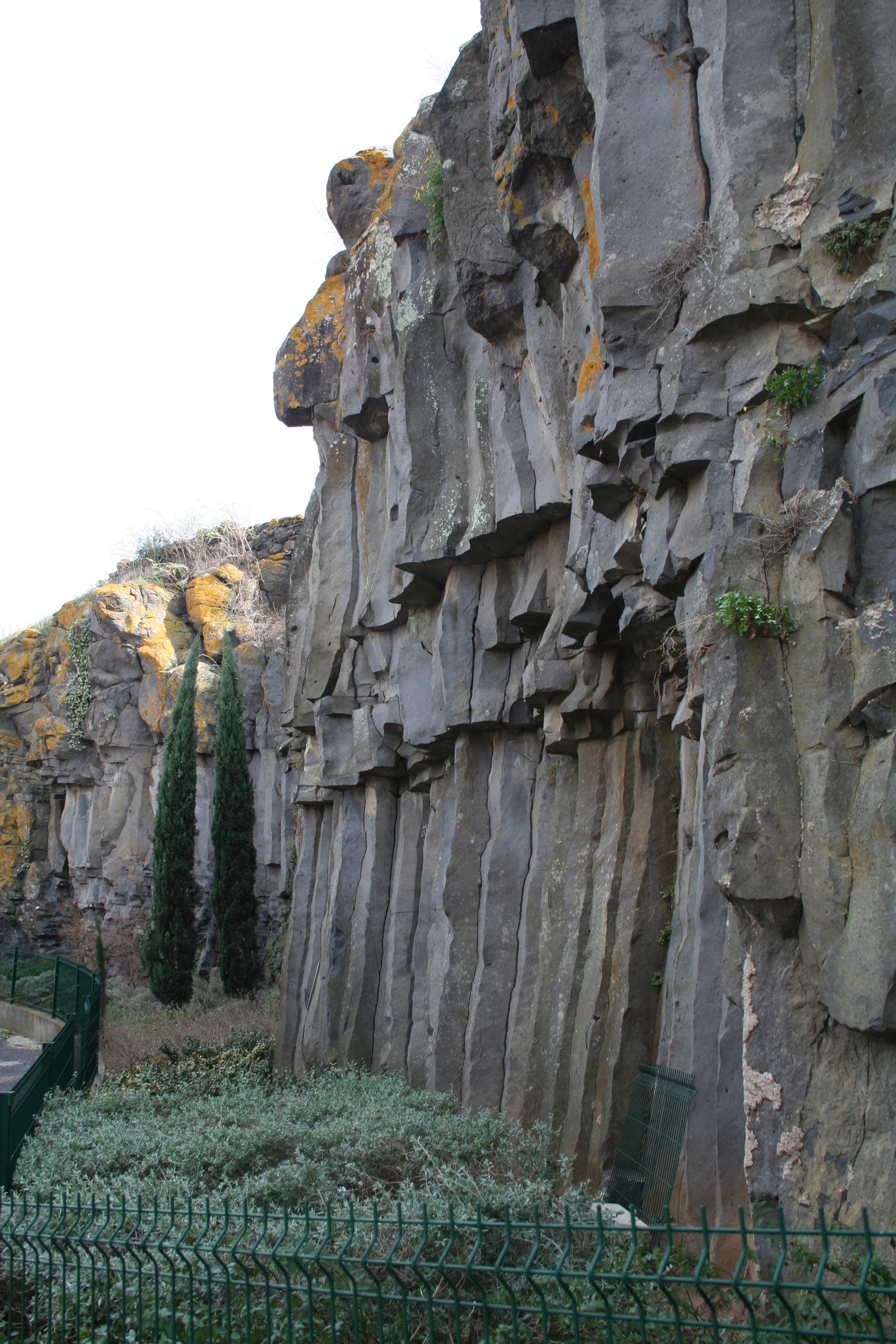
Basalt organ

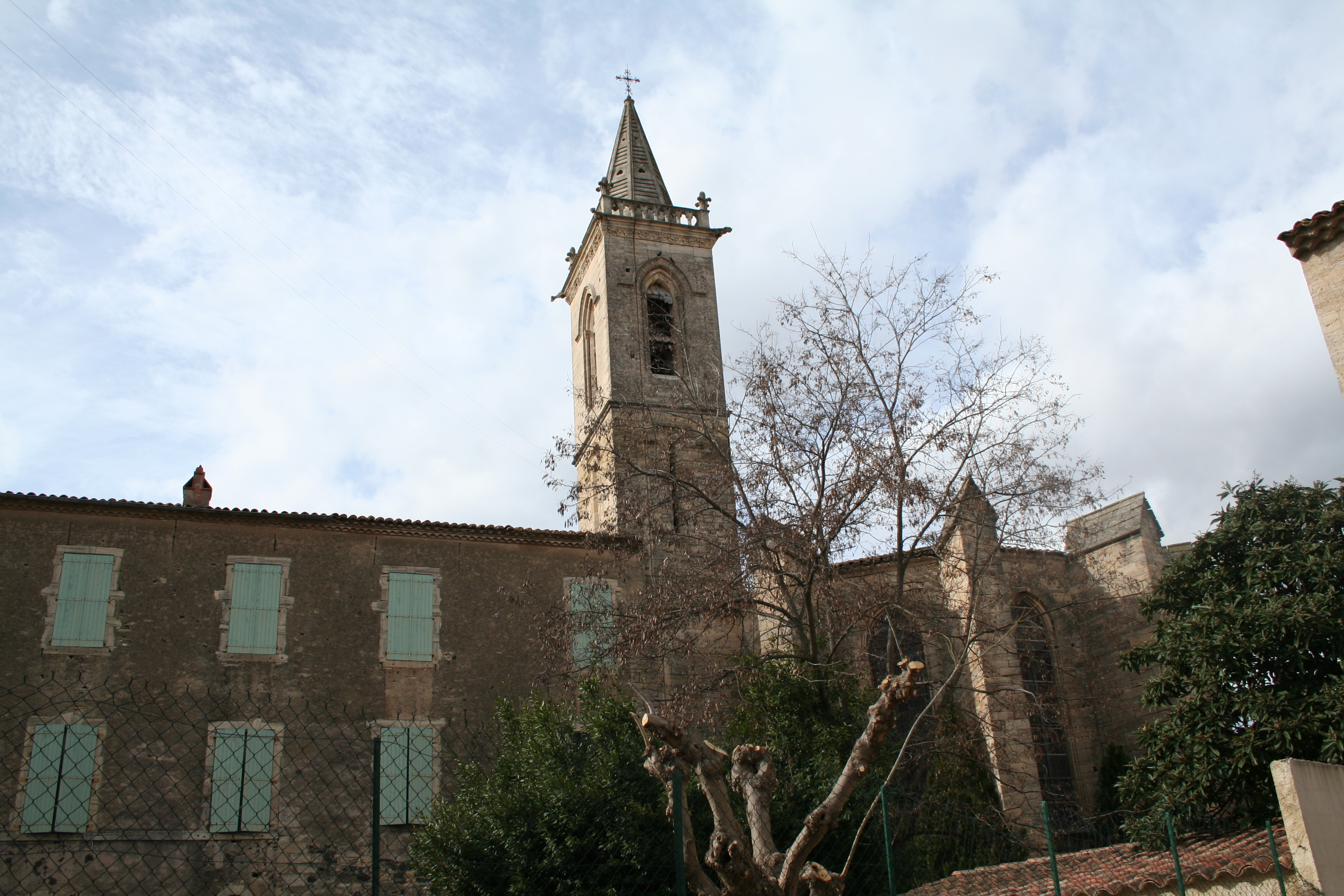
Church of Ste Marie

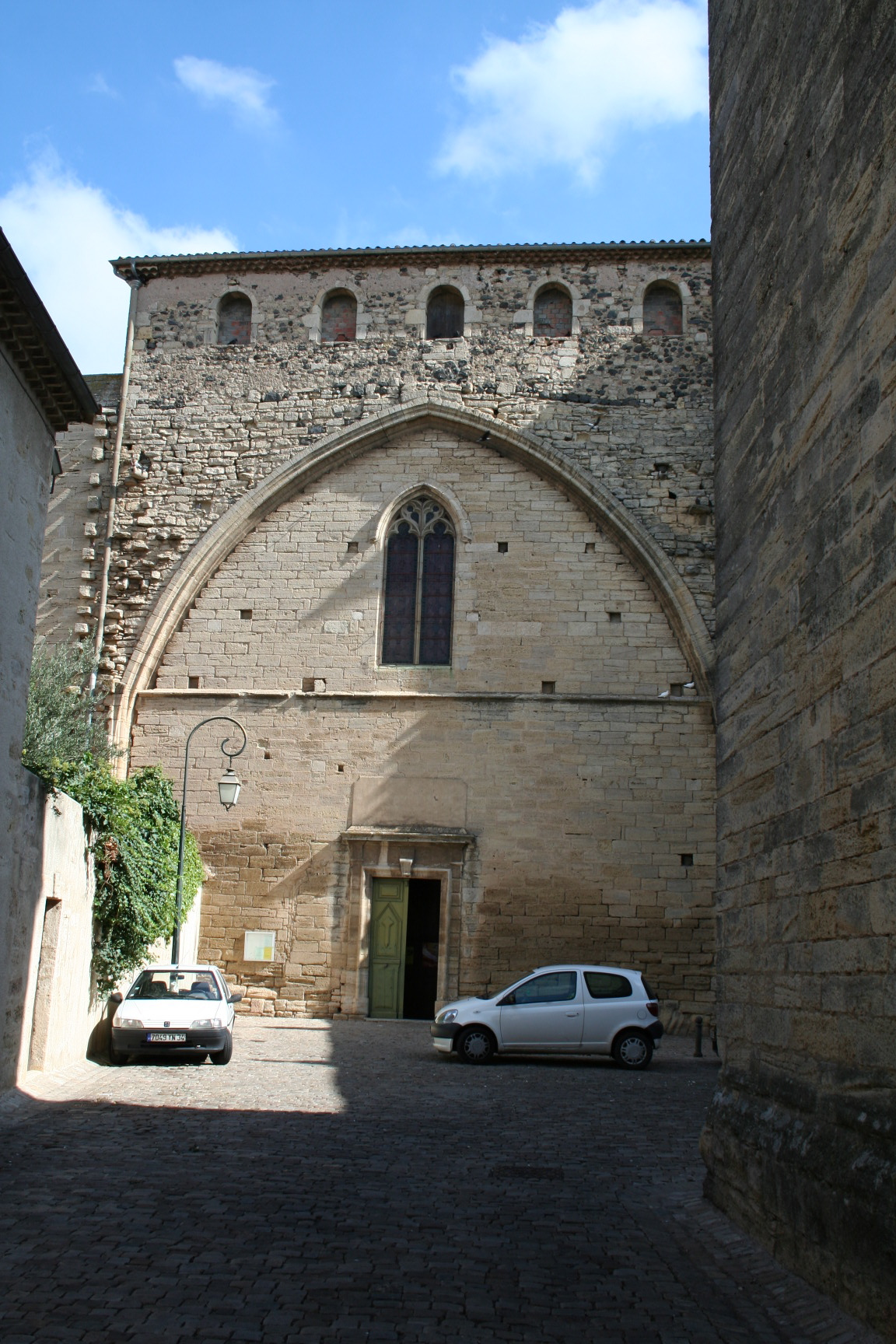
Church of Ste Marie

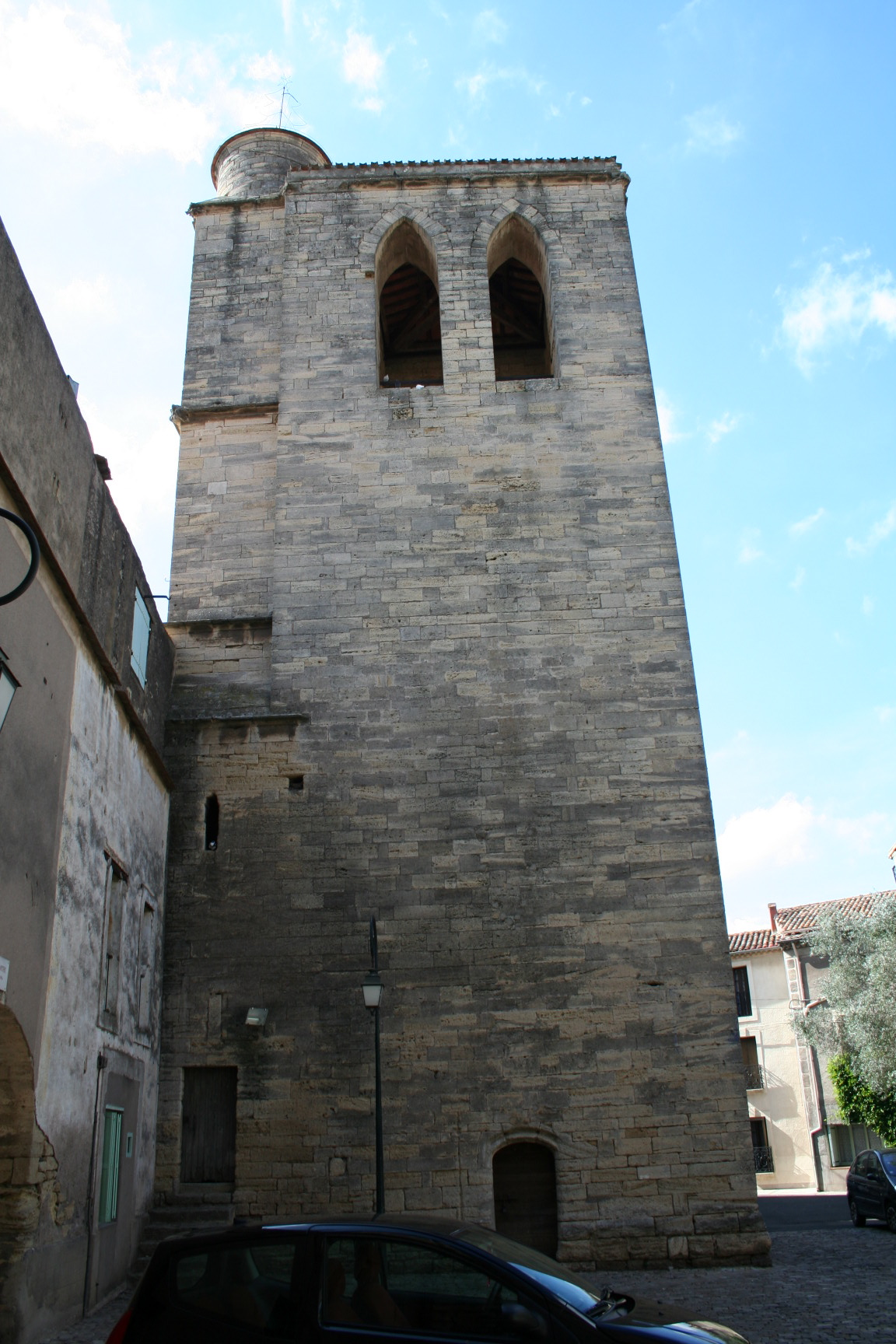
Tower

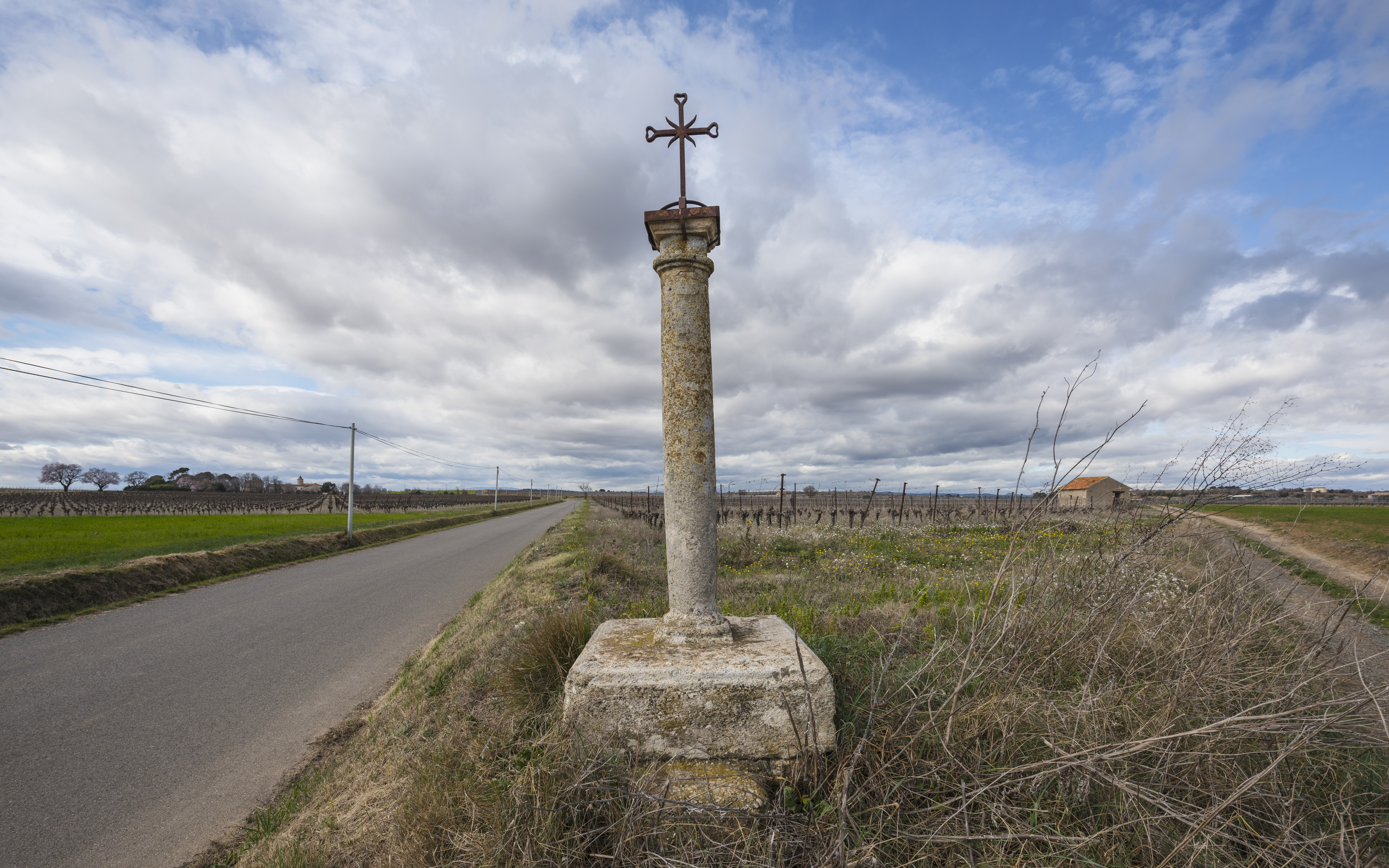
A Christian cross in border of a road

== See also ==
- Roman Bridge
- Via Domitia
- Communes of the Hérault department
