= Via Domitia =

Roman road linking Italy and Hispania through Gallia Narbonensis

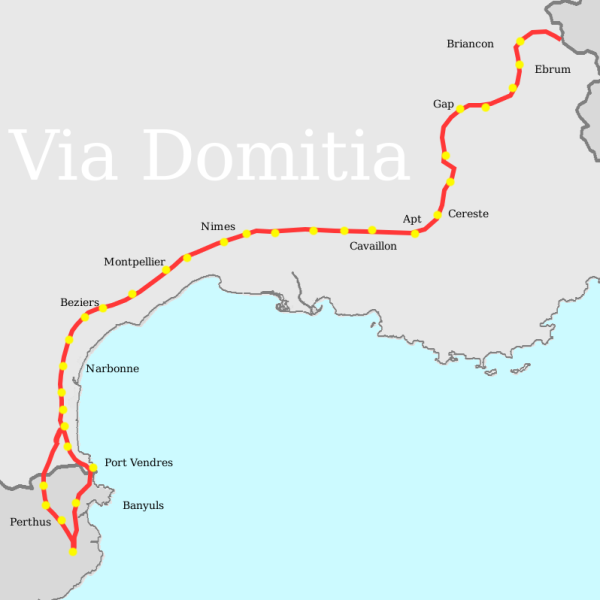
- Route of the Via Domitia
- Interactive map of Via Domitia
- Type: Roman road
- Periods: 118 BC
- Location: Briançon, France to La Junquera, Spain

History
- Built by: Gnaeus Domitius Ahenobarbus and Quintus Fabius Maximus Allobrogicus

The Via Domitia was the first Roman road built in Gaul, to link Italy and Hispania through Gallia Narbonensis, across what is now in Southern France. The route that the Romans regularised and paved was ancient when they set out to survey it, and traces the mythic route travelled by Heracles.

The construction of the road was commissioned by Gnaeus Domitius Ahenobarbus, whose name it bore, following the defeat of the Allobroges and Averni by himself and Quintus Fabius Maximus Allobrogicus in 122 BCE. Domitius also established a fortified garrison at Narbo (modern Narbonne) on the coast, near Hispania, to guard construction of the road. It soon developed into a full Roman colony Colonia Narbo Martius. The lands on the western part of the route, beyond the River Rhône had been under the control of the Averni who, according to Strabo, had stretched their control to Narbo and the Pyrenees.

Crossing the Alps by the easiest passage, the Col de Montgenèvre (1850 m), the Via Domitia followed the valley of the Durance, crossed the Rhône at Beaucaire passed through Nîmes (Nemausus) then followed the coastal plain along the Gulf of Lion. At Narbonne, it met the Via Aquitania (which led toward the Atlantic Ocean through Toulouse and Bordeaux). Thus Narbonne was a crucial strategic crossroads of the Via Domitia and the Via Aquitania, and it was an accessible, but easily defensible port at that time.

This "cusp point" in the Roman westwards expansion and ensuing supply, communication and fortification was a very important asset, and was treated as such (see Narbonne). In between the cities that it linked, the Via Domitia was provided with a series of mansiones at distances of a day's journey for a loaded cart, at which shelter, provender and fresh horses could be obtained for travellers on official business.

The route as it was in Late Antiquity is represented in schematic fashion on the Tabula Peutingeriana.

== Route ==
This route can be traced on topographical maps overprinted with the ancient route, in G. Castellve, J.-B. Compsa, J. Kotarba and A. Pezin, eds. Voies romaines du Rhône à l'Èbre: Via Domitia et Via Augusta (DAF 61) Paris 1997.

- Briançon (Brigantio)
- Chorges (Caturigomagus)
- Gap (Vapincum)
- Le Monetier Allemont (Alabons)
- Embrun (Eburodunum)
- Sisteron (Segustero)
- Lurs (Alaunium)
- Céreste (Catuiacia)
- Apt (Apta Julia)
- Notre Dame des Lumières (Ad Fines)
- Cavaillon (Cabellio)
- Saint-Rémy-de-Provence (Glanum)
- Saint-Gabriel (Ernaginum)
- Beaucaire (Ugernum)
- Nîmes (Nemausus)
- Ambrussum
- Lunel-Vieil
- Castelnau-le-Lez (Sextantio)
- Montpellier route remains unknown
- Montbazin (Forum Domitii)
- Mèze
- Pinet
- Saint-Thibéry (Cessero) and its Roman bridge
- Béziers (Baeterris)
- Narbonne (Narbo Martius) At Narbonne, a section of the Via Domitia is exposed in the Place de l'Hôtel de Ville. The Via Domitia crossed the Atax (the Aude) by a seven-arched bridge at the site of the Pont des Marchands.
- Fitou (Ad Viscensimum)
- Salses (Ad Salsulae)
- Perpignan
- Ruscino

At Ruscino, the road separates in two: the Inland Route and the Coastal Route, which rejoin at La Jonquera.

Coastal Route

- Elne (Illiberis)
- Saint-Cyprien
- Argelès
- Collioure
- Port-Vendres (Portus Veneris)
- Banyuls

Inland Route

- Montescot
- Le Boulou
- Les Cluses (Clausurae)
- Le Perthus (Col de Panissars), at the Trophy of Pompey

Rejoins at:

- La Jonquera (Deciana)

Here the Via Augusta begins.

== Roman bridges ==
There are the remains of several Roman bridges along the road, including the Roman Bridge of Saint-Thibéry, the Pont Ambroix at Ambrussum, the Pont Julien and the Pont Serme.

Images for the Via Domitia

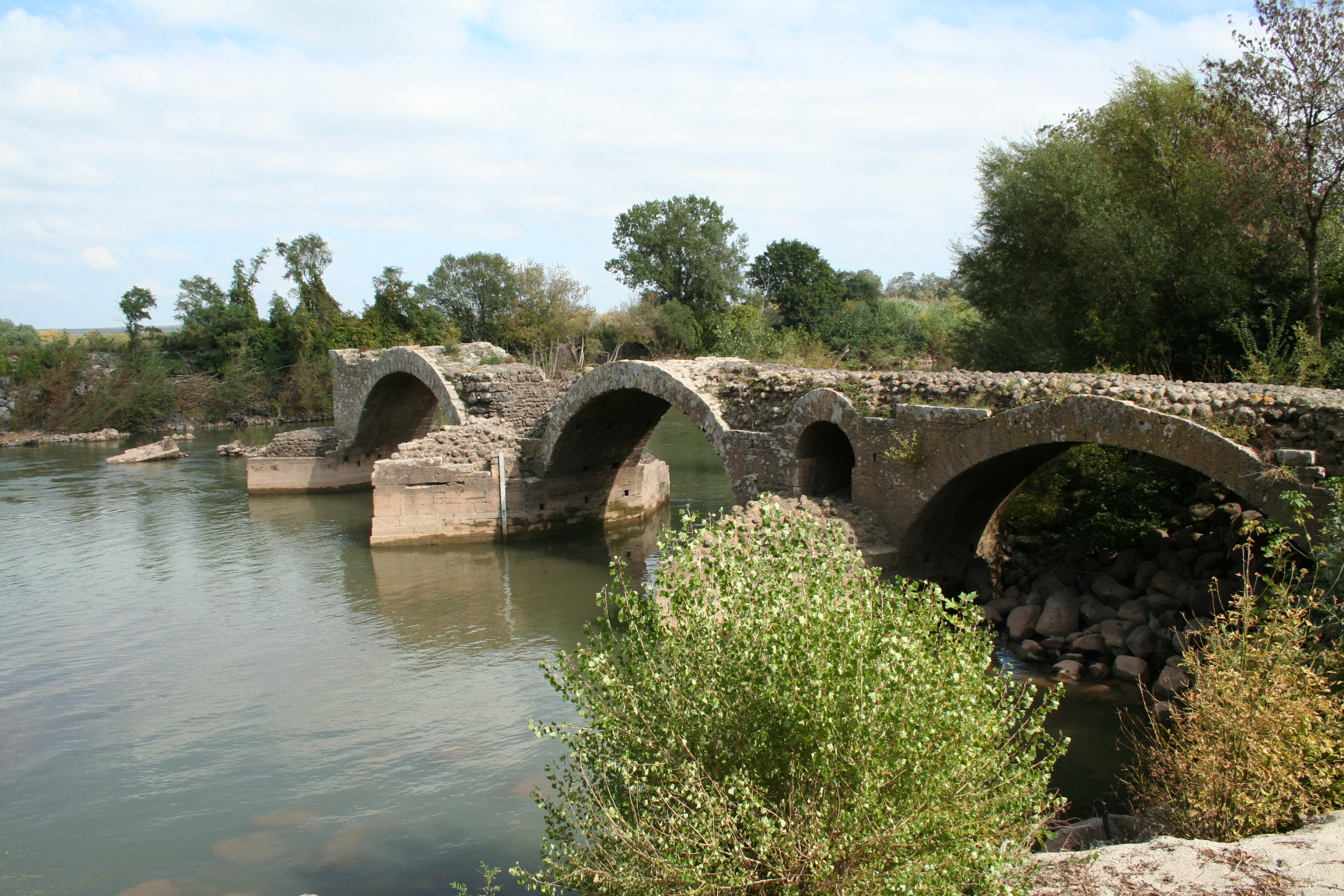
St-Thibéry: Roman Bridge

Via Domitia in (pink)

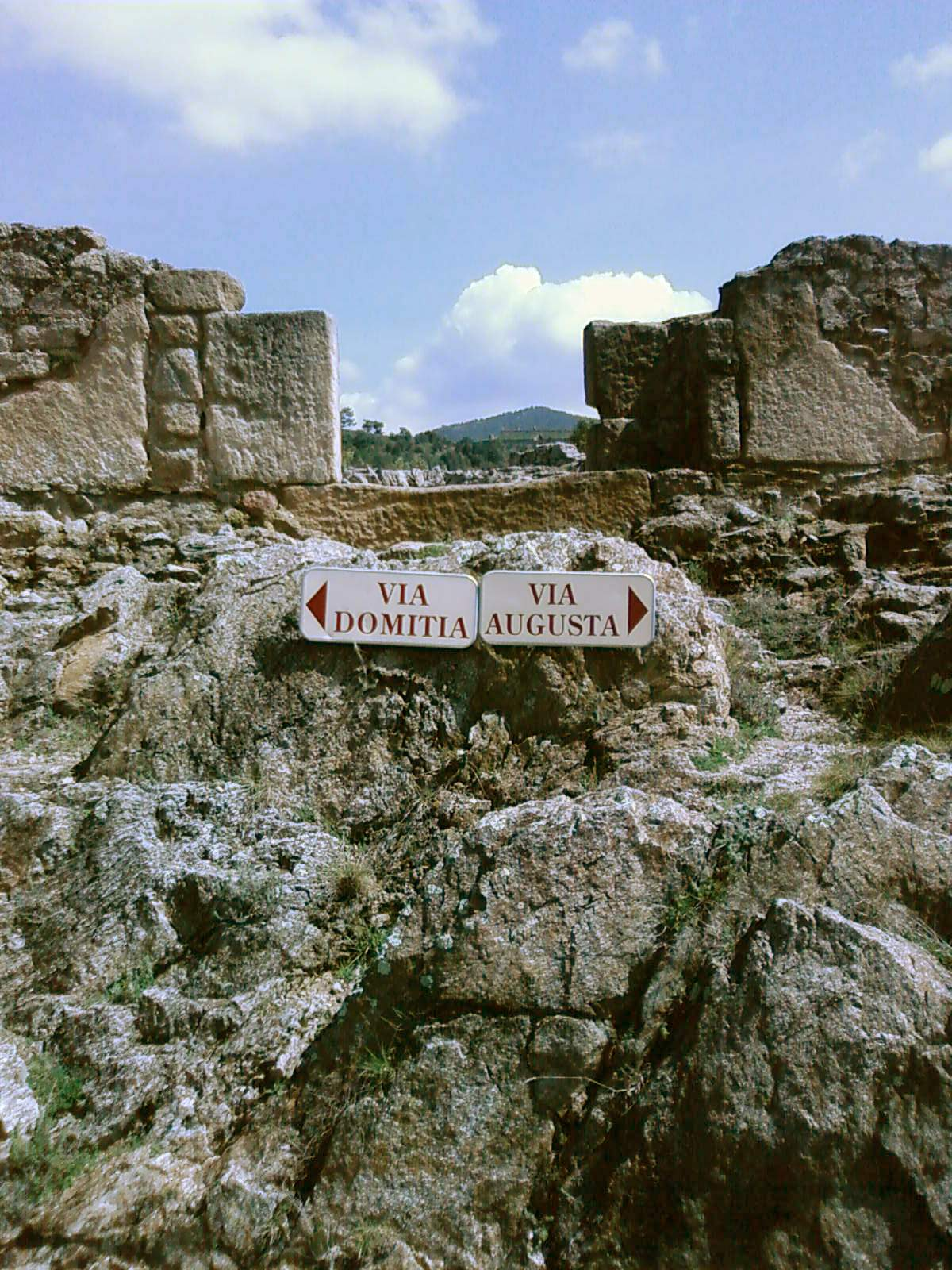
Via Domitia and Via Augusta junction at the Trophy of Pompey

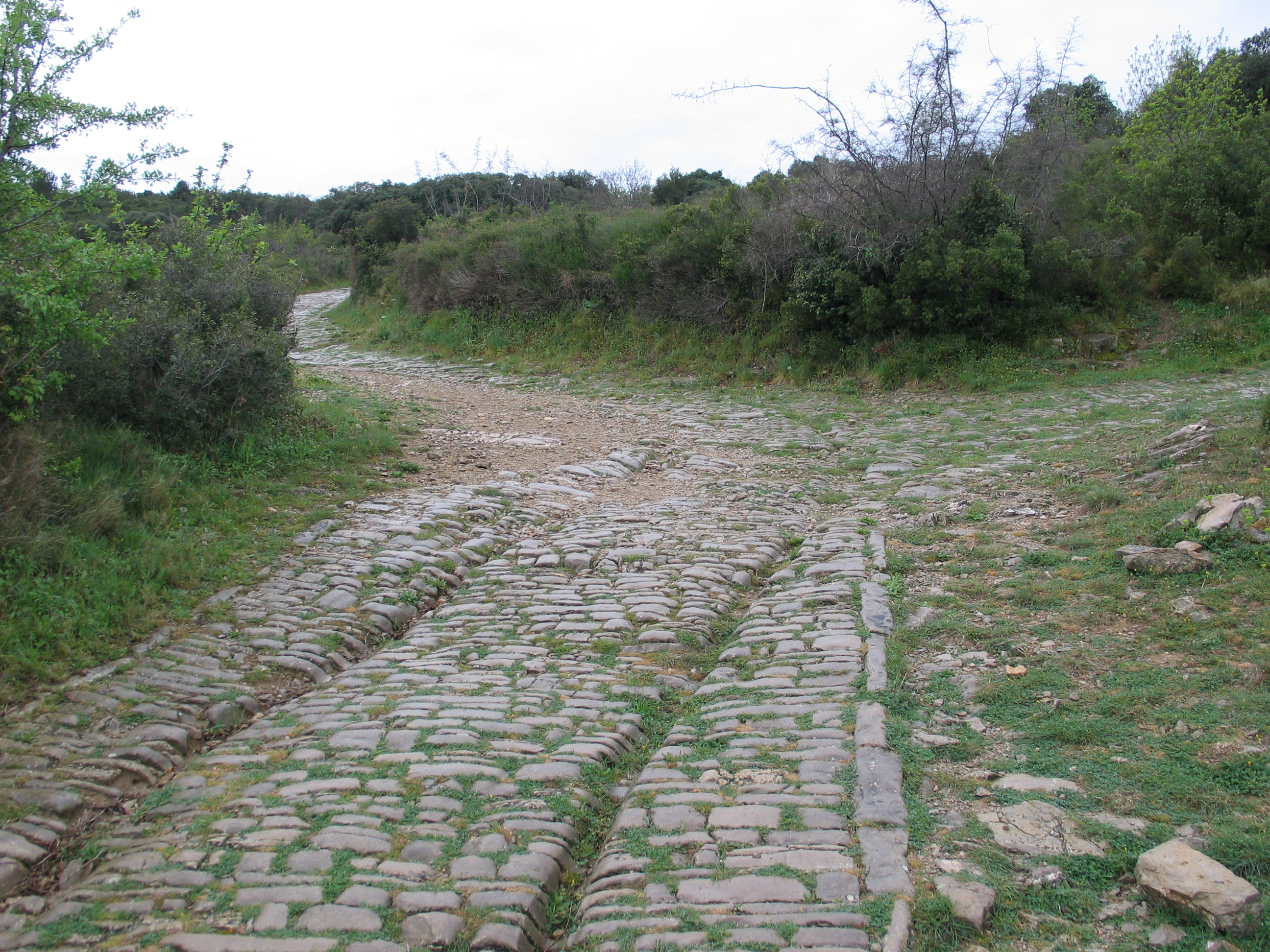
Chariot ruts in the Via Domitia

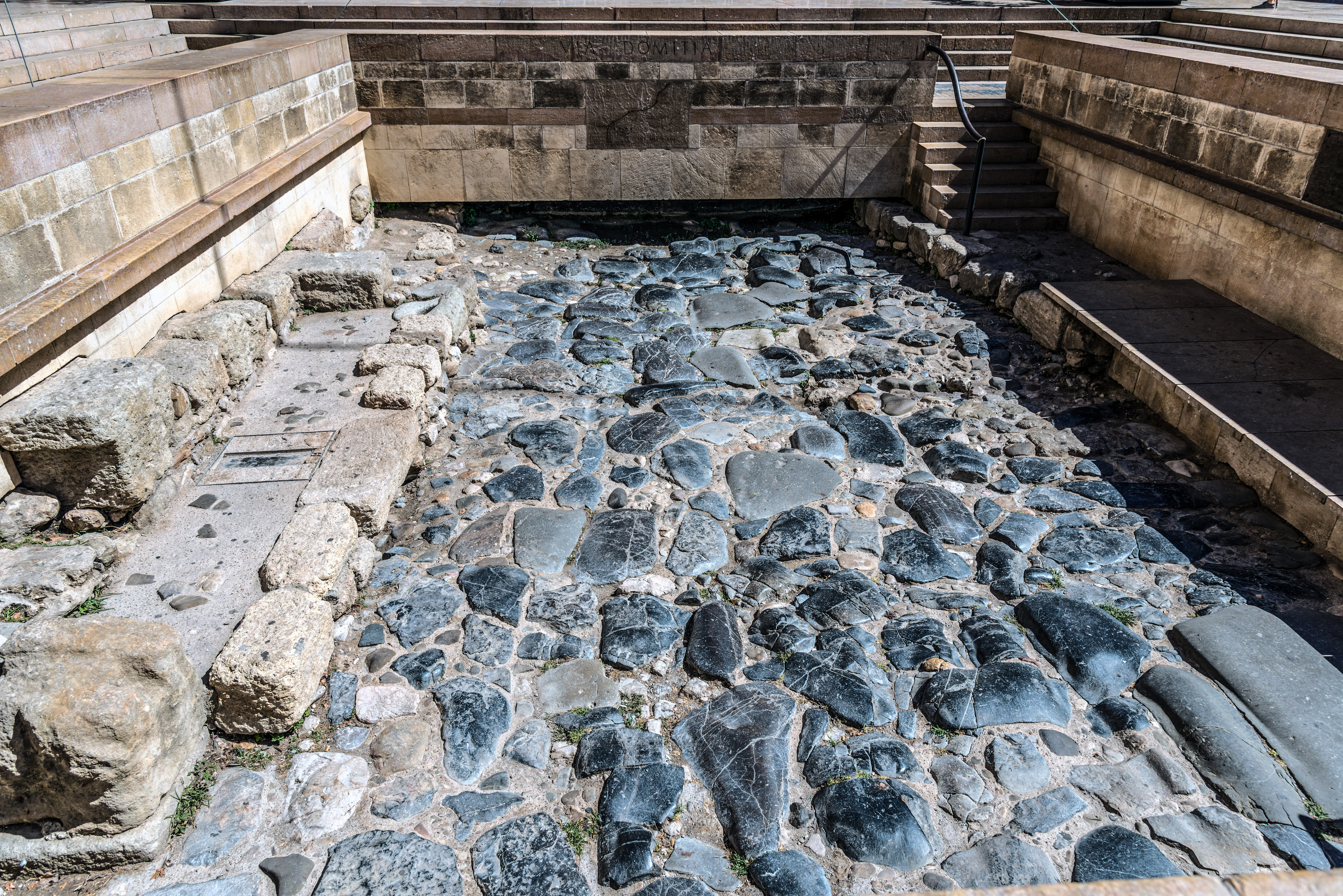
Narbonne: Via Domitia uncovered in front of the Archbishop's palace

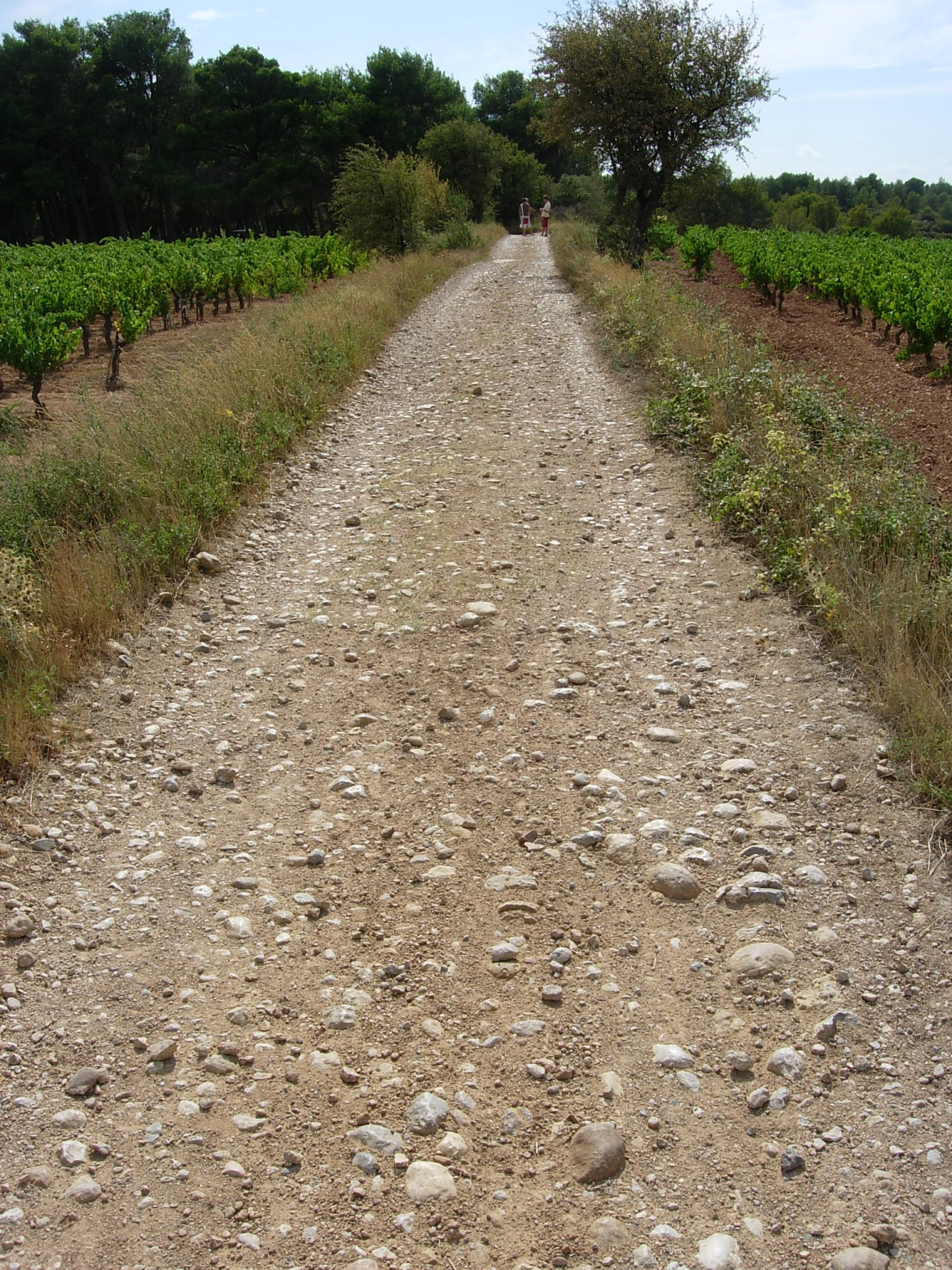
The Via Domitia in Pinet, Hérault

== See also ==
- Roman roads
- Roman bridge
- Roman engineering
- Gnaeus Domitius Ahenobarbus
- Quintus Fabius Maximus Allobrogicus

== Bibliography ==
- Raymond Chevalier, Les Voies Romaines, Picard, Paris, 1997. ISBN 2-7084-0526-8
- Pierre A. Clement and Alain Peyre, La Voie Domitienne: De la Via Domitia aux routes de l'an 2000, Presses du Languedoc/Max Chaleil Editeur, 1992. ISBN 2-85998-097-0
- Pierre A. Clement, La Via Domitia: Des Pyrénées aux Alpes, Editions Ouest-France, Rennes, 2005. ISBN 2-7373-3508-6
