= Via Aquitania =

Via Aquitania in red.

The Via Aquitania was a Roman road created in 118 BC in the Roman province of Gaul. It started at Narbonne, where it connected to the Via Domitia. It then went toward the Atlantic Ocean, via Toulouse and Bordeaux, covering approximately 400 kilometres (250 mi).

== Founding ==
Gnaeus Domitius Ahenobarbus, along with Quintus Fabius Maximus Allobrogicus, defeated the Allobroges and Arverni tribes in Gaul in 121 BC. This eliminated almost all opposition to the Romans in southern Gaul. Some portions of the coast were still controlled by local tribes, but this did not hinder trade. Rome received tribute from Gauls all the way to Toulouse. Gnaeus Domitius Ahenobarbus later served as proconsul in Gaul. In 118 BC, he founded the town of Narbo Martius, modern-day Narbonne, and built the Via Domitia to make travel to Spain easier. The Via Aquitania is an offshoot of the Via Domitia that goes through southwestern Gaul into the province of Aquitania. It is unknown who commissioned the Via Aquitania, but it is likely that Domitius Ahenobarbus built it in order to easily exact tributes from the newly conquered tribes.

== Route ==
The Via Aquitania was the main Roman road in the province of Aquitania. The province of Aquitania is located in southwestern Gaul. It is bordered on the south and east by the Pyrenees, on the west by the Atlantic Ocean, and on the north by the Loire River. The Via Aquitania begins in Narbonne, where it connects to the Via Domitia. Narbonne was the first Roman colony in Gaul. Its purpose was to be an agricultural colony. Narbonne later became an important trade hub in the time of Augustus. During the Pax Romana, traveling became safer. This led to an increase in trade.

In addition to Narbonne, two other important cities, Toulouse and Bordeaux, were situated along the Via Aquitania. The Via Aquitania was the main trade route which connected the Atlantic seaways to Toulouse and Narbonne. At Toulouse, the Via Aquitania intersected with roads leading north to Lyon, which was a main intersection of Gallic roads. Toulouse later became the Visigoth capital. The Via Aquitania ended in Burdigala, modern-day Bordeaux. Bordeaux was an important international trade city, due to its proximity to the Atlantic Ocean. After Gaul was divided into the three provinces of Aquitania, Belgica, and Lugdunensis, Bordeaux became the capital of Aquitania. The Via Aquitania connected these important cities in southern Gaul.
