= Roman Bridge (Saint-Thibéry) =

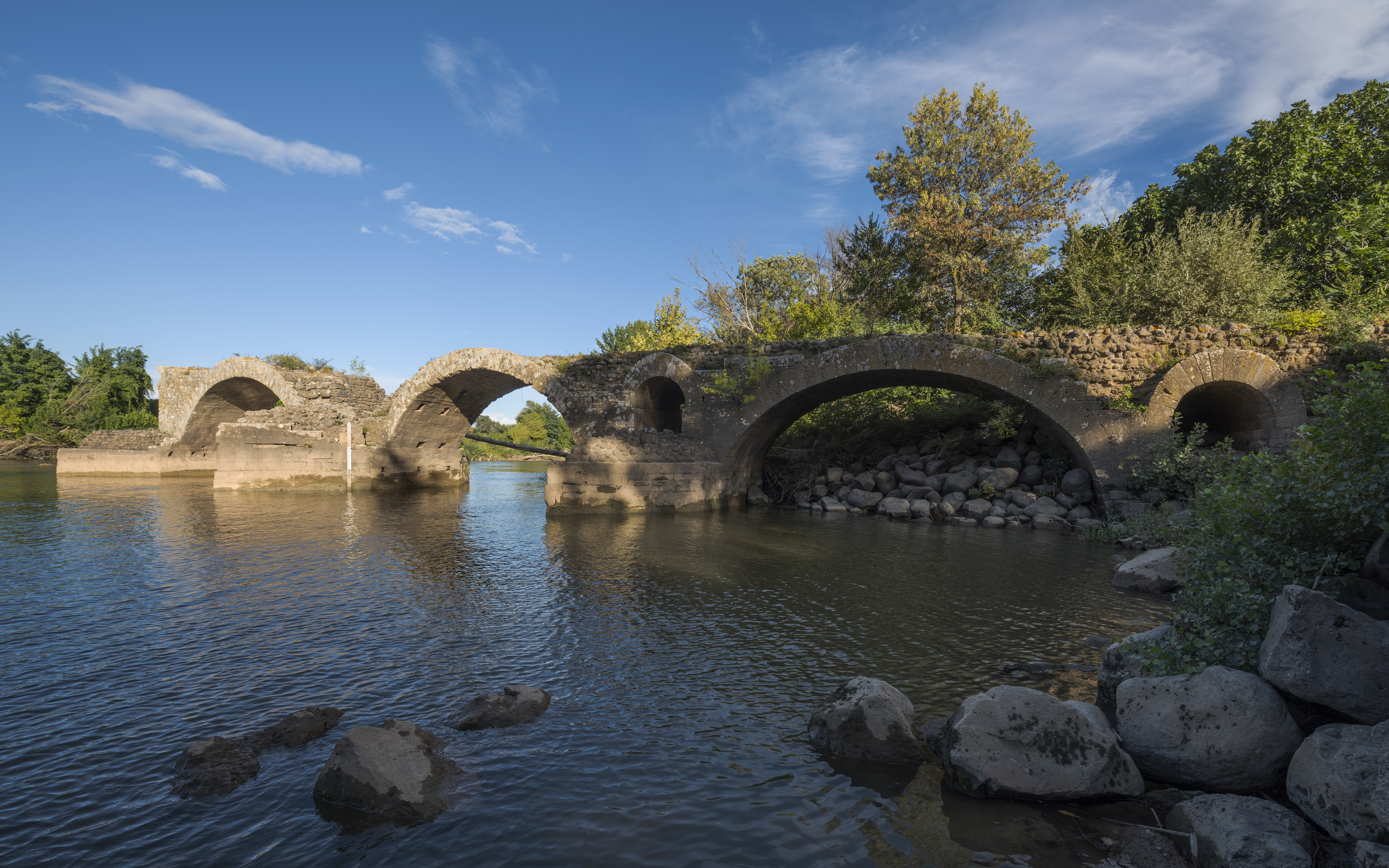
- Coordinates: 43.392887°N 3.432836°E
- Carries: Via Domitia
- Crosses: Hérault
- Locale: Saint-Thibéry, Hérault, France

Characteristics
- Design: Segmental arch bridge
- Material: Stone
- Total length: Approximately 150 m (490 ft)
- Width: 4 m (13 ft)
- Longest span: 12 m (39 ft)
- No. of spans: 9

History
- Construction end: Reign of Augustus (30 BC–14 AD)

Location
- Interactive map of Roman Bridge

The Roman Bridge at Saint-Thibéry (French: Pont romain de Saint-Thibéry) was a Roman bridge on the Via Domitia in southern France. The partly surviving structure crossed the river Hérault in Saint-Thibéry, 17 km (11 mi) east of Béziers.

== Construction ==
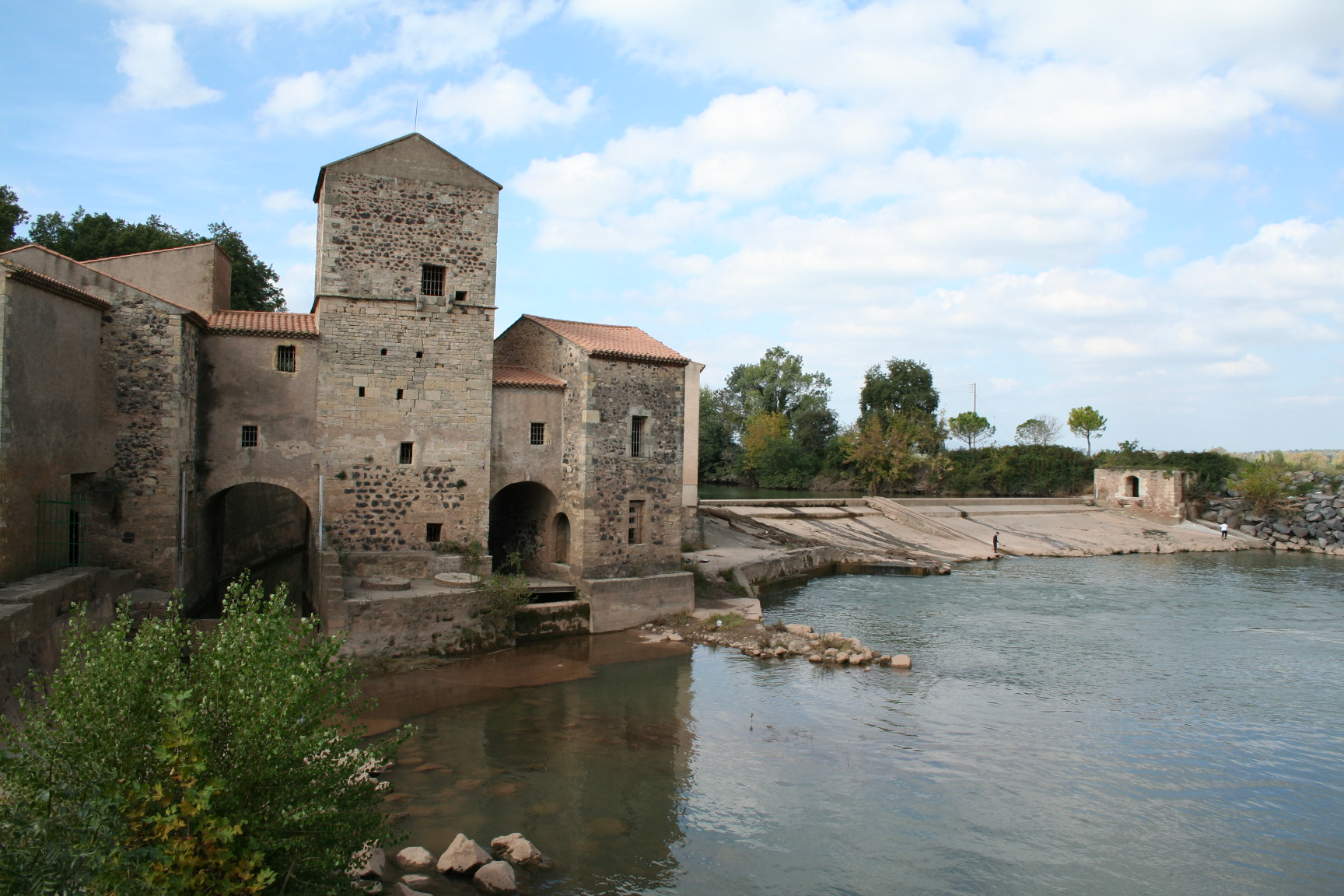
Nearby water mill

The ancient bridge had nine arches with spans of 10–12 m. The roadway rested on wide piers, which were protected on both sides by arched floodways and large cutwaters. The original length of the structure is estimated as 150 m (490 ft), its road width as 4 m. The missing spans are known to have been destroyed by a flood some time before 1536.

The remaining arches, with a span to rise ratio of 3.3:1 (115°) or more, show a visibly flatter profile than the semi-circular arches usually preferred by Roman engineers (180°). The rib thickness varies between one-tenth to one-twentieth of the span, corresponding to a common ratio also observed at a number of other Roman stone bridges. The structure is dated to the reign of emperor Augustus (r. 27 BC – AD 14). Immediately upstream an old water mill and its millrace is located.

== See also ==
- List of Roman bridges
- Roman architecture
- Roman engineering

== Sources ==
- O’Connor, Colin (1993), Roman Bridges, Cambridge University Press, pp. 98f. (G11), 169–171, ISBN 0-521-39326-4
