= Pont Julien =

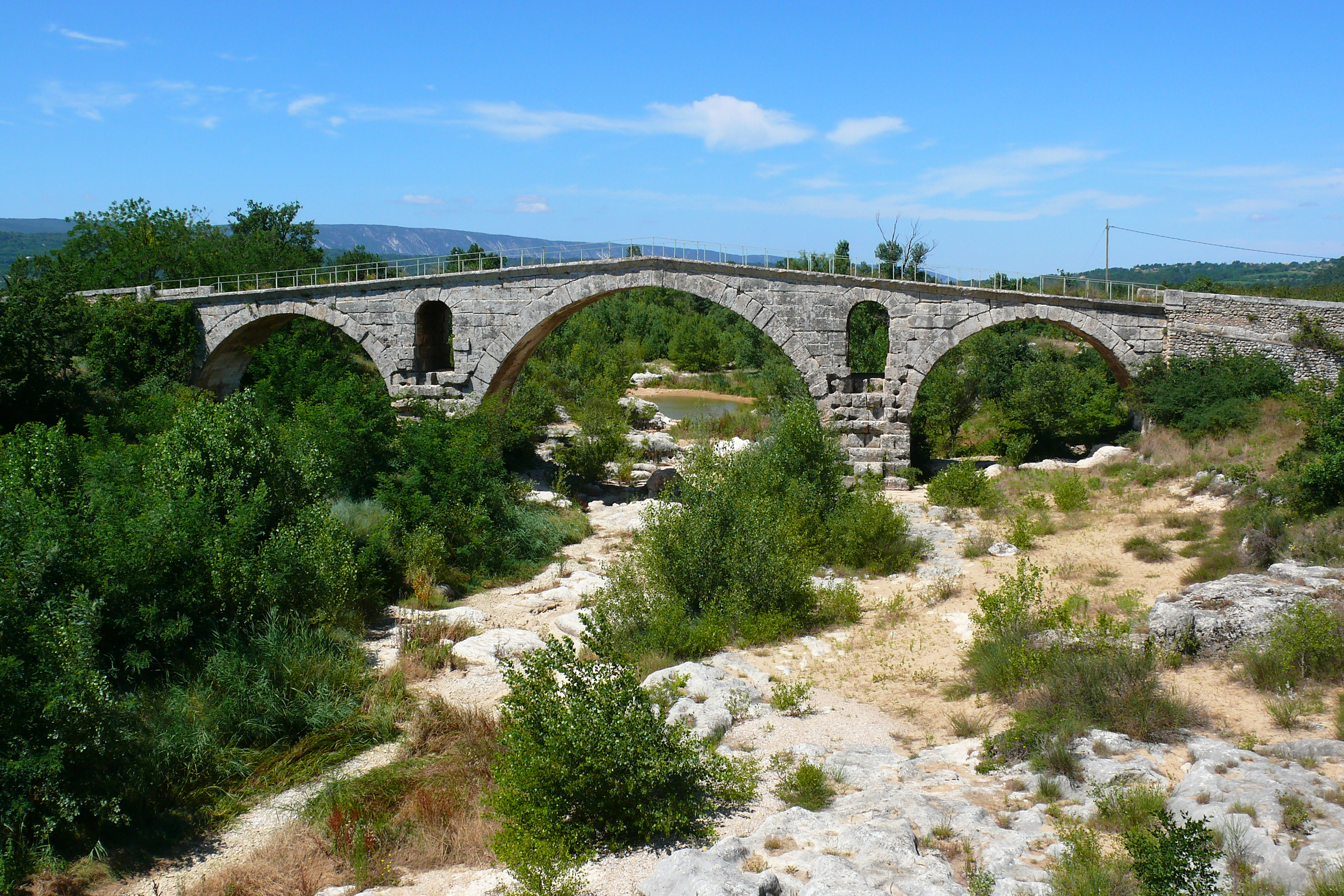
- Pont Julien
- Coordinates: 43°51′45″N 5°18′28″E
- Carries: Via Domitia
- Crosses: Calavon
- Locale: Near Bonnieux, Vaucluse, France

Characteristics
- Design: Arch bridge
- Material: Limestone
- Total length: 85 m
- Width: 5.50 m
- Longest span: 16.3 m
- No. of spans: 3
- Clearance below: 9 m

History
- Construction end: 3 BC

Location
- Interactive map of Pont Julien

The Pont Julien (French pronunciation: [pɔ̃ ʒyljɛ̃]; Julian Bridge) is a Roman stone arch bridge over the Calavon river, in the southeast of France, dating from 3 BC. The supporting columns are notable for openings to allow floodwater to pass through. It is located in the territory of the commune of Bonnieux, north of the village of the same name, and 8 km west of Apt. Originally, it was built on the Via Domitia, an important Roman road which connected Italy to the Roman territories in France. It was used for car traffic until 2005, when a replacement bridge was built to preserve it from wear and tear. It is still used as bike- and footpath, and the Veloroute du Calavon, a 37 km (23 miles) bike path, now crosses over the Pont Julien. This amounts to approximately 2000 years of uninterrupted use.

== Gallery ==
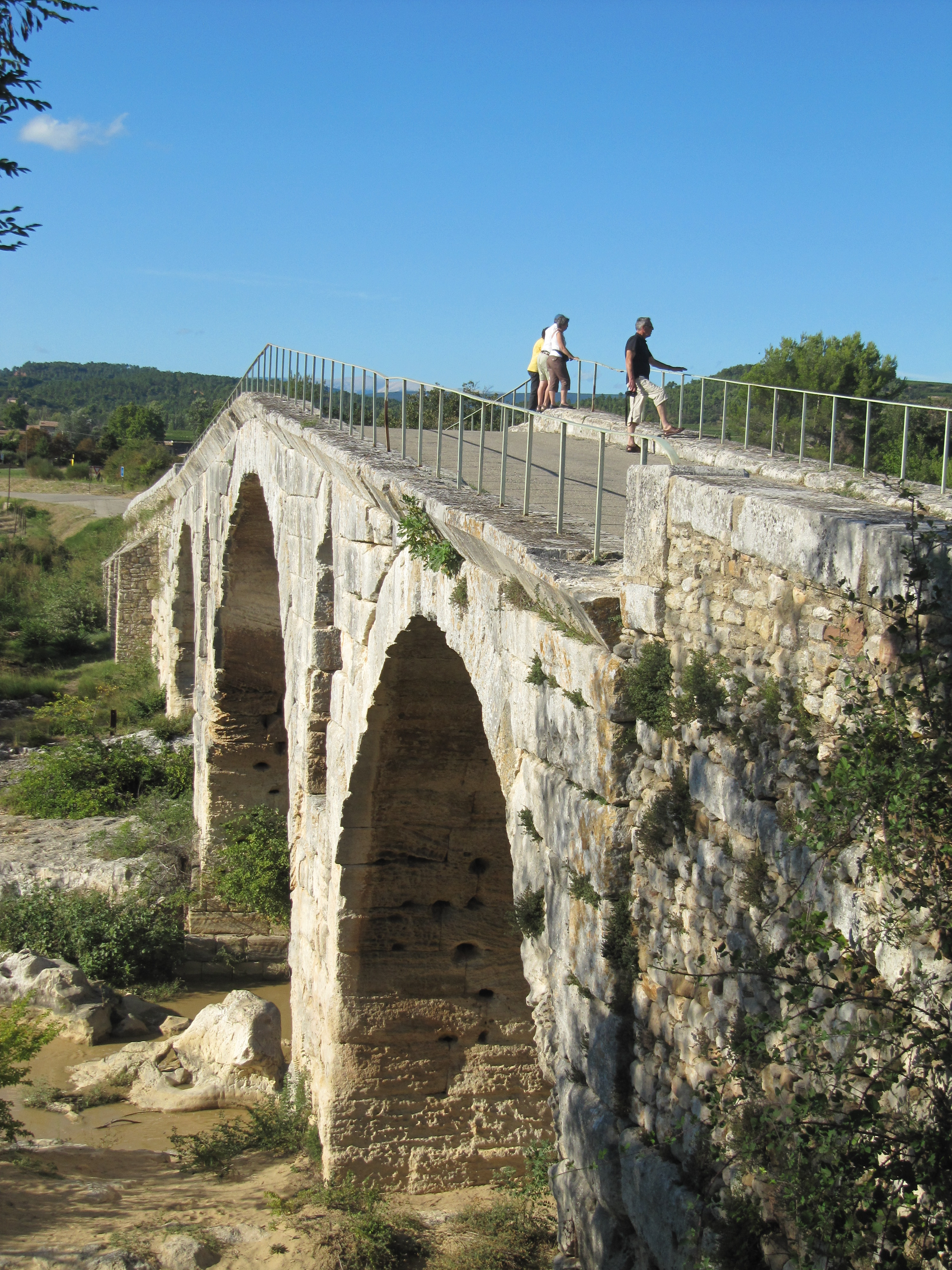
View of the Pont Julien

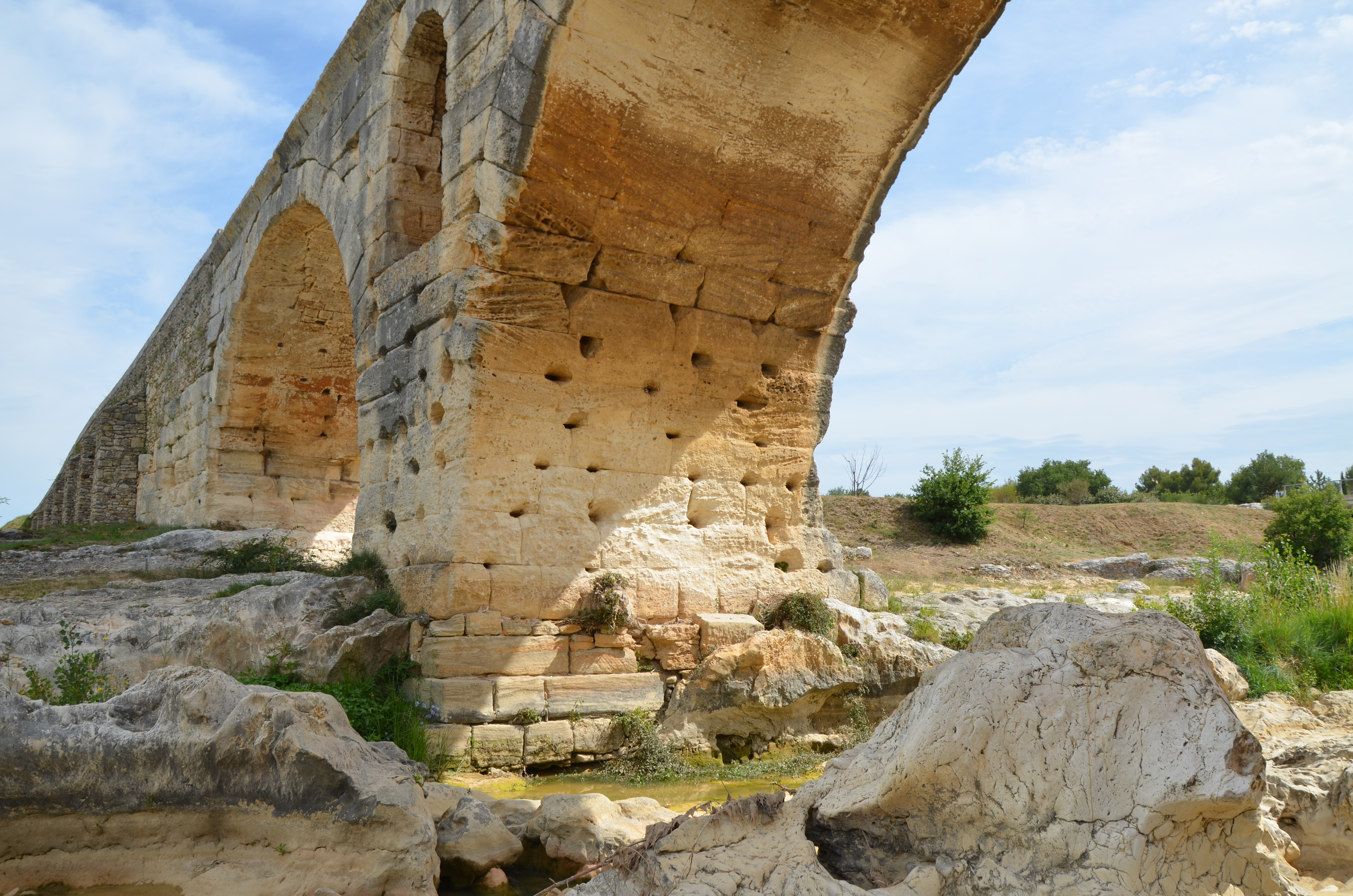
View of the underside of one of the arches

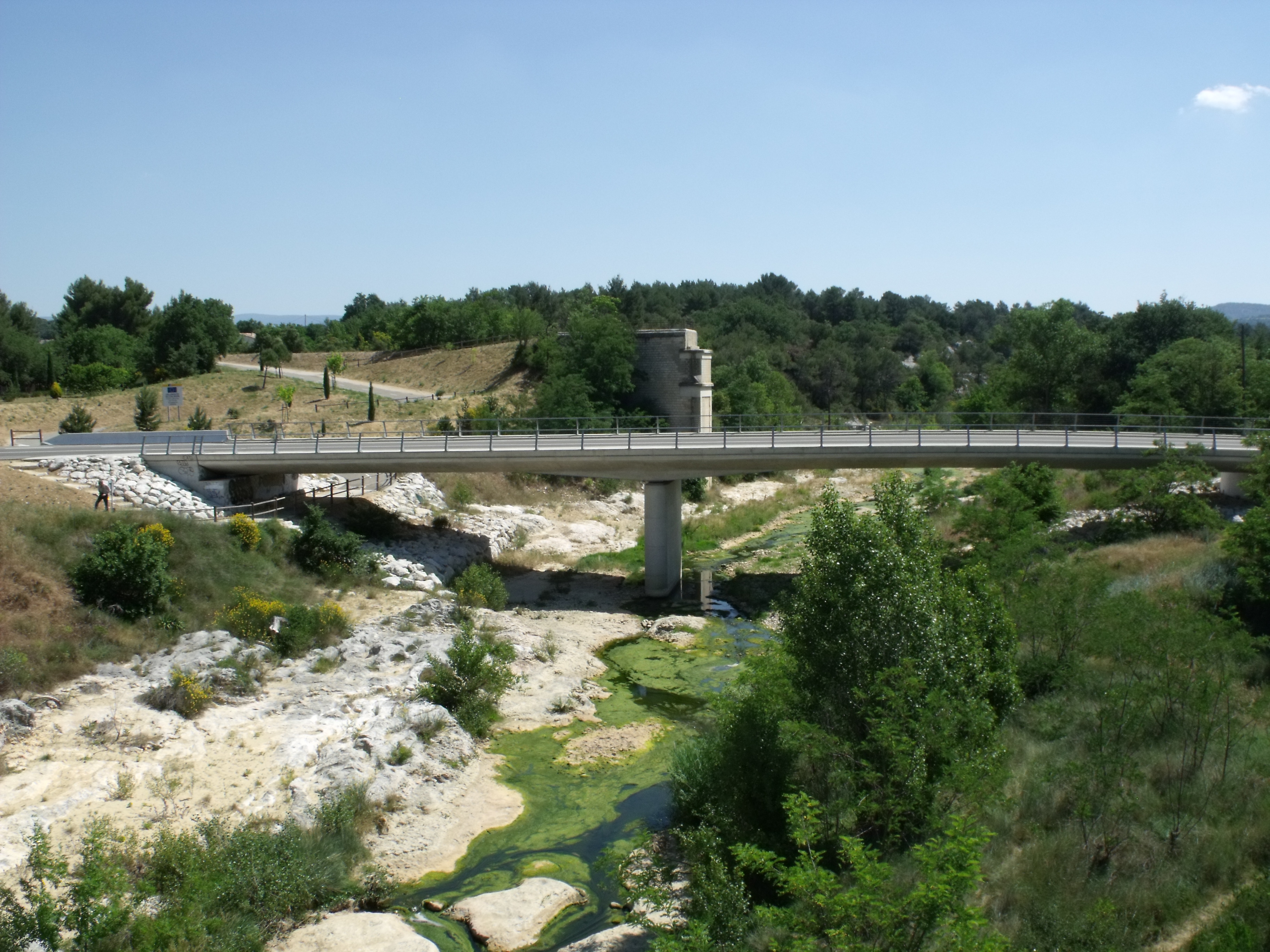
The modern bridge crossing the Cavalon upriver of the bridge

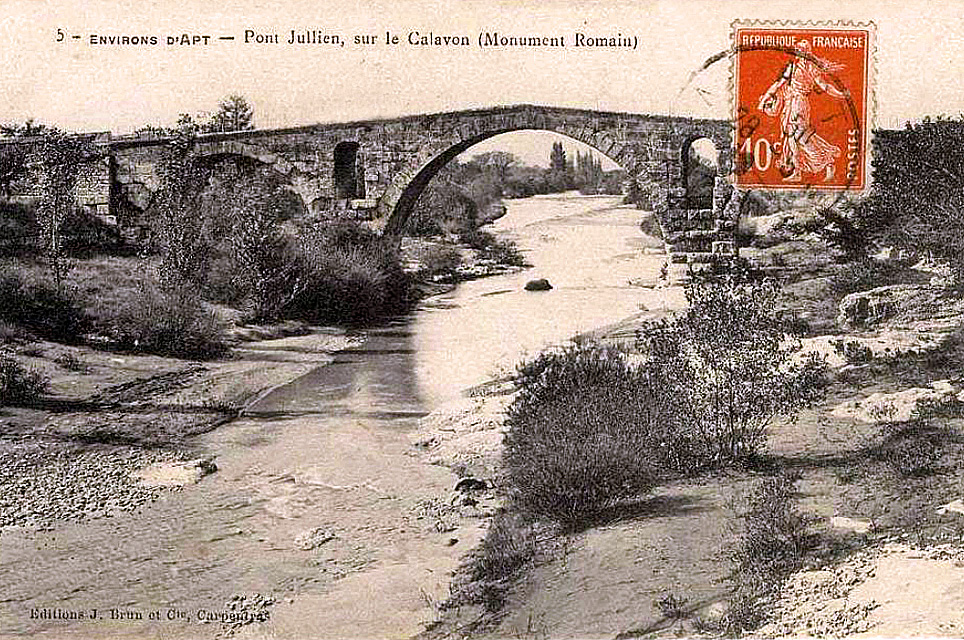
View of the bridge on an old postcard

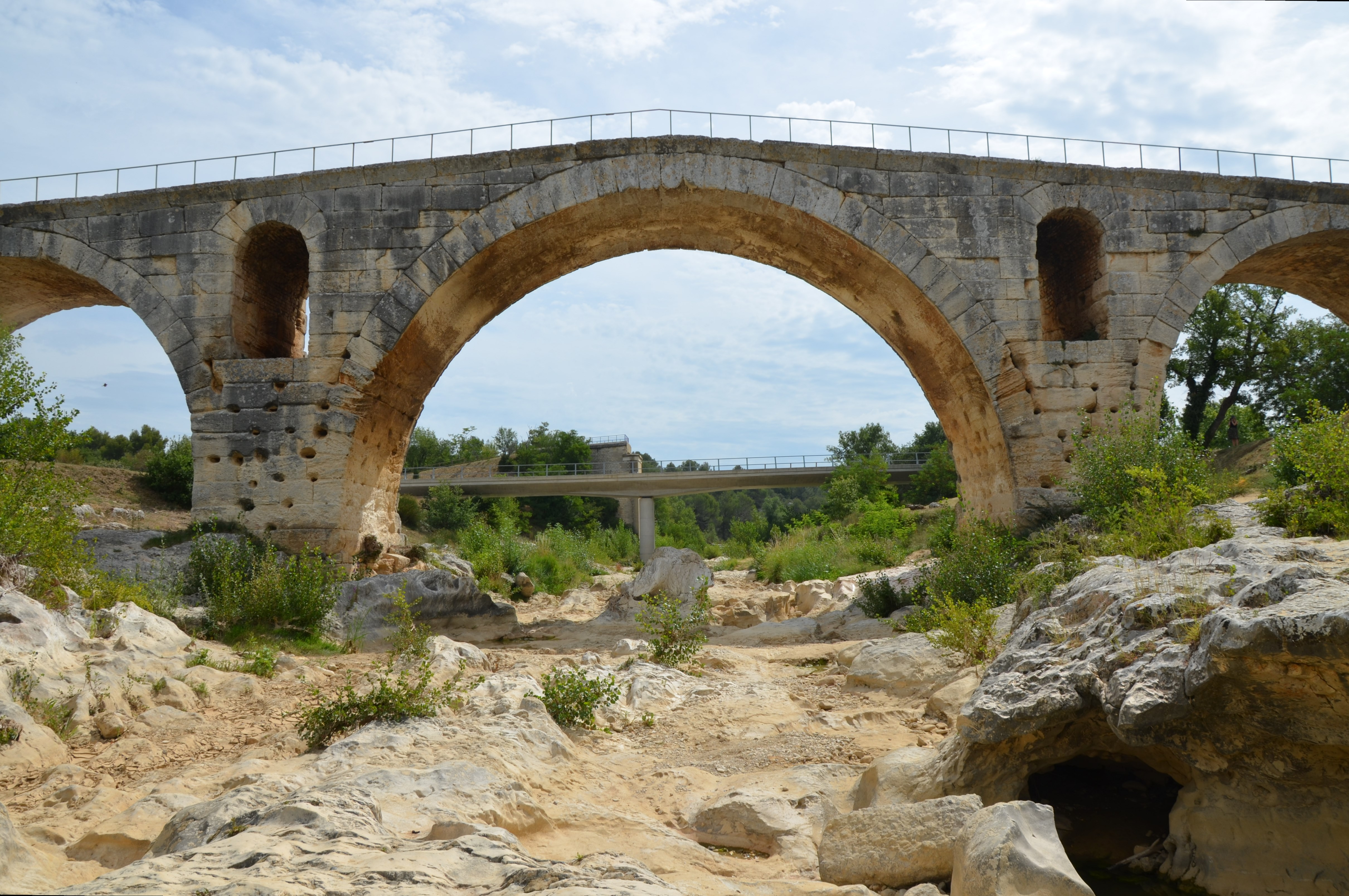
The dry riverbed of the Calavon and the main arch of the bridge

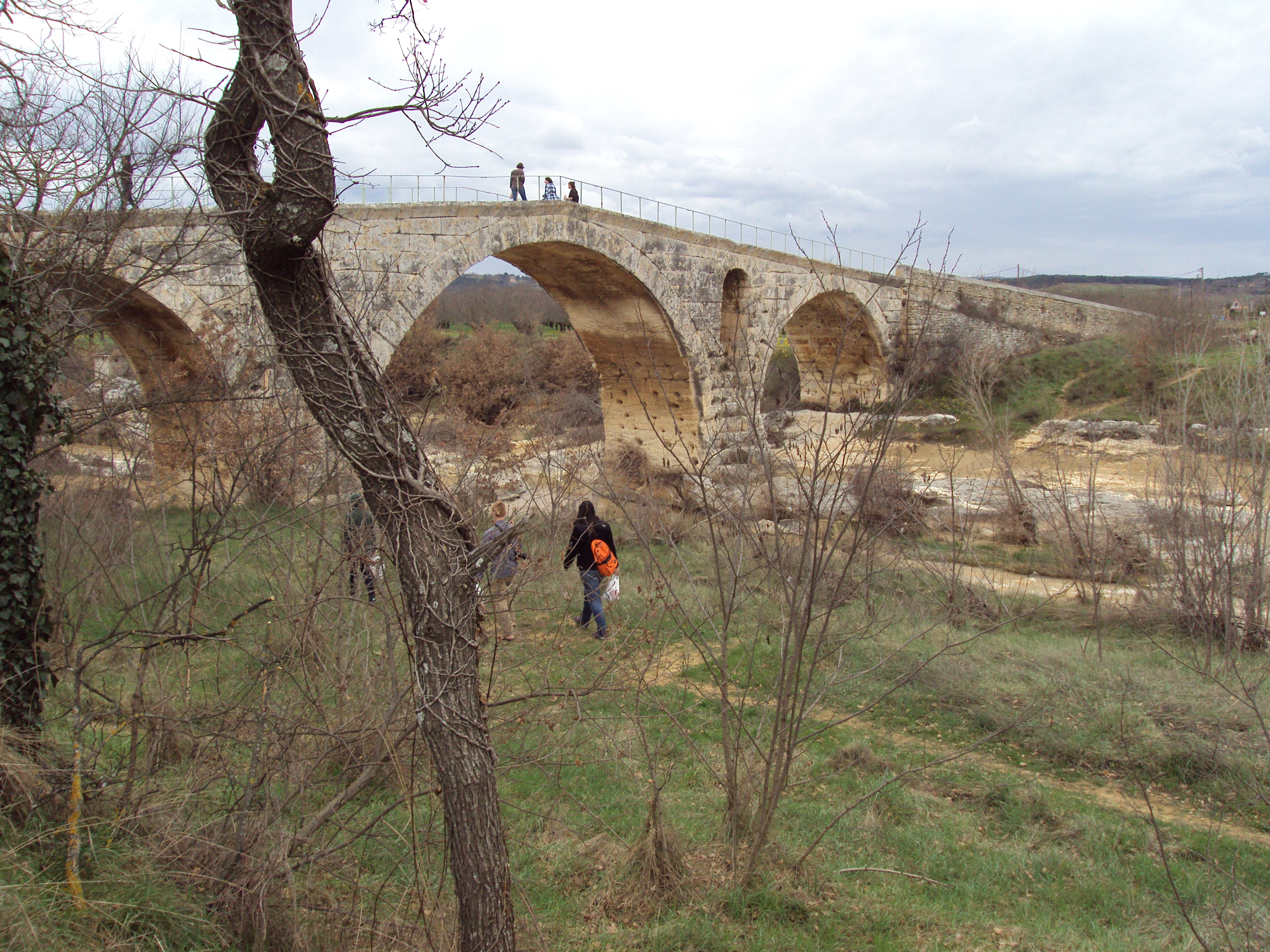
Pont Julien in March

== See also ==
- List of bridges in France
- List of Roman bridges
- Roman architecture
- Roman engineering
