= Bonnieux =

Bonnieux Bonius (Occitan)
- Commune
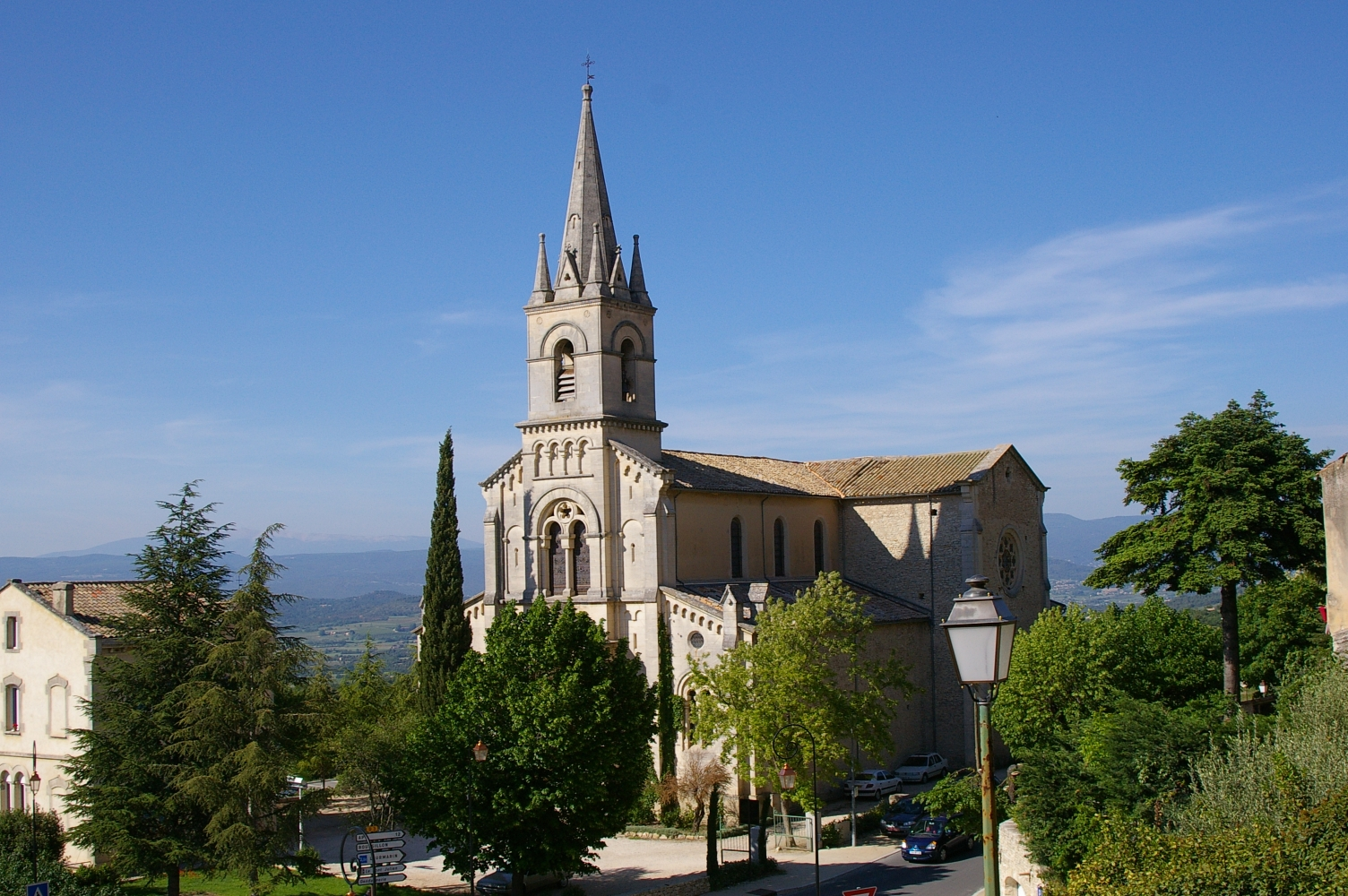
- The new church of Bonnieux

- Coat of arms
- Location of Bonnieux
- Location within France Location within Provence-Alpes-Côte d'Azur
- Coordinates: 43°49′26″N 5°18′27″E
- Country: France
- Region: Provence-Alpes-Côte d'Azur
- Department: Vaucluse
- Arrondissement: Apt
- Canton: Apt

Government
  - Mayor (2020–2026): Pascal Ragot
- Area^{1}: 51.12 km^{2} (19.74 sq mi)
- Elevation: 420 m (1,380 ft)
- Highest elevation: 715 m (2,346 ft)
- Lowest elevation: 153 m (502 ft)
- Population (2023): 1,198
  - Density: 23.44/km^{2} (60.70/sq mi)
- Time zone: UTC+01:00 (CET)
  - Summer (DST): UTC+02:00 (CEST)
- INSEE/Postal code: 84020 /84480
- ^{1} French Land Register data, which excludes lakes, ponds, glaciers > 1 km^{2} (0.386 sq mi or 247 acres) and river estuaries.

Bonnieux (French pronunciation: [bɔnjø]; Occitan: Bonius) is a commune in the Vaucluse department in the Provence-Alpes-Côte d'Azur region in Southeastern France. As of 2023, the population of the commune was 1,198. In the plain below the village stands the notable Roman bridge the Pont Julien.

== Geography ==
Bonnieux is one of the many historic "hill villages" in the region. Dating back to Roman times, it rests on top of the Luberon hills casting a watchful gaze across the rest of the valley. Next to the village is a cedar forest that began with trees imported from North Africa during the Napoleonic era. It sits opposite Mont Ventoux, other notable villages in the area include Ménerbes, Lacoste, Roussillon and Gordes.

The commune is traversed by the river Calavon.

== History ==
The region has been occupied since Neolithic times, with evidence scattered throughout the Luberon. Monuments dating from Roman times exist near the village including the Pont Julien built in 3 BC located only 3 miles to the north. A monastery was first built at that location in the 6th century, and walls were in place by the 10th century. The town reached a maximum population in the mid 19th century, with 2804 people in 1841. It has since declined to less than half its peak with 1363 in 2004.

== Culture ==
The 2006 Ridley Scott film A Good Year was filmed at Château La Canorgue in Bonnieux. In 2023, an episode of the Netflix television series Emily in Paris was filmed in Bonnieux.

Since 2025, Bonnieux has boasted three Michelin starred restaurants.

== See also ==
- Côtes du Luberon AOC
- Communes of the Vaucluse department
