= Villetelle =

- Commune
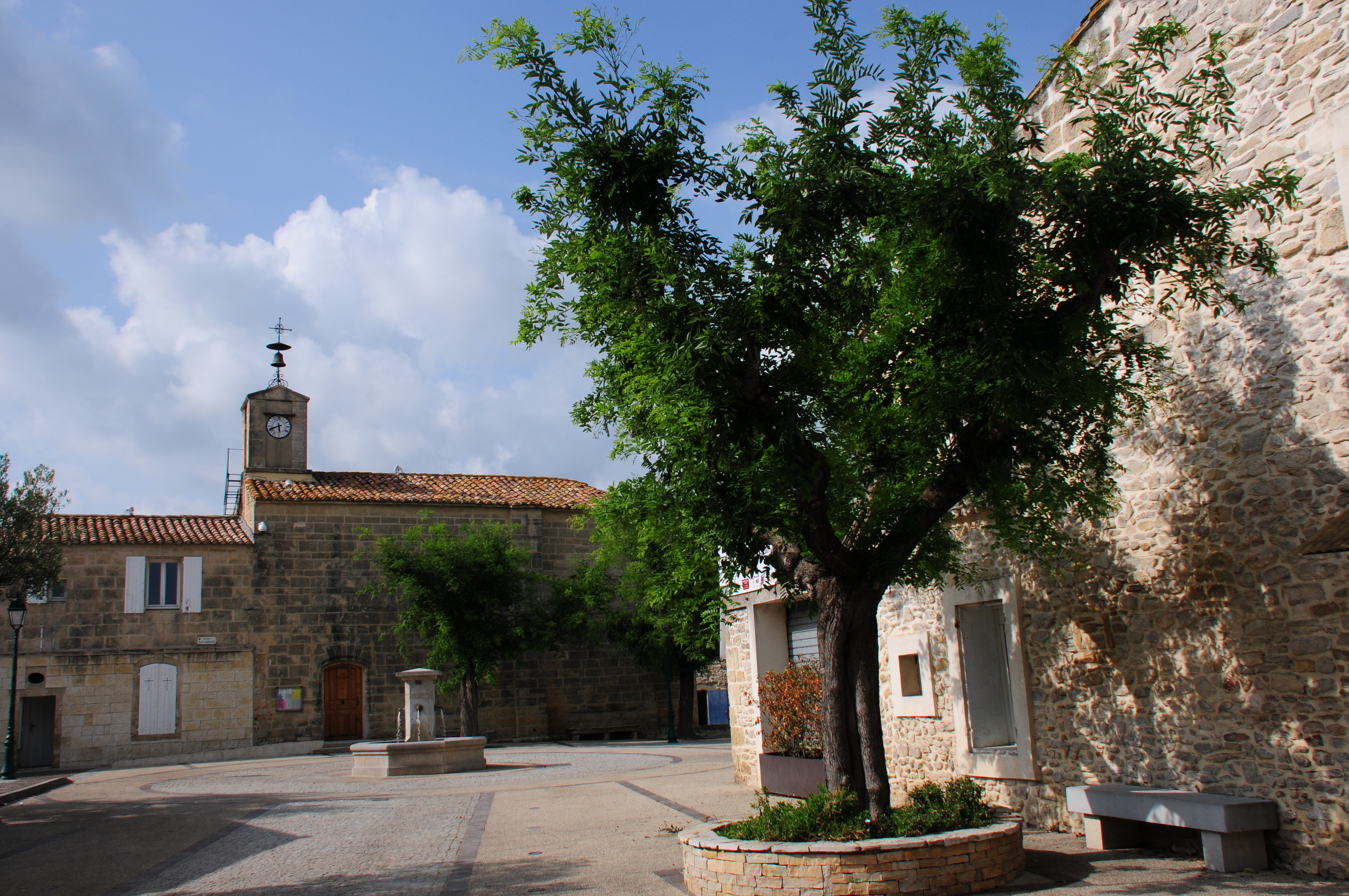
- Square. In the background on the left: the town hall, on its right the Saint Géraud church.

- Coat of arms
- Location of Villetelle
- Location within France Location within Occitanie
- Coordinates: 43°44′05″N 4°08′26″E
- Country: France
- Region: Occitania
- Department: Hérault
- Arrondissement: Montpellier
- Canton: Lunel
- Intercommunality: CA Lunel Agglo

Government
  - Mayor (2020–2026): Jean-Pierre Navas
- Area^{1}: 5.31 km^{2} (2.05 sq mi)
- Elevation: 37 m (121 ft)
- Highest elevation: 67 m (220 ft)
- Lowest elevation: 10 m (33 ft)
- Population (2023): 1,768
  - Density: 333/km^{2} (862/sq mi)
- Time zone: UTC+01:00 (CET)
  - Summer (DST): UTC+02:00 (CEST)
- INSEE/Postal code: 34340 /34400
- ^{1} French Land Register data, which excludes lakes, ponds, glaciers > 1 km^{2} (0.386 sq mi or 247 acres) and river estuaries.

Villetelle (French pronunciation: [viltɛl]; Occitan: Vilatèla) is a commune in the Hérault department in the Occitanie region in southern France.

== Geography ==
The river Vidourle, which is the boundary between the departments of Gard and Hérault, runs along the town.

== History ==
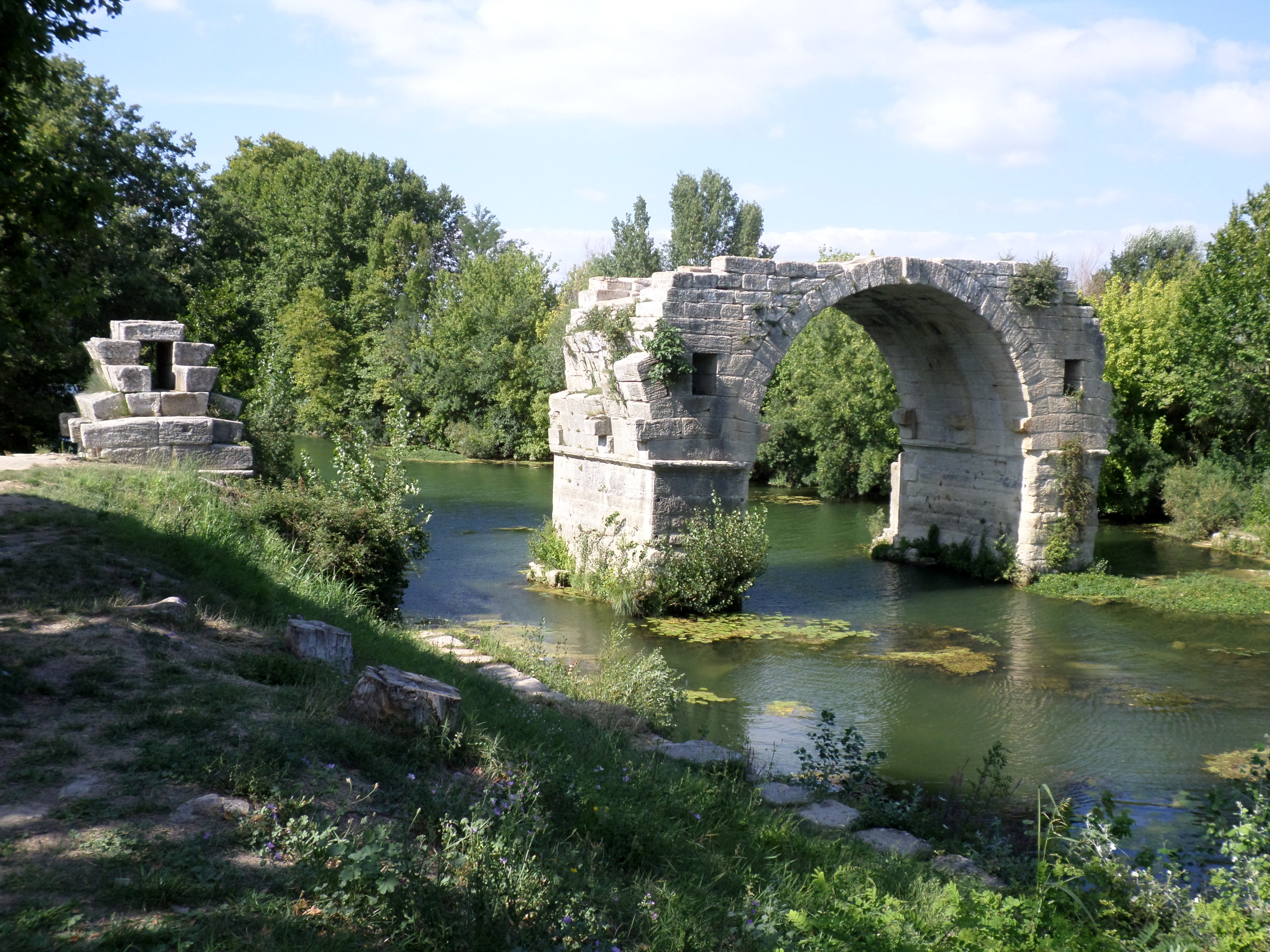
Pont Ambroix

The Gallo-Roman archaeological site of Ambrussum is located there.

== Administration ==
Election	Mayor	Party	Occupation
2001	Jean-Pierre Navas	DVG	Retiree

== Population ==
Historical population
Year	Pop.	±% p.a.
1968	154	—
1975	194	+3.35%
1982	248	+3.57%
1990	507	+9.35%
1999	923	+6.88%
2007	1,339	+4.76%
2012	1,448	+1.58%
2017	1,433	−0.21%
2023	1,768	+3.56%
Source: INSEE

== Pictures ==
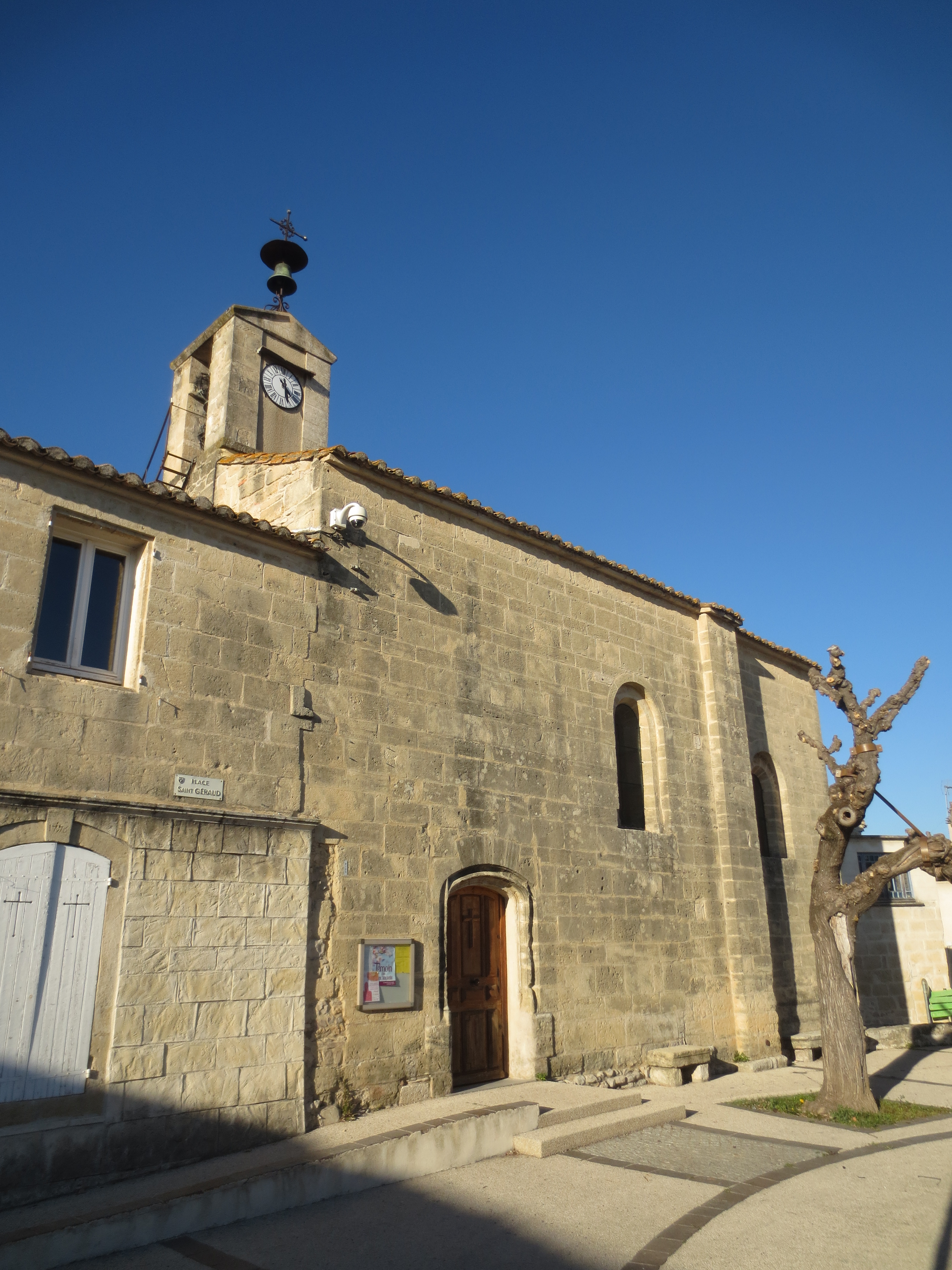
Saint Géraud church

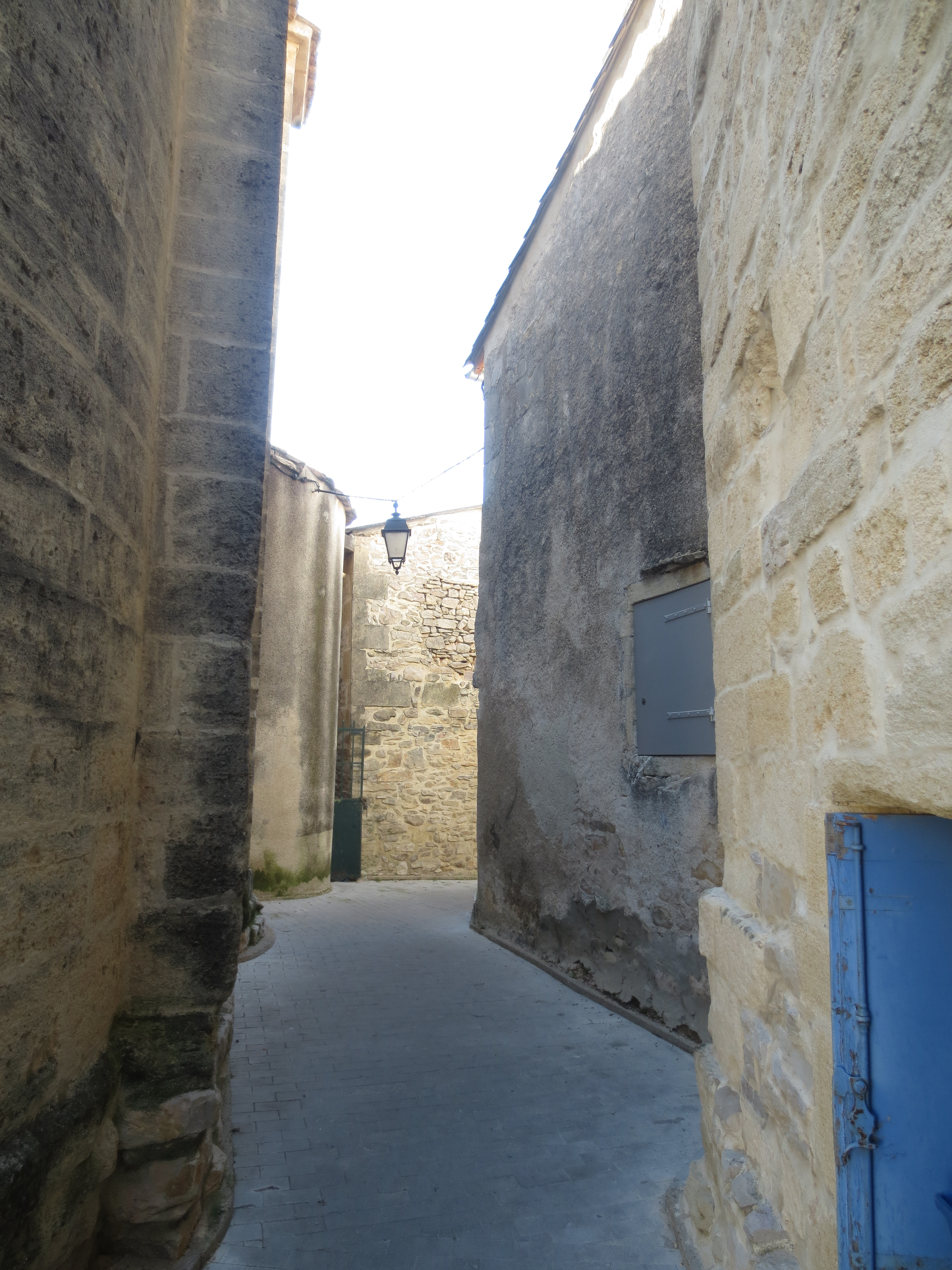
Alley behind the church

The porch from the church

The porch square

The old forge

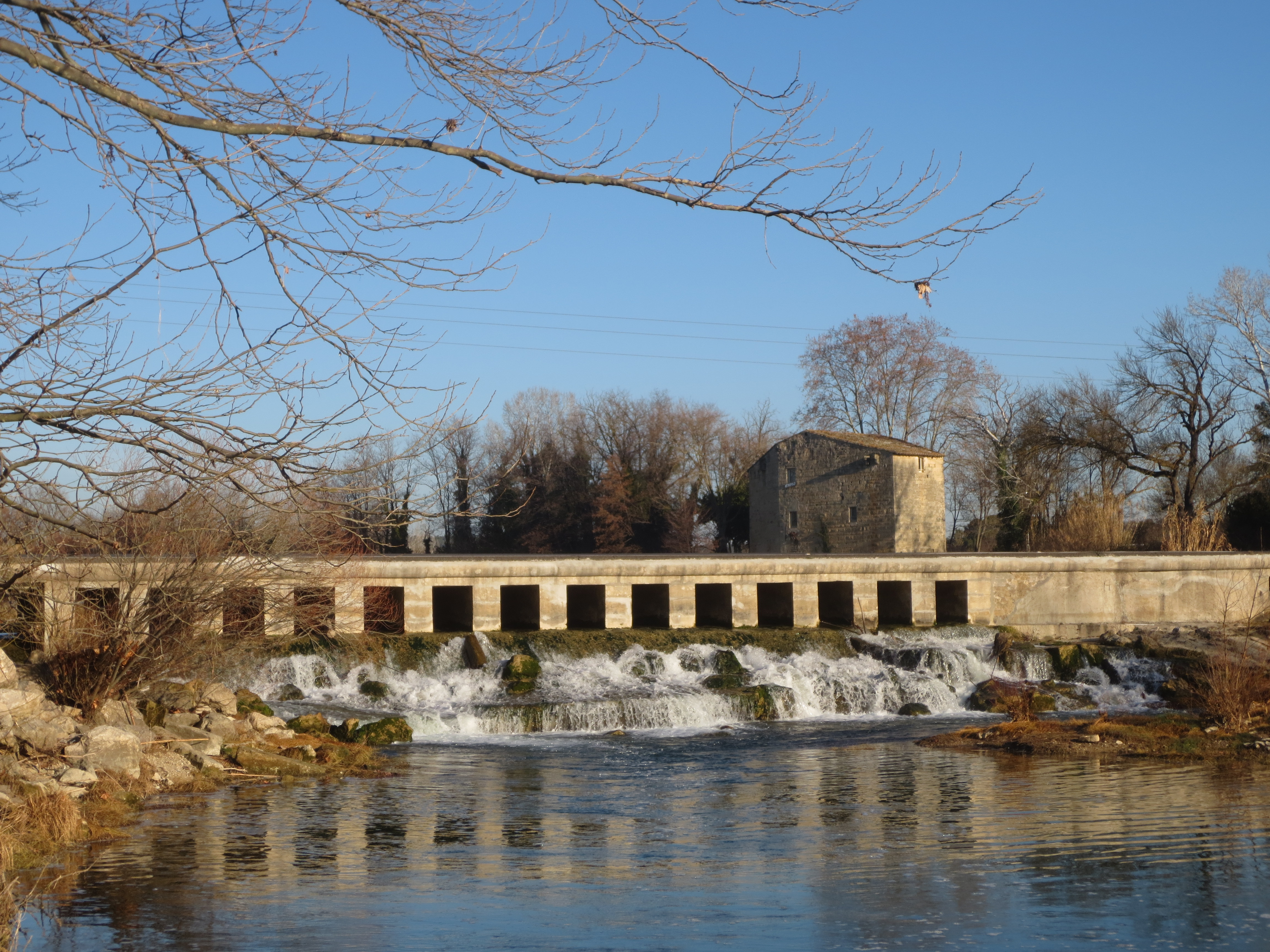
Vidourle river between Aubais and Villetelle

== See also ==
- Pont Ambroix
- Communes of the Hérault department
