= Aubais =

Commune in Occitanie, France

- Commune
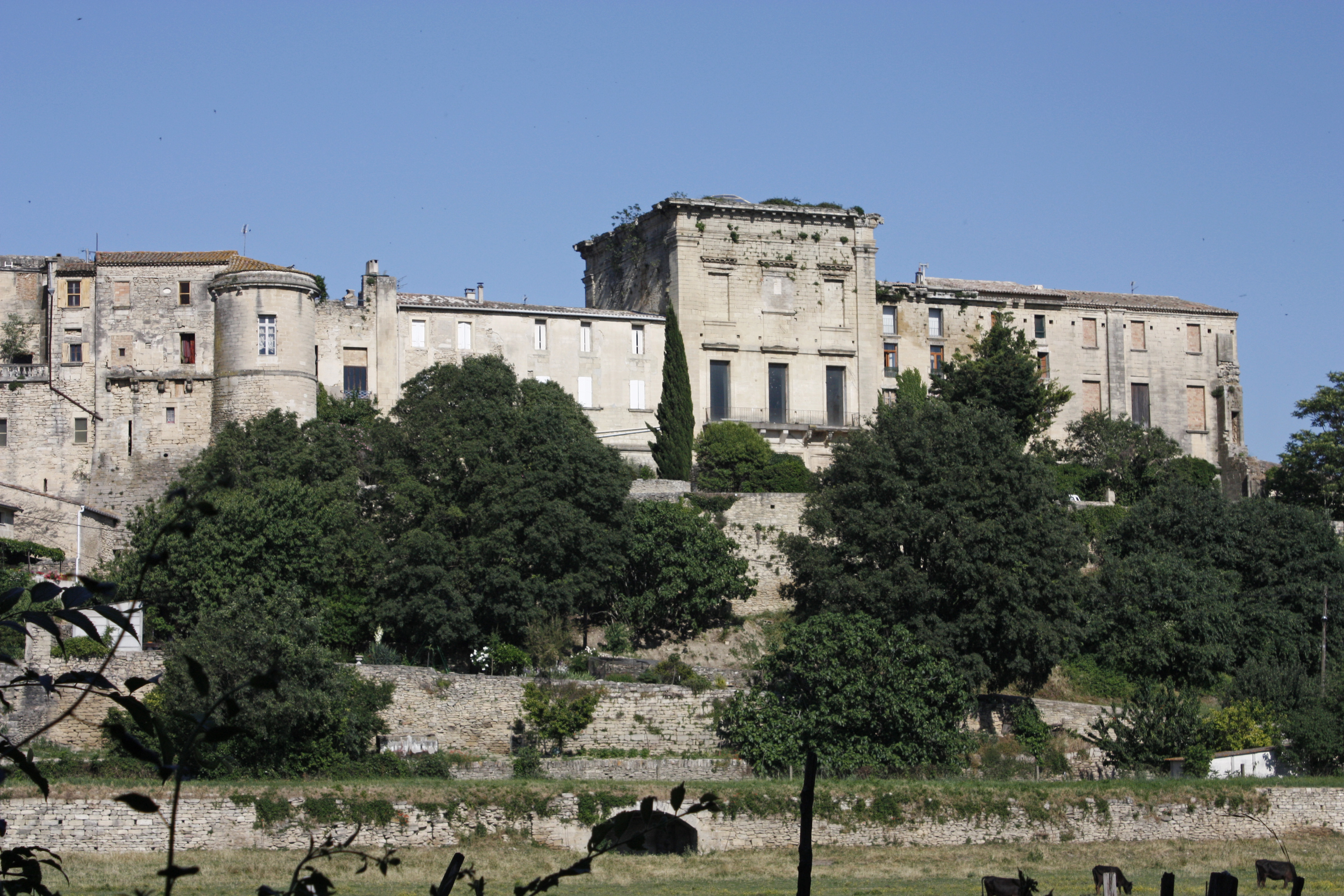
- Château d'Aubais

- Coat of arms
- Location of Aubais
- Location within France Location within Occitanie
- Coordinates: 43°45′21″N 4°08′55″E
- Country: France
- Region: Occitania
- Department: Gard
- Arrondissement: Nîmes
- Canton: Aigues-Mortes
- Intercommunality: CC Rhôny Vistre Vidourle

Government
  - Mayor (2020–2026): Angel Pobo
- Area^{1}: 11.79 km^{2} (4.55 sq mi)
- Elevation: 37 m (121 ft)
- Highest elevation: 95 m (312 ft)
- Lowest elevation: 12 m (39 ft)
- Population (2023): 2,925
  - Density: 248.1/km^{2} (642.6/sq mi)
- Time zone: UTC+01:00 (CET)
  - Summer (DST): UTC+02:00 (CEST)
- INSEE/Postal code: 30019 /30250
- ^{1} French Land Register data, which excludes lakes, ponds, glaciers > 1 km^{2} (0.386 sq mi or 247 acres) and river estuaries.

Aubais (French pronunciation: [obɛ]) is a commune in the Gard department in southern France.

The little town is in an about 20 km distance from Nîmes and Aigues-Mortes. The recreation area of La Grande-Motte is reachable also in a distance of about 20 km.

== History ==
Long before the Roman occupation, there are remnants of homes on the site Aubais, but virtually nothing, then, to approach the Middle Ages. The first time the specific word Albaisa (Alba, inspired by the white cliff on which the village is situated) is raised in 1096, marking the real beginning of the village's identity. It coincides with the construction of a watchtower followed some hundred years later by a castle and the erection of some houses at the site of the current Place des Halles.

In the 14th century Aubais had two high feudal square towers, the forerunner of the north wing of the present castle, around them were grouped a few houses. At the same time the Mill Quarry was built up on the banks of river Vidourle - today still on the territory of Aubais. Designed for milling grain, the visitor still finds the machicolations stones and bosses who remain. Beautifully restored today, it is an exhibition and leisure site and its water is the setting for a canoe-kayak club. The Chapel of St. Nazaire Massillargues parish in Aubais was also for the first time mentioned in the thirteenth century and still remains open for worship during special events.

In the 14th century and the following the village suffered like many other various scourges of pestilence, wars and robbery before being reborn in XVlth Century to a more normal activity.

In the 17th century Baron Louis de Baschi, from a Provençal family originating in Umbria, began building the central corps and the staircase of the castle, but because Protestant, suspended the work and left the country after the Revocation of the Edict of Nantes. His son, Charles Baschi, whose lands are located in Marquessate Aubais continued the construction of the Castle with its two wings, and enlarged the court of honor. Very degraded by the Revolution and over time the property of 19 different owners, the castle suffered from neglect. The lands of the Marquis of Aubais stretched far out of town, encompassing such Gavernes, Christin, Junas and others, and residents of Center Aubais stating they were AUBAIS MEMA (Aubais of same) . The term comes from being included on the signs entering the village.

== Population ==
Historical population
Year	Pop.	±% p.a.
1968	900	—
1975	1,016	+1.75%
1982	1,261	+3.13%
1990	1,541	+2.54%
1999	1,996	+2.92%
2007	2,314	+1.87%
2012	2,489	+1.47%
2017	2,762	+2.10%
2023	2,925	+0.96%
Source: INSEE

== Sights ==
Dominated by a castle from the Renaissance and Baroque period the medieval town is situated on a ridge and offers from some places a view over the vineyards and hills of the area up to the river Vidourle. Nearby are the excavations of the Gallo-Roman oppidum Ambrussum with a single arch of a Roman bridge over the river Vidourle which was painted by the French painter Gustave Courbet when he hiked at that time the Languedoc. Courbet's former route can today be hiked on the official trail Route Courbet.

Cave Aubaï Mema is home to the village's organic wines and doubles as a restaurant as well as a venue for private events and tango nights.

== People ==
René Grousset was born in Aubais on 5 September 1885, and died on 12 September 1952 in Paris. He was a historian, curator of both the Cernuschi- and Guimet-Museums in Paris, and a member of the prestigious Académie française (French Academy).

The painter Claude Viallat was born in Nîmes in 1936 and grew up in Aubais.

== Today ==
Major efforts have been made in equipment or social associations. The comprehensive Socio-Educational Center of the village includes a theatre and many rooms for judo, binding, dance and further cultural activities.

Major rehabilitation operations were carried out recently by efforts of "Building Insertion" on buildings or sites aubaisiens, including the Old Mill Quarry, Halls vaulted Castle, and more recently Chapel St. Nazaire. Searches of the immediate area have helped to update the foundations and the remains of a cemetery of the eleventh century.

== See also ==
- Communes of the Gard department
