= Ambrussum =

Historic site in Villetelle, Occitania, France

Ambrussum Oppidum, Pont Ambroix, Mutatio
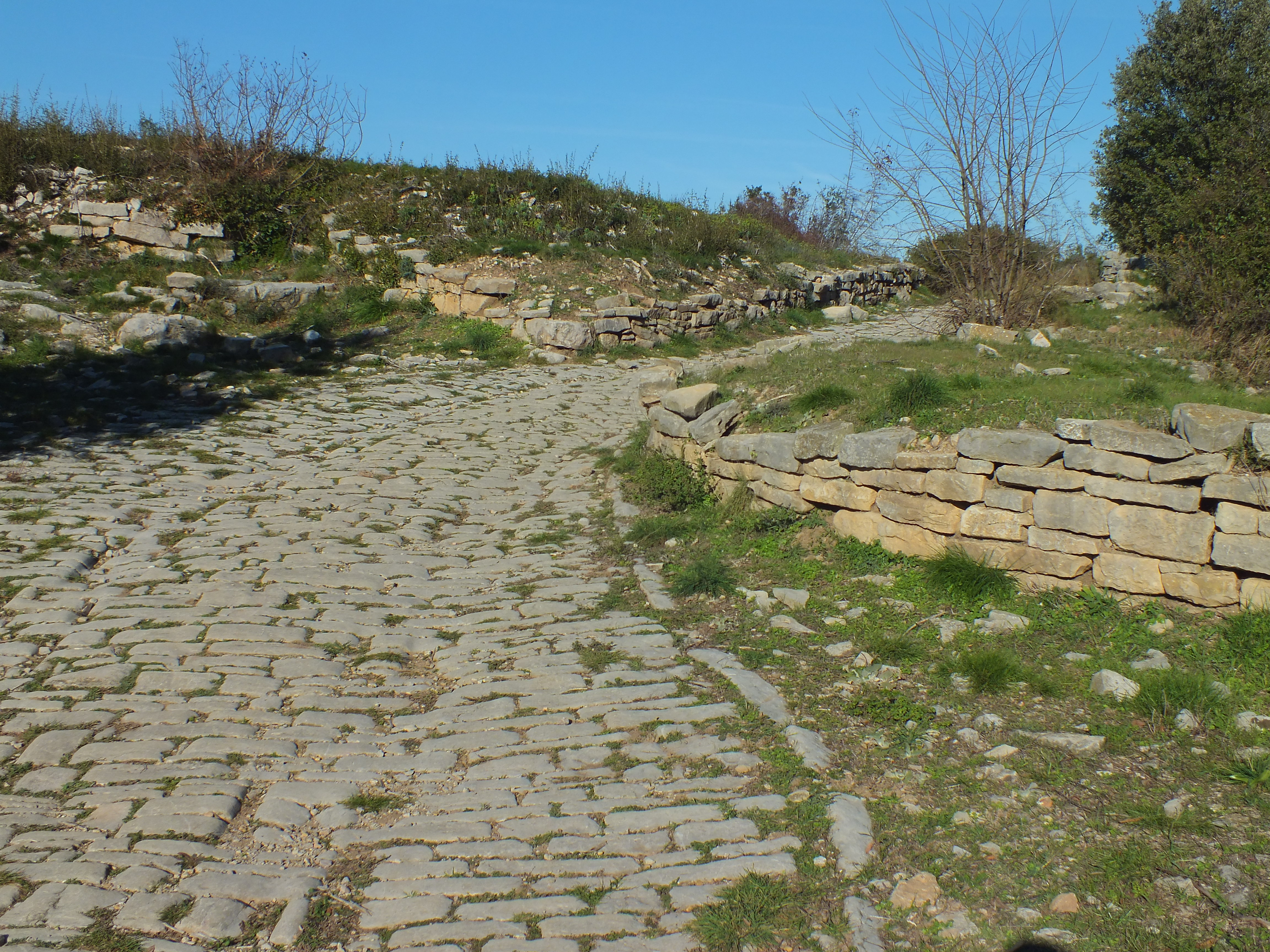
- The paved road in the oppidum at the south gate leading from the Via Domitia, Ambrussum.

- Location within France
- 43°43′09″N 04°08′53″E
- Location: Ambrussum; 34400 Villetelle

History
- Built: 4th century BC – 2nd century AD

Monument historique
- Official name: Oppidum d'Ambrussum
- Type: Cultural Base Mérimée
- Designated: 1974
- Reference no.: PA00103760
- France
- Region: Europe and North America

Monument historique
- Official name: Pont Ambroix
- Type: Cultural Base Mérimée
- Designated: 1840
- Reference no.: PA00103057

Ambrussum (French pronunciation: [ɑ̃bʁysɔm], [ɑ̃bʁysœm]; Latin pronunciation: [amˈbrussum]) is a Roman archaeological site in Villetelle, Occitania, Southern France.

It is close to the modern town Lunel, between Nîmes and Montpellier. Ambrussum is notable for its museum, its staging post on the Via Domitia, its bridge Pont Ambroix over the Vidourle, painted by Gustave Courbet, and for its oppidum (fortified village). Its history of settlement spanned 400 years.

The whole site is still being excavated. A lower settlement prone to flooding was a staging post for travellers on the Via Domitia and provided stabling and accommodation and the full range of repair facilities that were needed by carts and the Imperial postal service. The higher settlement was based on a pre-Roman oppidum which was within a surrounding wall including 21 towers. The Romans re-modelled the oppidum, so there is evidence of a complete range of housing styles from the earliest one room dwellings to sophisticated courtyard houses on the second century AD.

The Roman road, the Via Domitia, ran at the foot of the settlement, leading from it is a paved road with visible with traces of Roman chariot tracks. The Roman bridge was used until the Middle Ages but fell into disrepair, and only one complete arch remains.

== Location ==
Ambrussum, or its alternative spelling of Ambrusium, is mentioned as a staging post (mutatio) on the Antonine Itinerary of AD 200, on pilgrims' guide on the route to the Holy Land of AD 333 and on the Peutinger map of 1520. All place it midway between Nimes (Nemausis) and Castelnau-le-Lez (Sextantio), about 22 kilometres (14 mi) from each.

The Via Domitia linked the Alps with the Pyrenees, and is the oldest Roman Road in Gaul, more specifically Gallia Narbonensis in France. Laid out by Cneius Domitius Ahenobarbus around 120 BC, it was to become part of the roads that linked Italy with Cádiz in Spain. At Ambussum the Via Domitia crosses the Vidourle, and the settlement provided a staging post on this road. Directly adjacent to the site, the modern A9 autoroute, the Languedocienne crosses the Vidourle and at this point there is the modern day equivalent of a mutatio, the Aire de service de Lunel. The site is reached through the village of Villetelle.

The bridge is 20 m above sea level, and the highest point of the oppidum is 58 m. When in spate the Vidourle will rise by 8 m. From the highest point, the Oppidum de Nages is easily seen. Further one can see Mont Ventoux, Pic Saint-Loup, and the hills of the Cevennes including the Causse du Larzac and Mont Aigoual.

== History ==
The site was first settled in 2,300 BC and the construction started on the oppidum around 300 BC. It was a settlement of Gauls. The Romans conquered the area in 120 BC. The paved road at the heart of the oppidum was laid around 100 BC. Between the oppidum and the river was a staging post (mutatio) on the Via Domitia. That, and the Pont Ambroix were constructed in around 30 BC. The flow patterns of the river changed around 10 BC; it became more aggressive and flooding became more frequent. The large houses on the south of the oppidum were built in AD 50. The whole oppidum was abandoned in AD 100, but parts of the lower settlement were still in use in AD 400, and the Pont Ambroix continued in use throughout the Middle Ages. It took a battering from the Vidourlades, or violent floods or spates on the Vidourle. During a spate, the water flow increases from a minimum of 3 m^{3}/s to over 3000 m^{3}/s. Floods were recorded on 8 October 1723. The floods of 18 November 1745 reduced the bridge from four arches to three. Further major floods occurred on 6 October 1812, 21 October 1891, and 21 September 1907. The floods of 7 September 1933 reduced the bridge from two arches to the one we see today. The site was abandoned when transit patterns changed, the Domitia became less important and the community relocated to Lunel-Viel, which better served a north–south transit. The site was returned to its natural state, and later to the cultivation of vines and olives. This protected the archaeological record.

== Site ==
Ambrussum contains three archaeological sites of international importance: the Colline de Devès which was first occupied in 2300 BC and settled as an oppidum between 300 BC and 100 AD; the Roman staging post on the Via Domitia which had hotels, a baths and industrial buildings; the Roman bridge, the Pont Ambroix.

The bridge is a Mérimée list National Monument No. PA00103057. The oppidum is a Mérimée list National Monument No. PA00103760

=== Oppidum ===
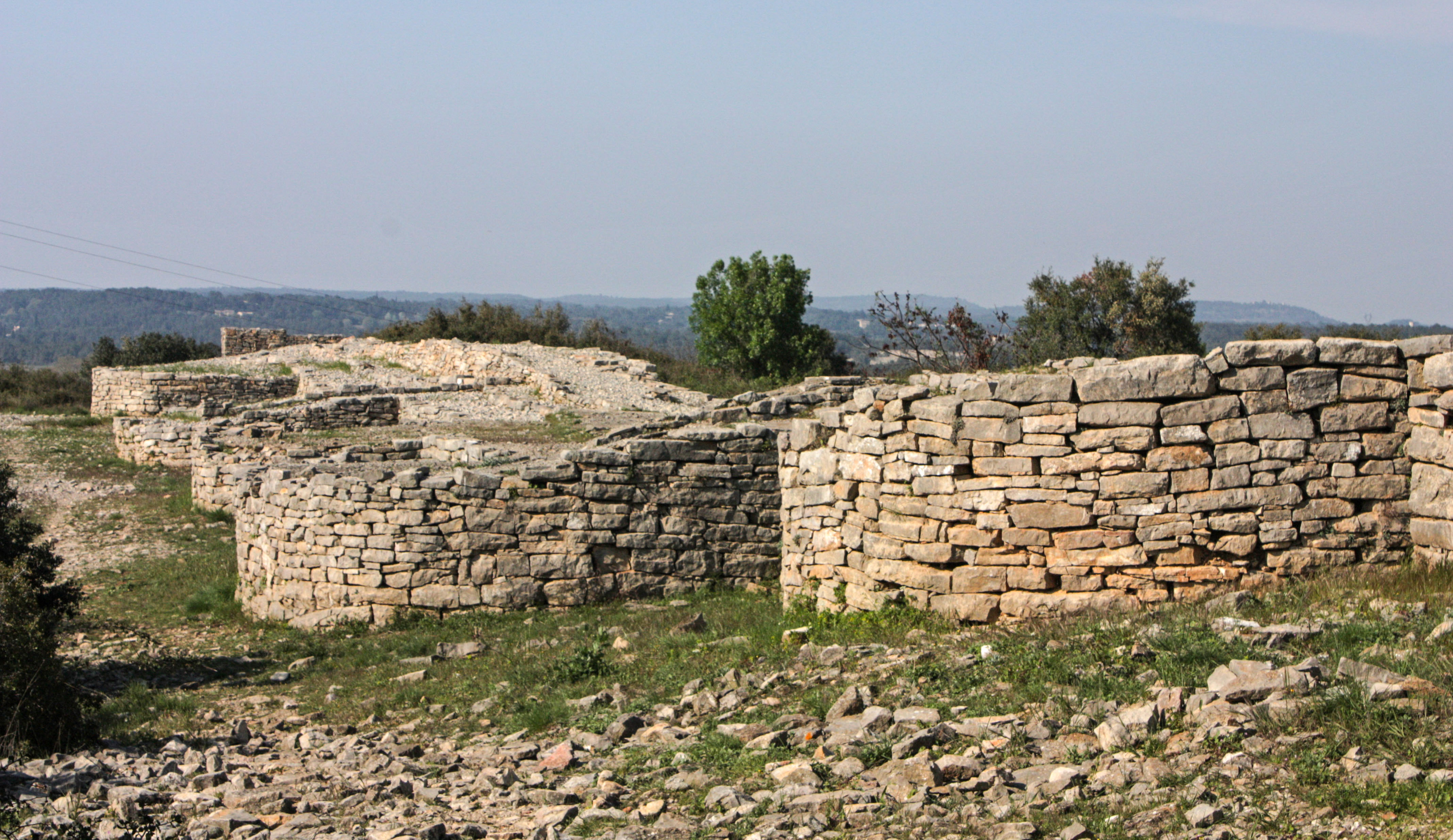
The ramparts

Originally the Oppidum was the work of the Volcae Arecomici who started it in the fourth century BC. Nine square houses from the earliest period were recorded by Émile Marignan, these were roofed with branches and reeds. A rectangular house from the third century has been excavated. This contained both rough earthenware pottery for cooking and a finer black glazed table ware. During the first century BC, the hill was terraced and the houses became narrower similar to those found at Nages.

The hill was fortified in the late fourth century BC, the ramparts enclosed an area of 5.6 hectares (14 acres). It was triangular in form but most of the eastern section was looted to be used in lime kilns. It consisted of a 7.5-metre (25 ft) dry limestone wall. There were three gateways, one to the north, south and east. The 635-metre (694 yd) western section of the wall, cleared in 1974, revealed 24 bastions. These were originally rectangular but were replaced in the mid-third century BC with rounded ones. Two of the towers were substantially higher; these were built as watch towers and for prestige. The ramparts were abandoned in the first century AD.

After the Romans settled the area in 120 BC the hill was redeveloped, the residential areas were reorganised, and the road through the settlement from the east gate to the south gate was paved. The south gate was enlarged and a large square was cleared behind with a civil basilica, stones of which made their way in the second century AD to the staging post. The Via Domitia would have passed around the hill, but it has been speculated that it passed along this narrow road. The route of the Via often passes along roads with the name 'Route de la Monnaie', but as this originates from a translation of 'raised road' it merely shows that the road was using Roman construction techniques rather than that it formed part of the Via Domitia. The south gate does lead to a 'Route de la Monnaie', but the paved road in the oppidum has a gradient of 9% and is too narrow for carts to pass, although it would have been suitable for important visitors. The paved road at the east gate leads towards the bridge, but stops abruptly at a steep bank. It is thought that the river has undercut the bank at this point and removed all traces of the road.

The north of the post-conquest oppidum is densely populated, but the houses there were of the domus style found throughout the Empire - courtyard dwellings where the slaves lived closest to the entrance and the family in the building opposite. To the south are some large 400-square-metre (4,300 sq ft) courtyard homes built around AD 50.

The whole oppidum was abandoned in AD 100.

=== Staging post ===
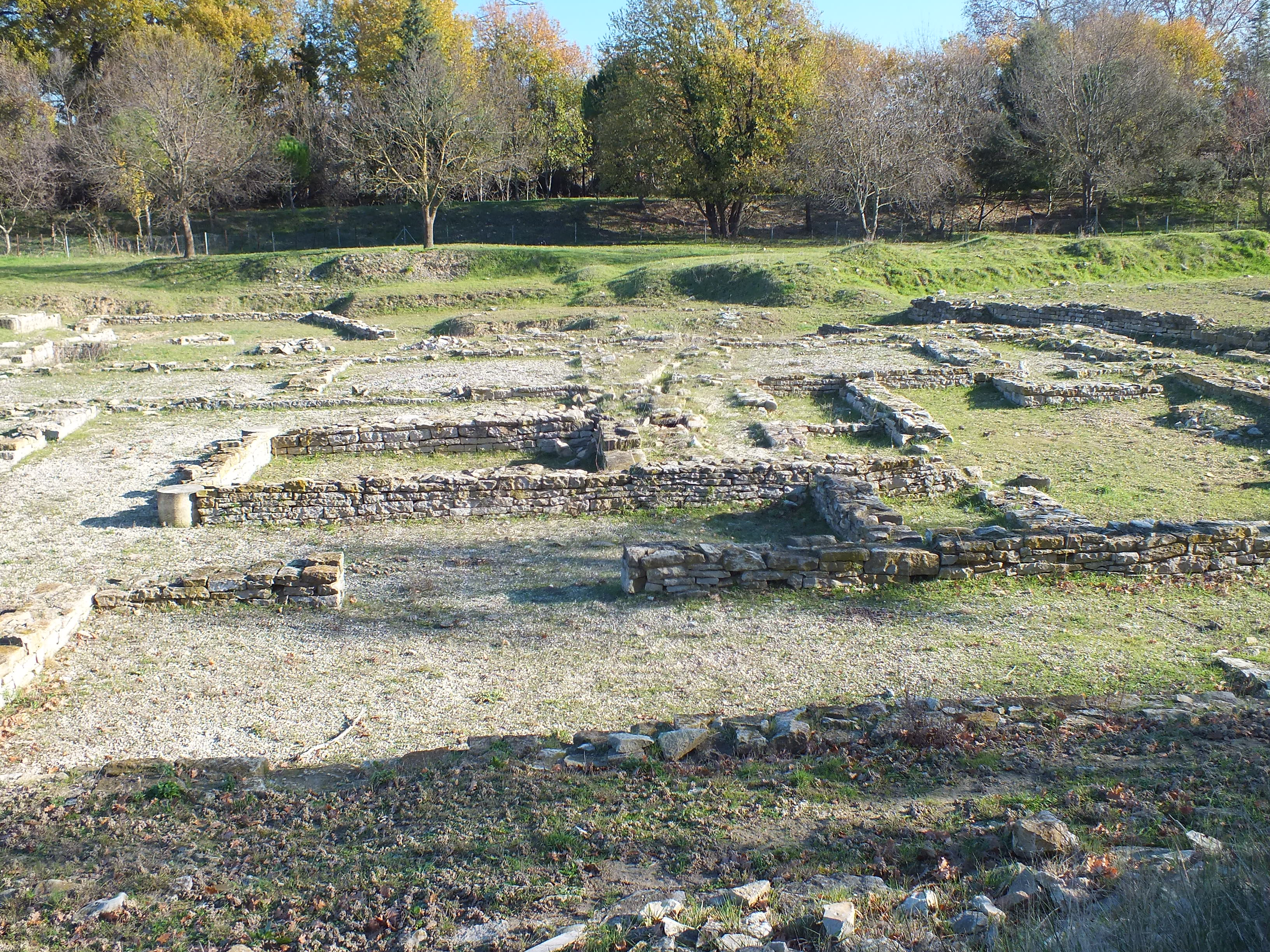
Taverns and Hotels to the south of the mutatio.

The existence of a staging post for the Imperial mail is known of from written sources, and also that it was located by the Vidourle and as a consequence was continually being rebuilt. An embankment was built to protect the settlement from flooding. The Imperial staging post itself was a complex containing two courtyards and two buildings. In the south gallery, the walls were decorated with paintings and a purse containing 43 denarii has also been found there. This building would have been for Imperial messengers and travelling officials. It was renovated and possibly changed its use in the fourth century AD, at a time when the rest of the site had been abandoned. A separate inn has been excavated. It contained a courtyard for the animals and carts and five guest rooms. Adjacent was a building with a bread oven. The inn remained substantially unchanged from 30 BC to AD 125. Nearby, and closer to the water were two further inns, parts of which date from AD 200 to 250. The settlement was substantial enough to have a bathhouse. Although most of it is now beneath a modern road, the heater chamber remains. The praefurnia took the heated air to the underfloor heating, hot water to the calidarium and steam to the laconicum. There was also a blacksmith's courtyard house with a forge specialising in carriage building. This dates from AD 25 to 175. Excavations are still continuing; the land is privately owned and not accessible to the public.

=== Pont Ambroix ===
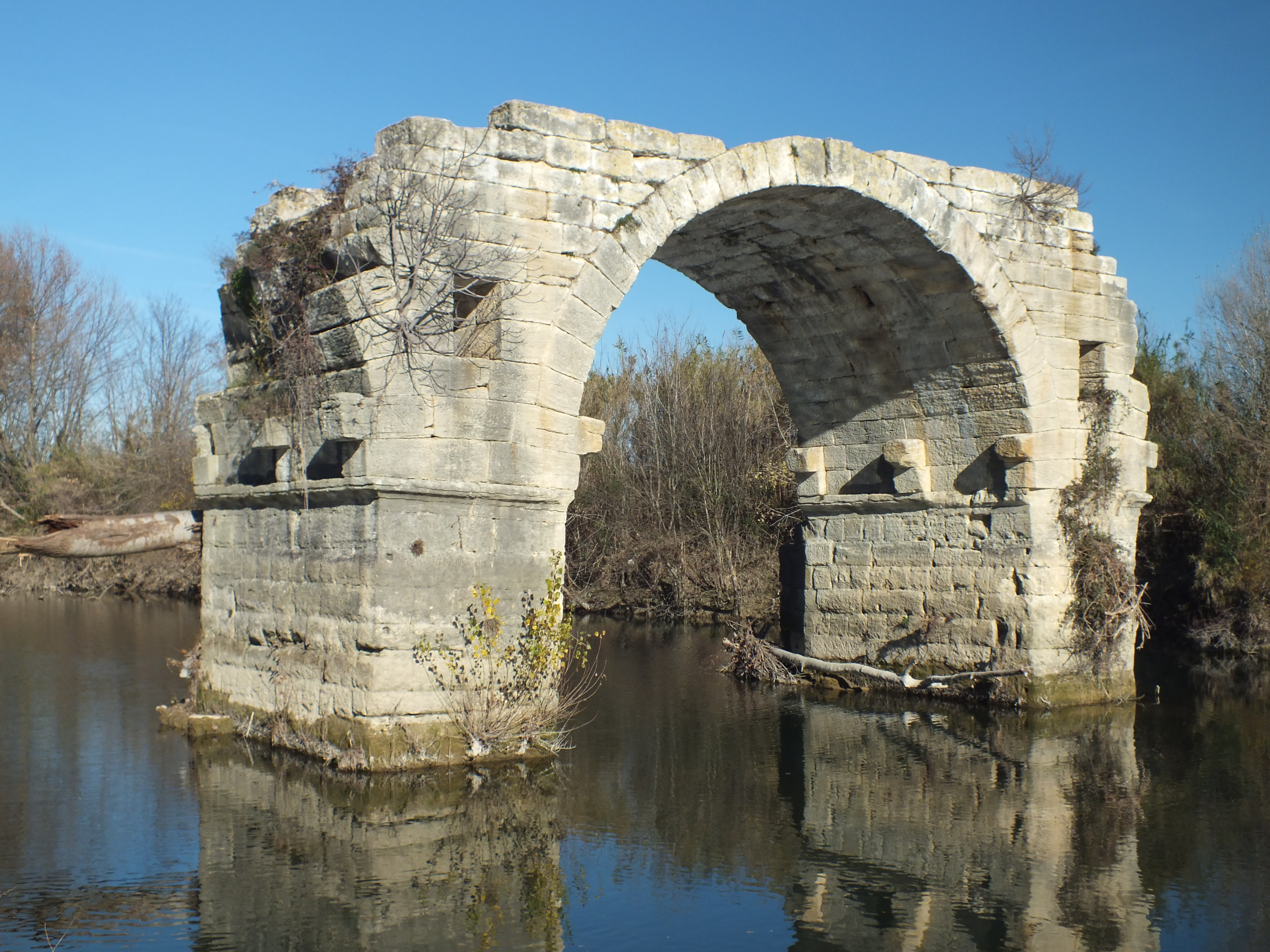
The remaining arch of the Pont Ambroix.

The bridge was built across the Vidourle River with 11 arches. It was still usable in the Middle Ages, with all 11 arches intact, but a sketch by Anne Rulman in 1620 shows only four and then when painted by Gustave Courbet in 1857 only two arches were left. One of those was lost in the flooding of 1933, so only a single arch remains.

== Excavation ==
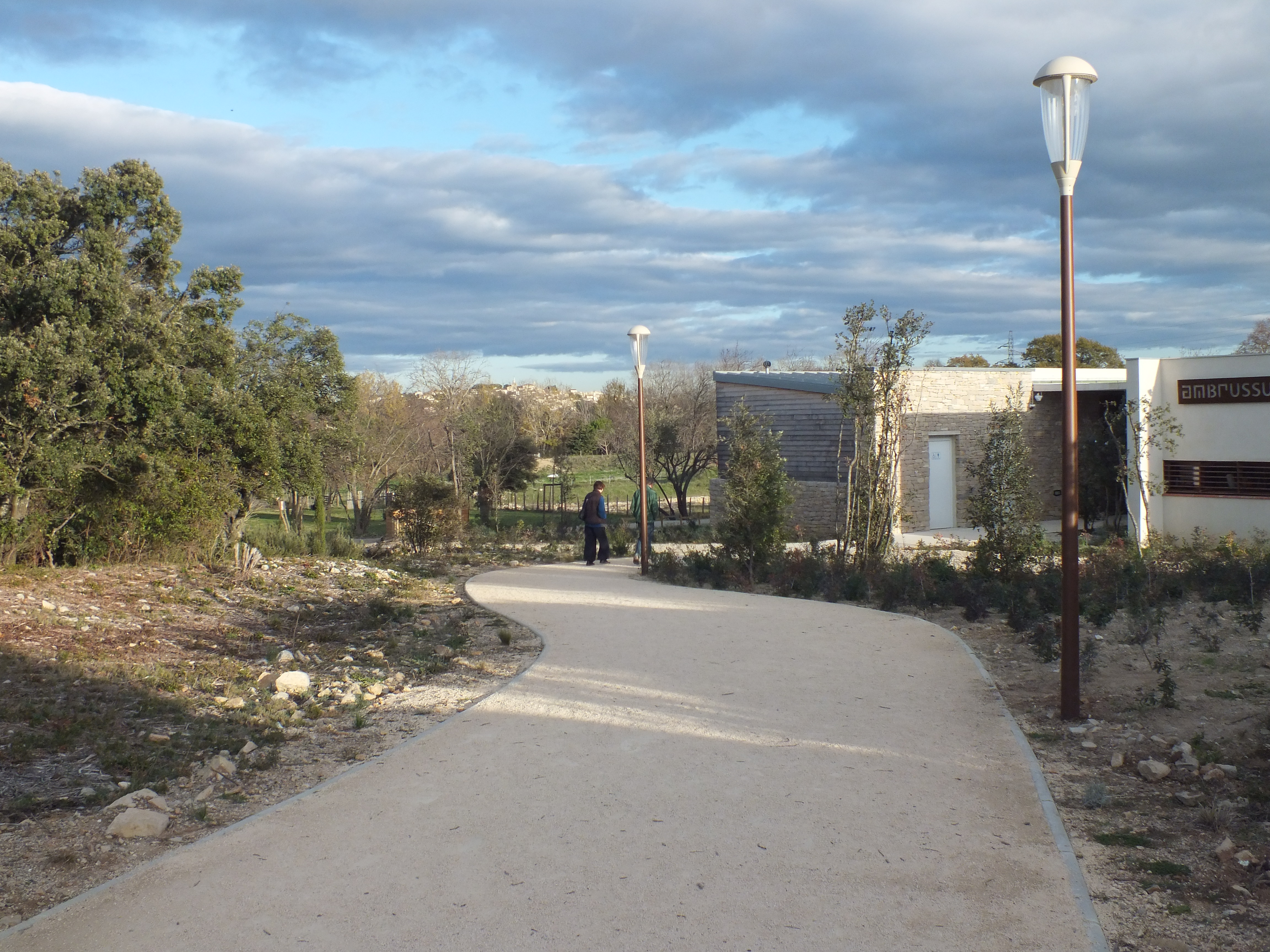
The Visitors' Centre designed by Michel Goroneskoul opened on 25 June 2011.

The antiquity of the Pont Ambroix had never been disputed and it had been visited by Mérimée, who included it in the first edition of his Historical Monuments of France in 1840. The adjacent hill, the Colline de Devès, was not investigated until the 1960s however. In 1964 Marc Fenouillet did a surface inspection in the vineyard at the base of the hill and found Roman era remains. In November 1967, the first archaeological test digging was begun on the hill itself by Jean-Luc Fiches and traces of the oppidum were found; a larger, volunteer dig was made the following July. In 1974, a path had been cleared around the ramparts and the oppidum was recognised and classified as an historic monument. A regular pattern of annual digs was established. The paved road was discovered in 1975. Between 1980 and 1985 further excavations established that the lower site, adjacent to the bridge, was a staging post on the Via Domitia. In 1984 the hill was donated to authorities in Lunel but the lower site remains in private ownership. There was a pause in the excavations between 1986 and 1992. Subsequently, the lower site became the focus of attention, along with the contours of the river. In 2009 the community of Lunel began the construction of a visitor centre and museum, although work was interrupted in May 2011 by an accidental fire that set the vegetation alight. Four water-carrying aircraft Canadairs were called in to help the firefighters sapeur-pompiers extinguish the fire. Fortuitously, the fire revealed more features of the oppidum. The museum designed by Michel Goroneskoul opened on 25 June 2011.

== See also ==
- Oppidum de Nages
