= Saint-Laurent-d'Aigouze station =

Railway station in Saint-Laurent-d'Aigouze, France

Saint-Laurent-d'Aigouze

General information
- Location: Saint-Laurent-d'Aigouze, Occitanie, France
- Coordinates: 43.63925°N 4.19305°E
- Line: Saint-Césaire–Le Grau-du-Roi railway

Other information
- Station code: 87775841

Services
Preceding station	TER Occitanie	Following station
Aimargues towards Nîmes	26	Aigues-Mortes towards Le Grau-du-Roi
Location

Saint-Laurent-d'Aigouze is a railway station in Saint-Laurent-d'Aigouze, Occitanie, southern France. Within TER Occitanie, it is part of line 26 (Nîmes-Le Grau-du-Roi).
