= Pont Ambroix =

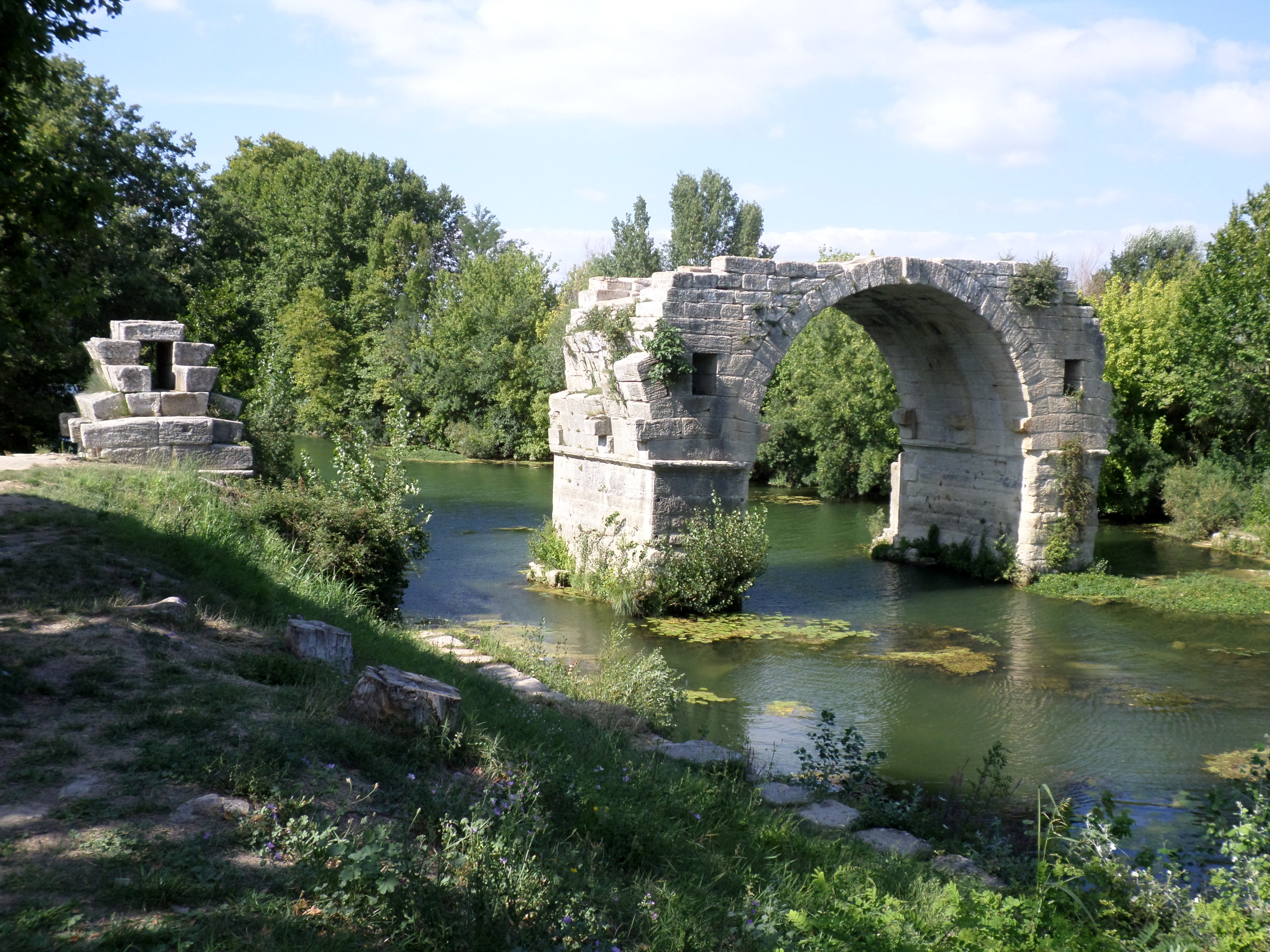
- Remaining arch of the Pont Ambroix
- Coordinates: 43.7172°N 4.1519°E
- Carries: Via Domitia
- Crosses: Vidourle
- Locale: Ambrussum, Languedoc-Roussillon, France

Characteristics
- Design: Arch bridge
- Material: Stone

History
- Construction end: 1st century BC

Location
- Interactive map of Pont Ambroix

The Pont Ambroix or Pont d'Ambrussum (French for Ambrussum Bridge) was a 1st-century BC Roman bridge in the south of France that was part of the Via Domitia. It crossed the Vidourle at Ambrussum between today's Gallargues-le-Montueux in the Gard department and Villetelle in the Hérault department.

In the High Middle Ages, a chapel devoted to St Mary was added to the structure. Only one of the original eleven arches remains in the middle of the river.

Ambrussum contains three archaeological sites of international importance: the Colline de Devès which was first occupied in 2300 BC and settled as an oppidum between 300 BC and 100 AD; the Roman staging post on the Via Domitia which had hotels, a baths and industrial buildings; and the Pont Ambroix.

The bridge was sketched by Anne Rulman in 1620 and the drawing shows only four arches. An 1839 lithograph and a painting by Gustave Courbet (1857) show two arches.

The Vidourlades are violent floods on the Vidourle, in which the water flow increases from a minimum of 3 m^{3}/s to over 3000 m^{3}/s. Floods were recorded 8 October 1723. The floods of 18 November 1745 reduced the bridge from four arches to three. Further major floods occurred 6 October 1812, 21 October 1891, 21 September 1907. The floods of 7 September 1933 reduced the bridge from two arches to the one we see today.

The site was abandoned when transit patterns changed; the Via Domitia became less important and the community relocated to Lunel-Viel which better served a north–south transit pattern, but the bridge continued in use until the late Middle Ages.

The bridge is a Mérimée list National Monument No. PA00103057. The oppidum is Mérimée list National Monument No. PA00103760

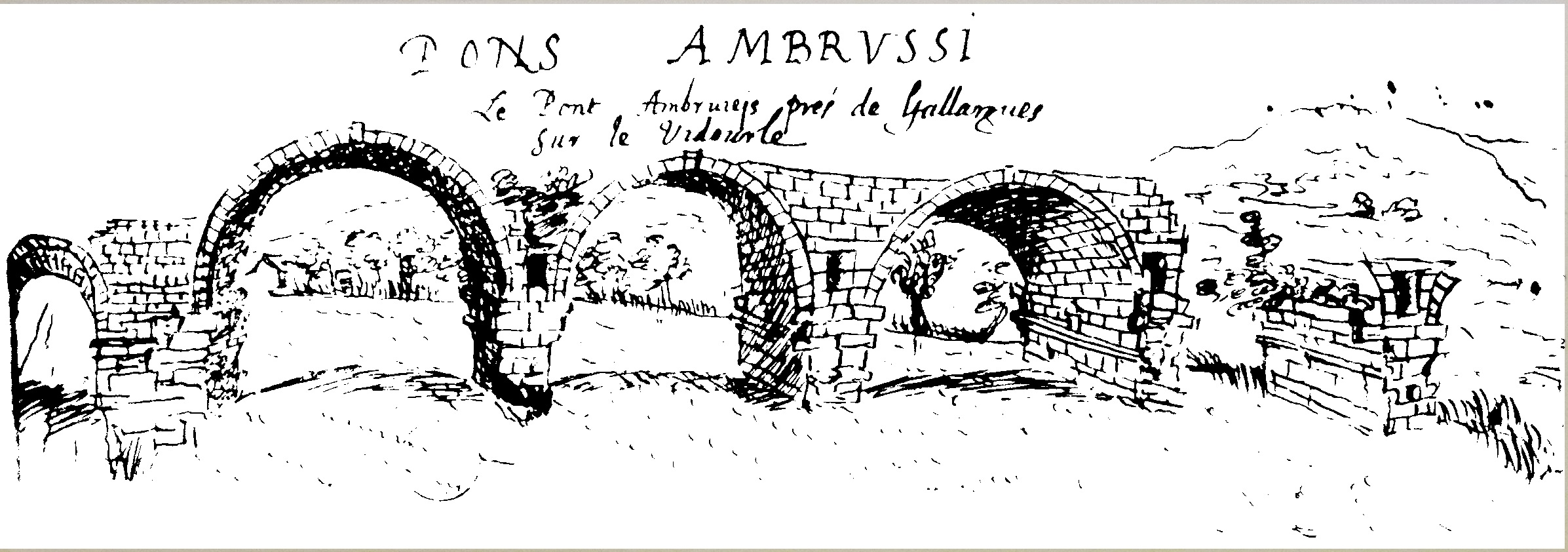
In 1620

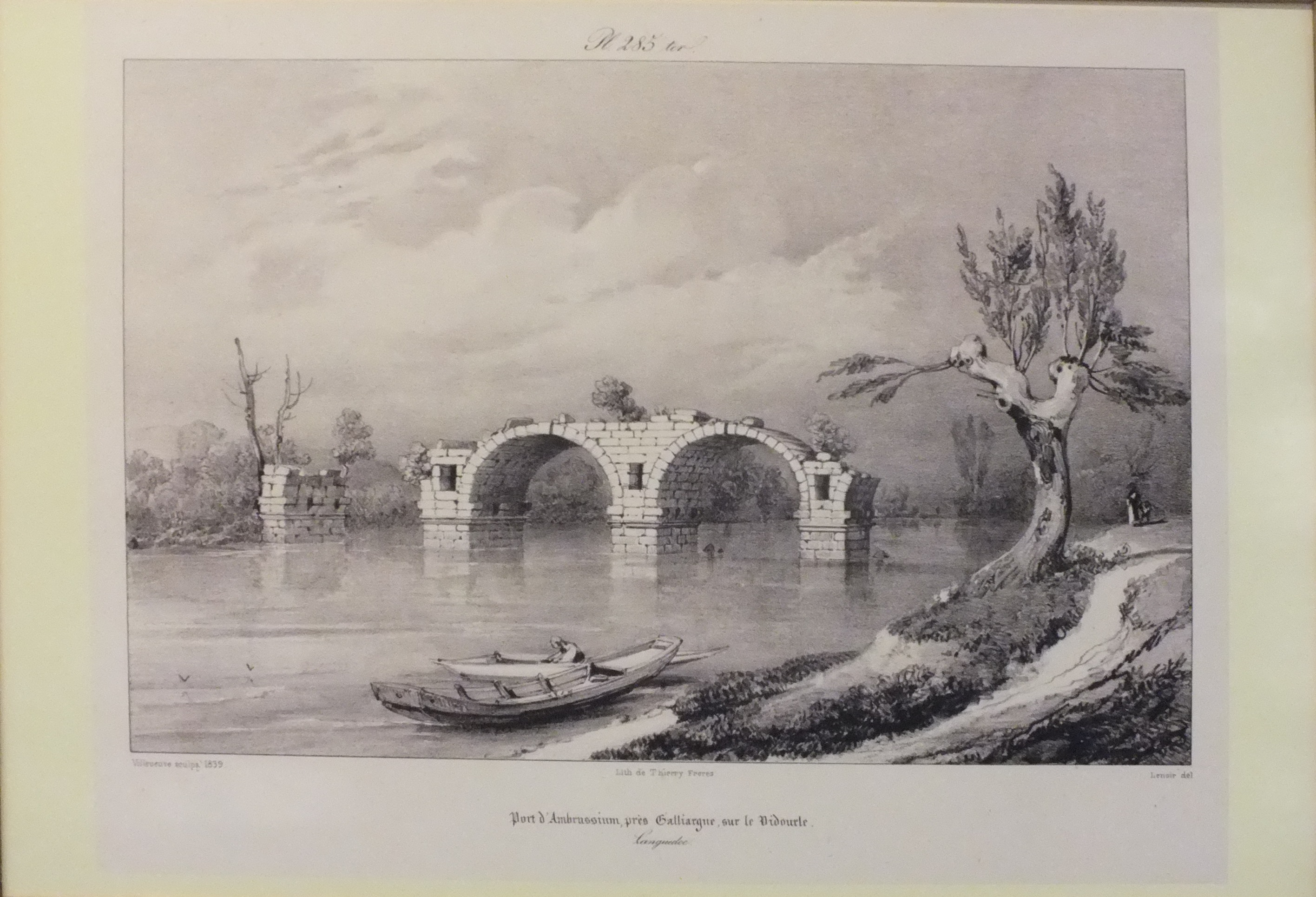
In 1839

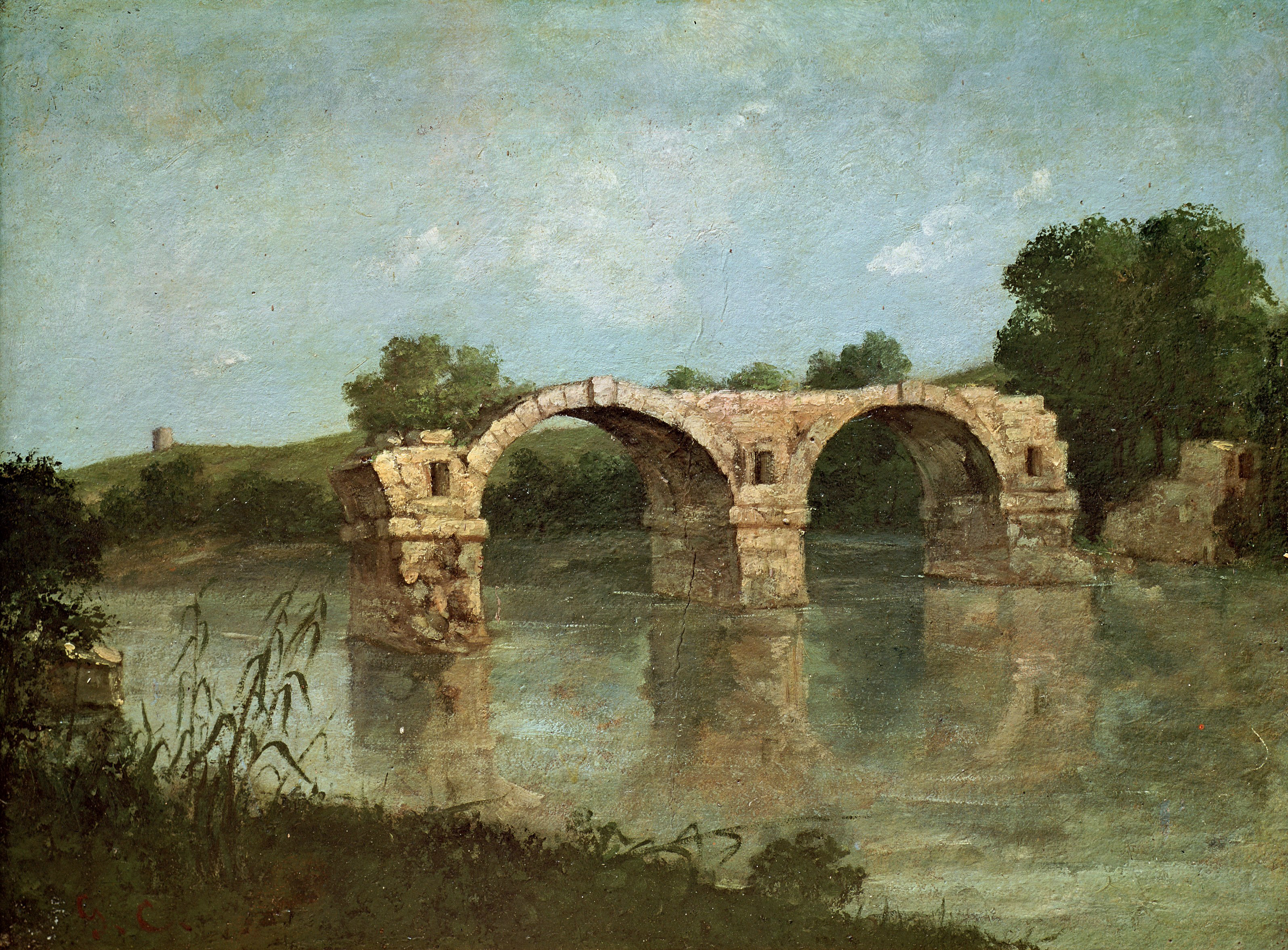
In 1857

== See also ==
- List of bridges in France
- List of Roman bridges
- Roman architecture
- Roman engineering

== Sources ==
- O’Connor, Colin (1993), Roman Bridges, Cambridge University Press, p. 97 (G8), ISBN 0-521-39326-4
