= Canton of Aigues-Mortes =

Coordinates: 43.57°N 4.19°E

The canton of Aigues-Mortes is an administrative division of the Gard department, southern France. Its borders were modified at the French canton reorganisation which came into effect in March 2015. Its seat is in Aigues-Mortes.

== Communes ==
The canton of Aigues-Mortes consists of seven communes:

1. Aigues-Mortes
2. Aimargues
3. Aubais
4. Le Cailar
5. Gallargues-le-Montueux
6. Le Grau-du-Roi
7. Saint-Laurent-d'Aigouze
