= Gallargues-le-Montueux =

- Commune
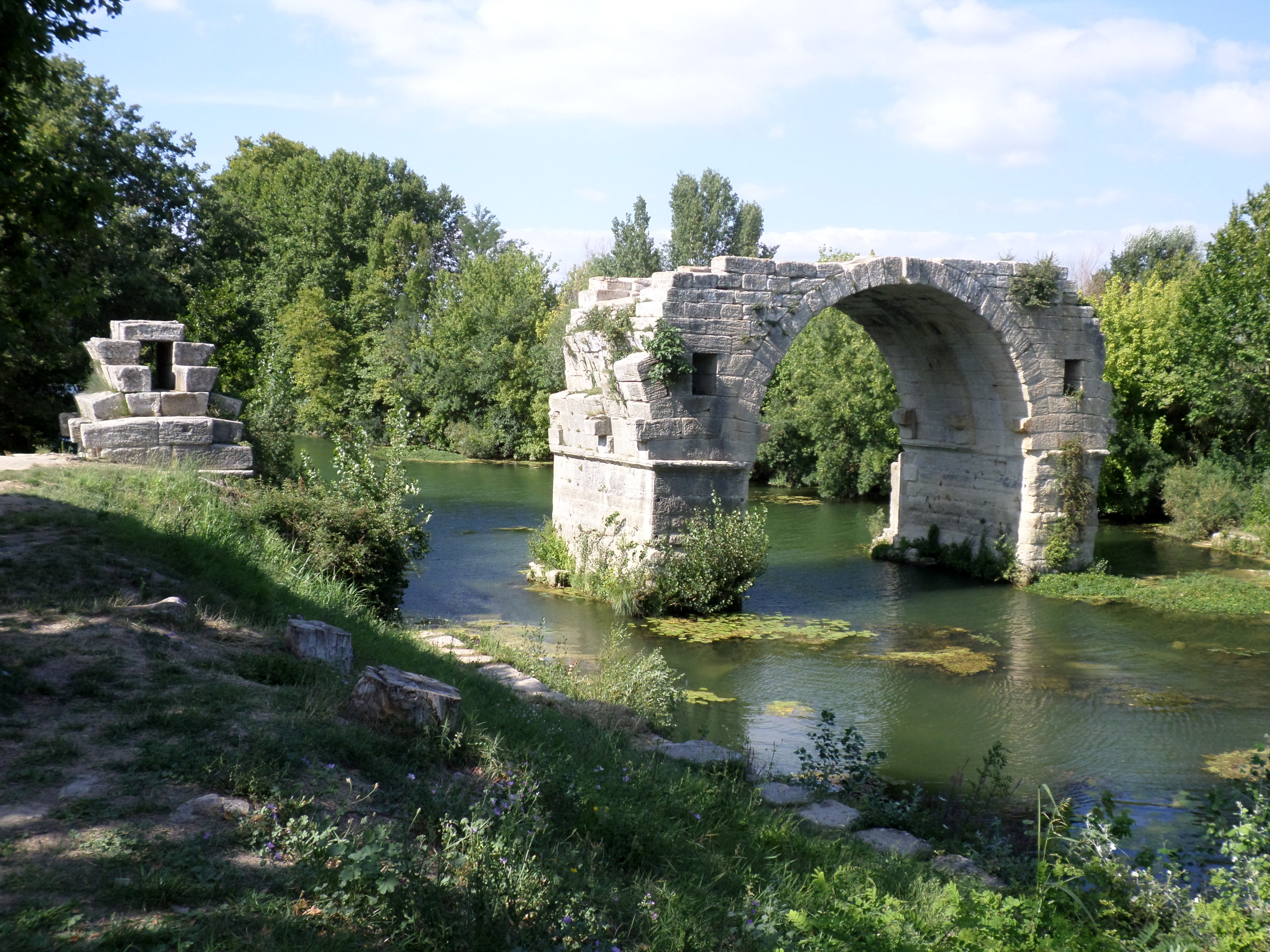
- Pont Ambroix

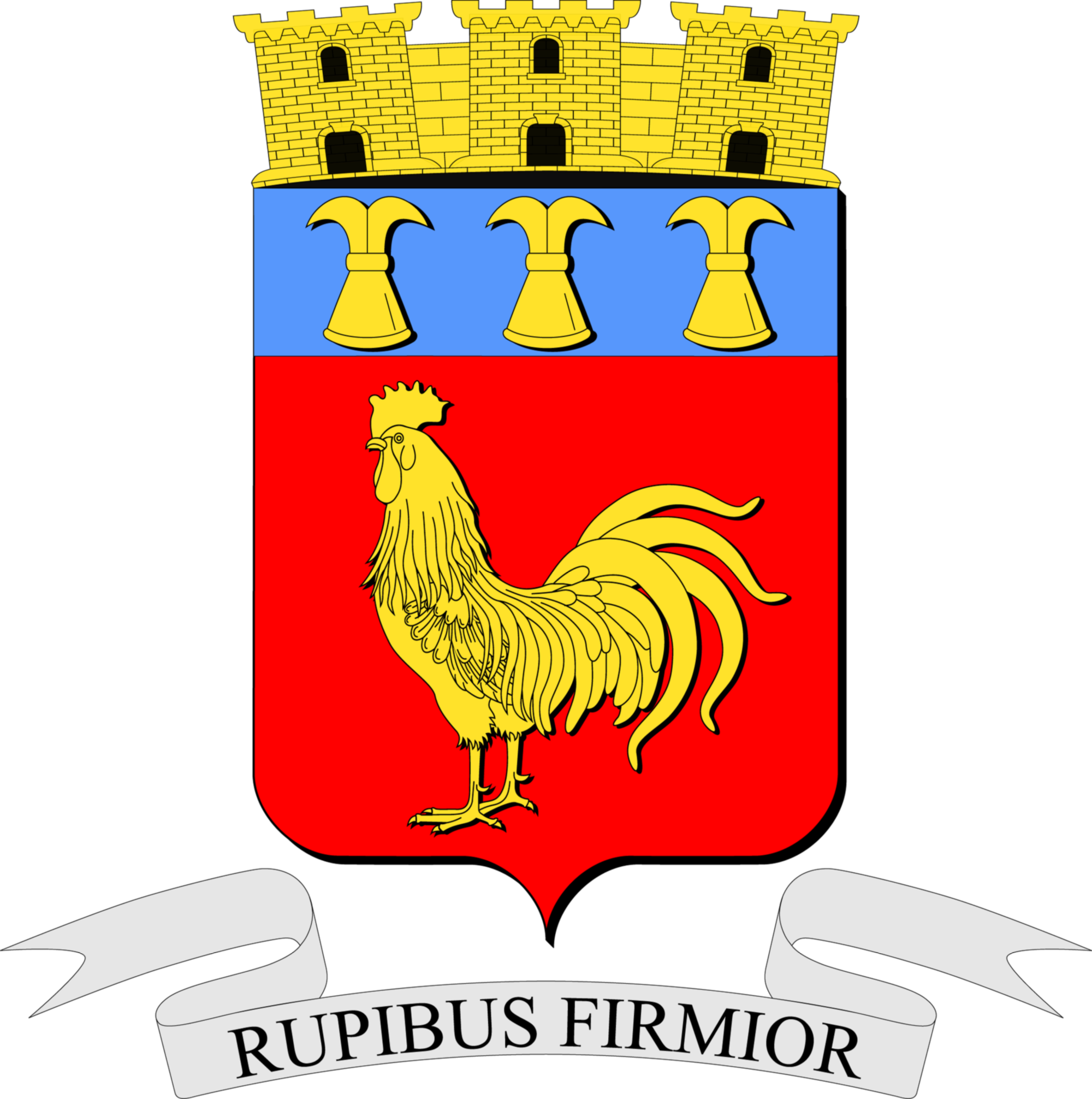
- Coat of arms
- Location of Gallargues-le-Montueux
- Location within France Location within Occitanie
- Coordinates: 43°43′19″N 4°10′25″E
- Country: France
- Region: Occitania
- Department: Gard
- Arrondissement: Nîmes
- Canton: Aigues-Mortes
- Intercommunality: Rhôny Vistre Vidourle

Government
  - Mayor (2020–2026): Freddy Cerda
- Area^{1}: 10.89 km^{2} (4.20 sq mi)
- Elevation: 50 m (160 ft)
- Highest elevation: 65 m (213 ft)
- Lowest elevation: 8 m (26 ft)
- Population (2023): 3,659
  - Density: 336.0/km^{2} (870.2/sq mi)
- Time zone: UTC+01:00 (CET)
  - Summer (DST): UTC+02:00 (CEST)
- INSEE/Postal code: 30123 /30660
- ^{1} French Land Register data, which excludes lakes, ponds, glaciers > 1 km^{2} (0.386 sq mi or 247 acres) and river estuaries.

Gallargues-le-Montueux (French pronunciation: [ɡalaʁɡ lə mɔ̃tɥø]; Occitan: Galargues) is a commune in the Gard department in southern France.

== Geography ==
Gallargues-le-Montueux is situated near the river Vidourle, 6 km northeast of Lunel and 20 km southwest of Nîmes. Gallargues station has rail connections to Nîmes, Avignon and Montpellier.

=== Climate ===
The climate is hot-summer Mediterranean (Köppen: Csa). On 28 June 2019, during the June 2019 European heat wave, a temperature of 45.9 °C (114.6 °F) was recorded in Gallargues-le-Montueux. It was initially reported as the highest temperature in French meteorological history, but a subsequent review of measurements by Météo-France determined that the temperature reached 46.0 °C (114.8 °F) in nearby Verargues.

Climate data for Gallargues-le-Montueux (1991−2020 normals, extremes 1985−2021)
Month	Jan	Feb	Mar	Apr	May	Jun	Jul	Aug	Sep	Oct	Nov	Dec	Year
Record high °C (°F)	22.0 (71.6)	24.7 (76.5)	28.6 (83.5)	32.0 (89.6)	36.0 (96.8)	45.9 (114.6)	39.0 (102.2)	40.1 (104.2)	35.9 (96.6)	33.1 (91.6)	26.1 (79.0)	22.0 (71.6)	45.9 (114.6)
Mean daily maximum °C (°F)	12.2 (54.0)	13.6 (56.5)	17.2 (63.0)	19.8 (67.6)	24.0 (75.2)	28.5 (83.3)	31.6 (88.9)	31.4 (88.5)	26.4 (79.5)	21.3 (70.3)	15.8 (60.4)	12.6 (54.7)	21.2 (70.2)
Daily mean °C (°F)	7.5 (45.5)	8.2 (46.8)	11.4 (52.5)	14.0 (57.2)	17.9 (64.2)	22.0 (71.6)	24.9 (76.8)	24.7 (76.5)	20.3 (68.5)	16.2 (61.2)	11.2 (52.2)	8.0 (46.4)	15.5 (59.9)
Mean daily minimum °C (°F)	2.7 (36.9)	2.8 (37.0)	5.7 (42.3)	8.2 (46.8)	11.9 (53.4)	15.6 (60.1)	18.1 (64.6)	17.9 (64.2)	14.3 (57.7)	11.2 (52.2)	6.6 (43.9)	3.5 (38.3)	9.9 (49.8)
Record low °C (°F)	−12.5 (9.5)	−9.0 (15.8)	−6.7 (19.9)	−0.4 (31.3)	3.5 (38.3)	8.0 (46.4)	11.6 (52.9)	8.5 (47.3)	5.0 (41.0)	−0.9 (30.4)	−5.5 (22.1)	−9.1 (15.6)	−12.5 (9.5)
Average precipitation mm (inches)	56.6 (2.23)	35.9 (1.41)	41.5 (1.63)	63.5 (2.50)	47.3 (1.86)	37.7 (1.48)	19.7 (0.78)	44.2 (1.74)	97.9 (3.85)	87.7 (3.45)	88.8 (3.50)	54.0 (2.13)	674.8 (26.57)
Average precipitation days (≥ 1.0 mm)	5.8	4.7	4.7	6.3	5.6	4.0	2.7	3.6	5.1	6.2	7.2	5.8	61.6
Source: Météo-France

== Population ==
Historical population
Year	Pop.	±% p.a.
1968	1,354	—
1975	1,324	−0.32%
1982	1,633	+3.04%
1990	1,988	+2.49%
1999	2,303	+1.65%
2007	3,136	+3.93%
2012	3,378	+1.50%
2017	3,708	+1.88%
2023	3,659	−0.22%
Source: INSEE

== Education ==
There is a public preschool/nursery (école maternelle) as well as the public École Élémentaire la Maurelle.

The collège (junior high school) serving the community is Collège de Gallargues-le-Montueux. In addition to Gallargues-le-Montueux, it also serves Aigues-Vives and Aimargues. It opened in September 2014. As of 2017 it has about 600 students.

== See also ==
- Pont Ambroix
- Communes of the Gard department

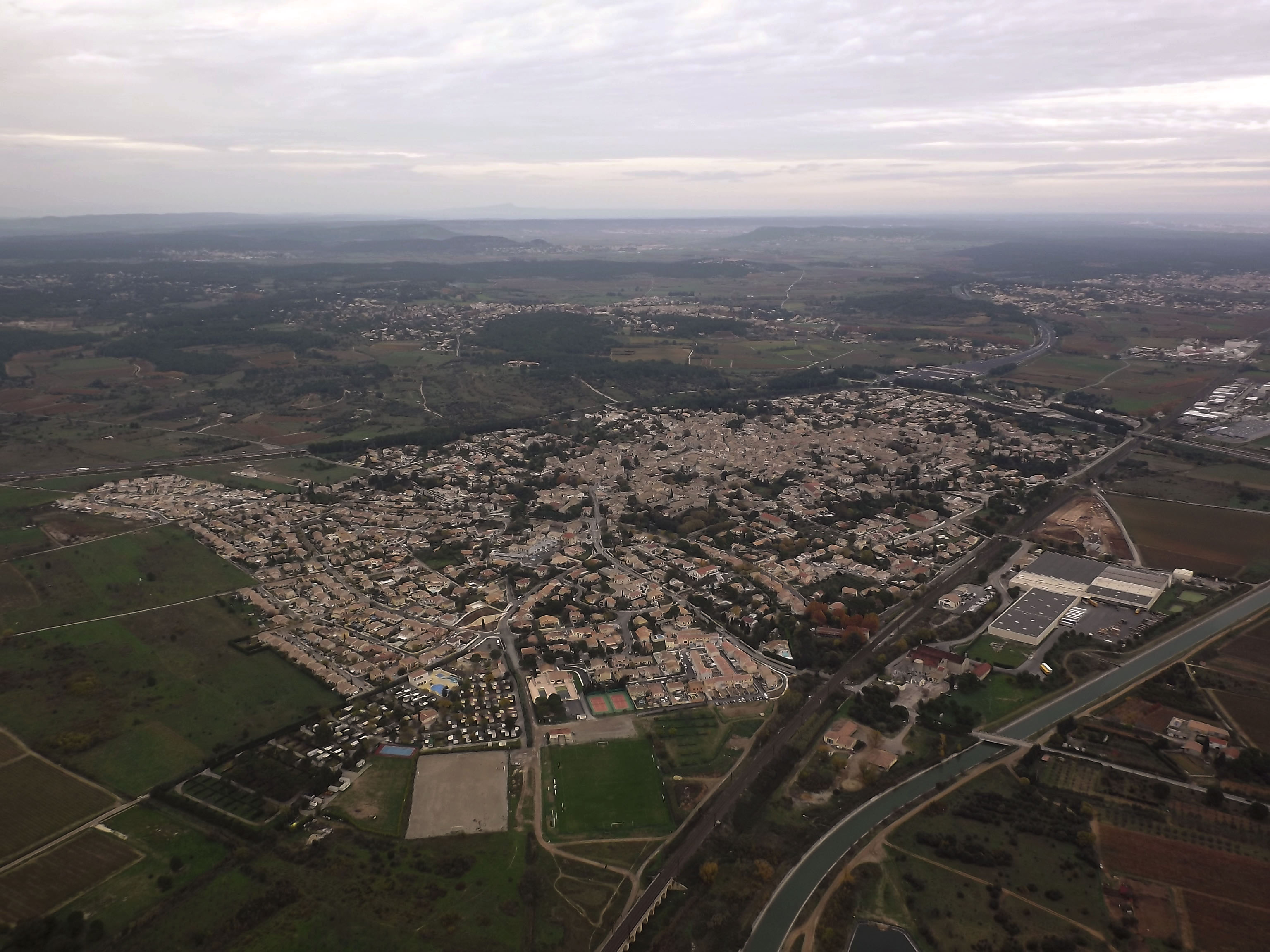
Gallargues-le-Montueux
