= René Grousset =

French historian and curator (1885–1952

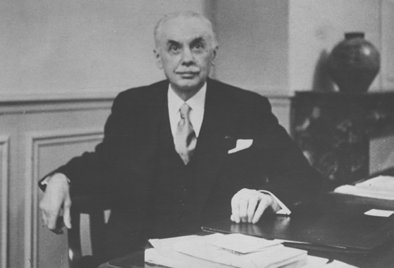
- Born: 5 September 1885; Aubais, Gard, France
- Died: 12 September 1952 (aged 67); Paris, France
- Occupations: historian and curator

René Grousset (French pronunciation: [ʁəne ɡʁusɛ]; 5 September 1885 – 12 September 1952) was a French historian who was curator of both the Cernuschi Museum and the Guimet Museum in Paris and a member of the Académie française.

He wrote several major works on Asiatic and Oriental civilizations, with his two most important works being Histoire des croisades et du royaume franc de Jérusalem (1934–1936) and The Empire of the Steppes: A History of Central Asia (1939), both of which were considered standard references on the subject.

== Biography ==
Grousset was born in Aubais, Gard, in 1885. Having graduated from the University of Montpellier with a degree in history, he soon began his distinguished career soon. He served in the French Army during World War I. In 1925, Grousset was appointed adjunct conservator of the Musée Guimet in Paris and secretary of the Journal asiatique.

By 1930, he had published five major works on Asiatic and Oriental civilizations. In 1933, he was appointed director of the Cernuschi Museum in Paris and curator of its Asiatic art collections. He wrote a major work on the Chinese Buddhist medieval pilgrim Xuanzang, particularly emphasising the importance of his visit to the northern Indian Buddhist university of Nalanda.

At the outbreak of World War II, Grousset had published his two most important works, Histoire des Croisades (1934-1936) and L'Empire des Steppes (1939).

Dismissed from his museum posts by the Vichy government, he continued his research privately and published three volumes on China and the Mongols during the war. After the liberation of France, he resumed his curatorship of the Cernuschi Museum and was also appointed curator of the Guimet Museum. In 1946, Grousset was made a member of the French Academy. Between 1946 and 1949, he published four final works, concentrating on Asia Minor and the Near East.

In 1952, Grousset died at the age of 67 in Paris.

== Judgments ==
The British historian Christopher Tyerman points out that upon publication, Grousset's History of the Crusades came under criticism, on the one hand for not analyzing the political system of what Grousset considered to be a French state in the Levant and on the other hand for exaggerating or misrepresenting the cultural sympathy between overseas communities. The American historians Frederic Duncalf and John Life La Monte were particularly severe.

In 1981, the German historian Hans Eberhard Mayer estimated that Grousset's "History of the Crusades" was, among the general works on this subject, "the one in which chauvinism in crusade research raised its ugly head for a last time".

More recently, Grousset's successors have noted that his outlook was shaped by his ideas about France's colonial role. In 2001, fr:Joël Gourdon wrote: "René Grousset produced a work entirely dedicated to France's colonial role. He sees in the colonial adventure the admirable synthesis of the most sacred values for him: Christianity, the fatherland and the State, even republican. He projects this ideal into the Middle Ages and sees in the Crusades the first expression of this 'civilizing mission' which is that of eternal France."

In 2007, the French medieval historian Pierre Aubé expressed himself on Grousset in the following manner: "This historian, who knew how to rely on the best of the greatest orientalists of his time, whose erudition is of a rare solidity when it comes to establishing facts, is very oriented when it comes to interpreting them. His angle of vision is very marked by the colonialist utopia that prevailed in the 1920s and 1930s when he built his opus magnum."

For fr:Vadime Elisseeff, who succeeded him as director of the Cernuschi Museum, Grousset is "the last of the great classics, those for whom the “sense of history” was more a matter of psychology of beings than of the material conditions of existence, whose physical and moral impact on the lives of individuals had not yet been emphasized by the sciences. His works are valuable by the intelligence of the views and by facts presented in a clear and easily readable style.

== Honors and Awards ==
- Croix de guerre 1914-1918
- Officer of the Order of Legion of Honour

== Works ==
- 1922 – Histoire de l'Asie , 4 vol., Paris: G. Crès & cie. OCLC 4594662
- 1923 – Histoire de la philosophie orientale
- 1924 – Le réveil de l'Asie
- 1926 – L'épopée des Croisades
- 1928 – La Grèce et l'Orient, des guerres médiques à la conquête romaine
- 1929 – Histoire de l'Extrême-Orient
- 1929 – Sur les traces de Bouddha, tableau du VIIe siècle bouddhique
- (in English) In the Footsteps of the Buddha. JA Underwood (trans) Orion Press. New York (1971)
- 1929–1930 – Les civilisations de l'Orient, 4 vol.
- 1931 – Les philosophies indiennes
- 1934–1936 – Histoire des Croisades et du royaume franc de Jérusalem , 3 vol. Paris: Plon. OCLC 37267632
- 1936 – L'art de l'Extrême Orient : paysages, fleurs, animaux
- 1937 – De Venise à Pékin au XIVe siècle : Odoric de Pordenone (with H. Demoulin-Bernard)
- 1939 – Les sculptures des Indes et de la Chine
- 1939 – L'empire des steppes : Attila, Gengis-Khan, Tamerlan Paris: Editions Payot. OCLC 220712631
- (in English) The Empire of the Steppes. (tr., Naomi Walford). New Brunswick: Rutgers University Press. (1970) ISBN 978-0-8135-1304-1; OCLC 90972.
- 1941 – L'empire mongol
- 1941 – L'Asie orientale, des origines au XVe siècle (with J. Auboyer et J. Buhot)
- 1942 – Histoire de Chine
- 1944 – Le conquérant du monde : vie de Gengis-Khan
- 1945 – L'Europe orientale de 1081 à 1453 (with C. DIehl, R. Guilland et L. Oeconomos)
- 1946 – L'empire du Levant : histoire de la question d'Orient
- 1946 – Bilan de l'histoire
- 1947 – Histoire de l'Arménie des origines à 1071 Paris: Payot. OCLC 3084562
- 1948 – De la Grèce à la Chine
- 1949 – Figures de proue
- 1950 – Les premières civilisations (collective work)
- 1950 – De l'Inde au Cambodge et à Java (with J. Auboyer)
- 1951 – De la Chine au Japon

== See also ==
- Eurasian Steppe
