= Aigues-Mortes station =

Railway station in Aigues-Mortes, France

Aigues-Mortes
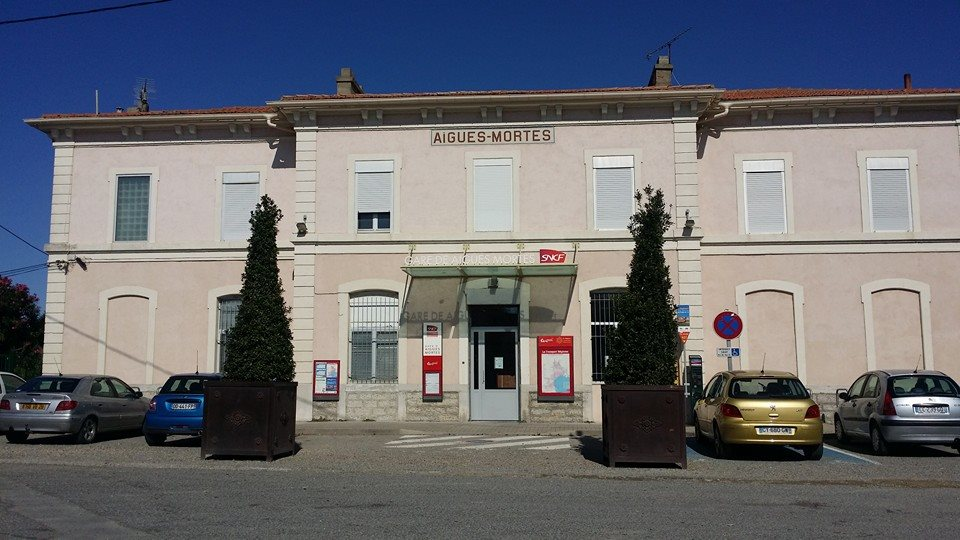
- Aigues-Mortes Station

General information
- Location: Aigues-Mortes, Occitanie, France
- Coordinates: 43.57095°N 4.19105°E
- Line: Saint-Césaire–Le Grau-du-Roi railway

Other information
- Station code: 87775858

Services
Preceding station	TER Occitanie	Following station
Saint-Laurent-d'Aigouze towards Nîmes	26	Le Grau-du-Roi Terminus
Location

Aigues-Mortes is a railway station in Aigues-Mortes, Occitanie, southern France. Within TER Occitanie, it is part of line 26 (Nîmes-Le Grau-du-Roi).
