= Le Grau-du-Roi station =

Railway station in Le Grau-du-Roi, France

Le Grau-du-Roi
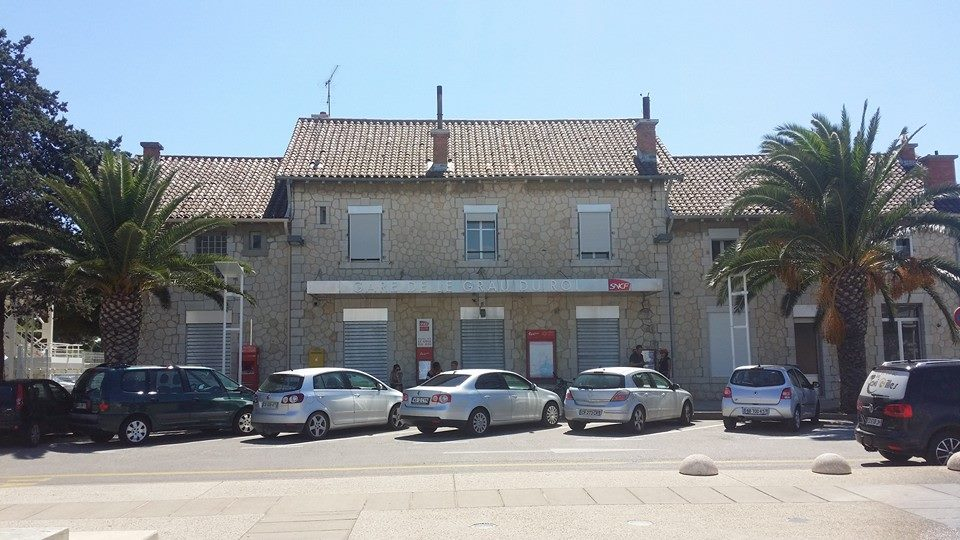
- Le Grau du Roi station

General information
- Location: Le Grau-du-Roi, Occitanie, France
- Coordinates: 43.53706°N 4.14043°E
- Line: Saint-Césaire–Le Grau-du-Roi railway

Other information
- Station code: 87775866

Services
Preceding station	TER Occitanie	Following station
Aigues-Mortes towards Nîmes	26	Terminus
Location

Le Grau-du-Roi is a railway station in Le Grau-du-Roi, Occitanie, southern France. Within TER Occitanie, it is part of line 26 (Nîmes-Le Grau-du-Roi).
