= Saint-Laurent-d'Aigouze =

- Commune
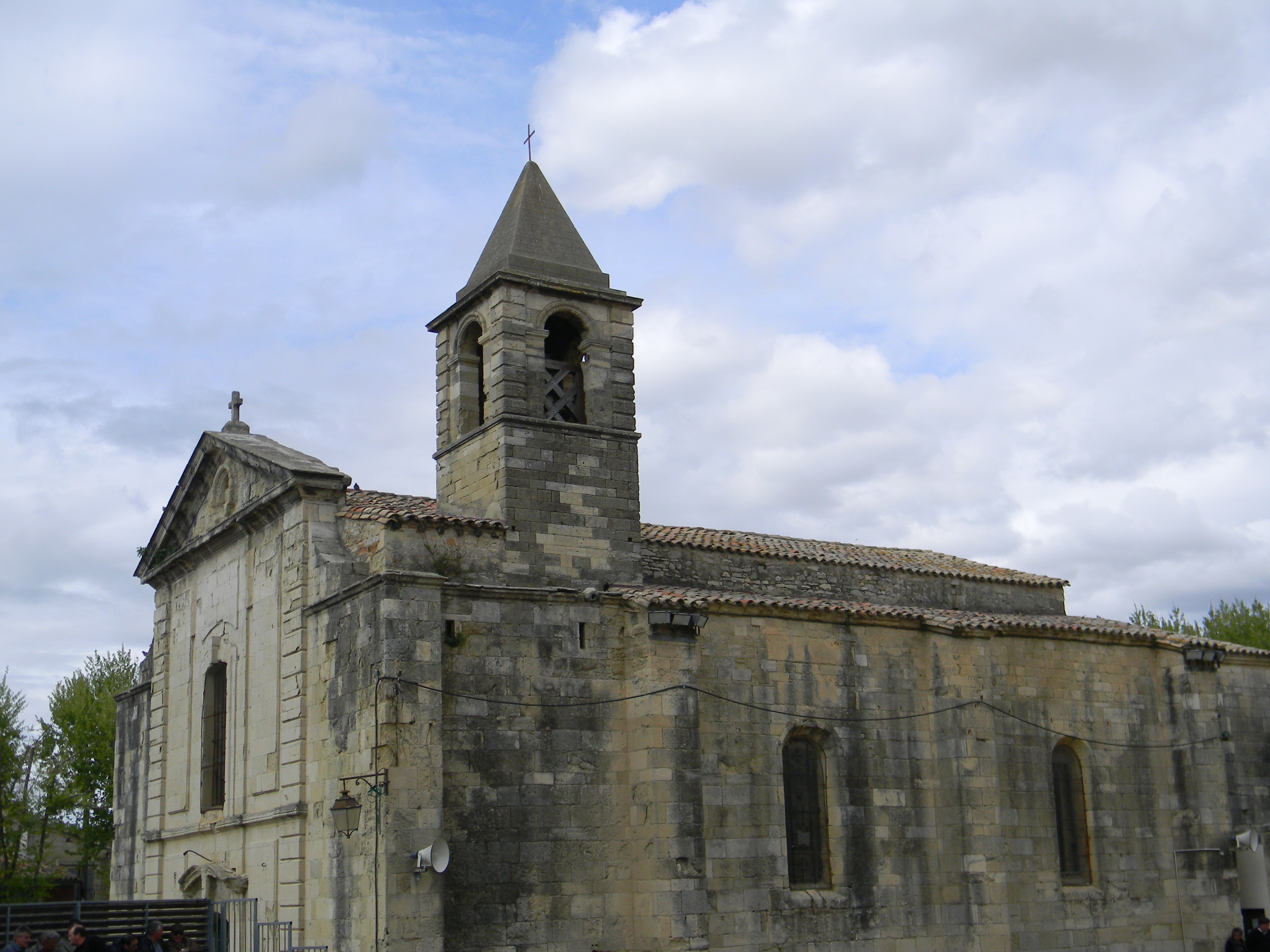
- The church of Saint-Laurent-d'Aigouze

- Coat of arms
- Location of Saint-Laurent-d'Aigouze
- Location within France Location within Occitanie
- Coordinates: 43°38′07″N 4°11′46″E
- Country: France
- Region: Occitania
- Department: Gard
- Arrondissement: Nîmes
- Canton: Aigues-Mortes
- Intercommunality: Terre de Camargue

Government
  - Mayor (2020–2026): Thierry Féline
- Area^{1}: 89.81 km^{2} (34.68 sq mi)
- Elevation: 5 m (16 ft)
- Highest elevation: 6 m (20 ft)
- Lowest elevation: 0 m (0 ft)
- Population (2023): 3,690
  - Density: 41.1/km^{2} (106/sq mi)
- Time zone: UTC+01:00 (CET)
  - Summer (DST): UTC+02:00 (CEST)
- INSEE/Postal code: 30276 /30220
- ^{1} French Land Register data, which excludes lakes, ponds, glaciers > 1 km^{2} (0.386 sq mi or 247 acres) and river estuaries.

Saint-Laurent-d'Aigouze (French pronunciation: [sɛ̃ loʁɑ̃ deɡuz]; Provençal: Sent Laurenç de Gosa) is a commune in the Gard department in southern France. Saint-Laurent-d'Aigouze station has rail connections to Nîmes and Le Grau-du-Roi.

The commune contains the ruins of Psalmody Abbey, a Benedictine monastery founded in the 5th century.

== Population ==
Historical population
Year	Pop.	±% p.a.
1968	1,862	—
1975	1,728	−1.06%
1982	1,730	+0.02%
1990	2,323	+3.75%
1999	2,738	+1.84%
2007	3,210	+2.01%
2012	3,343	+0.82%
2017	3,474	+0.77%
2023	3,690	+1.01%
Source: INSEE

== See also ==
- Communes of the Gard department

== Trivia ==
- Saint-Laurent-d'Aigouze is the filming location for the soap opera Ici tout commence, which its main set at the fictional Institut Auguste Armand culinary institute.
