= Base Mérimée =

French database of monuments

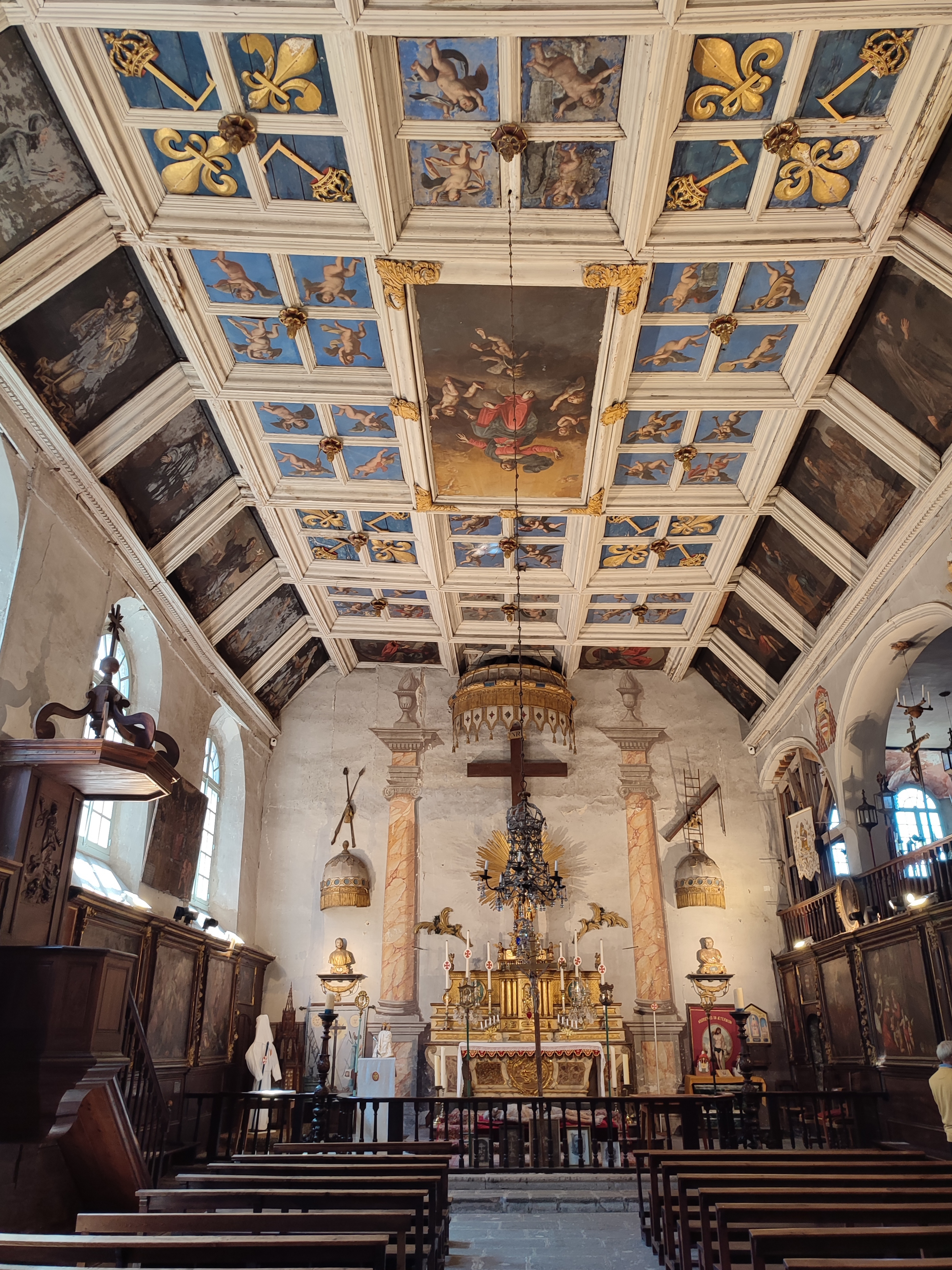
The Chapelle des Pénitents Blancs du Puy-en-Velay, added to the Base Mérimée in 1989

The Base Mérimée (French pronunciation: [baz meʁime]) is the database of French monumental and architectural heritage, created and maintained by the French Ministry of Culture. It was created in 1978, and placed online in 1995. The database is periodically updated, and contains more than 320,000 entries as of October 2020. It covers religious, domestic, agricultural, educational, military and industrial architecture, and is subdivided into three domains: historical monuments, general inventory, and architecture (including remarkable contemporary architecture). The database was named after writer, historian and inspector-general of historical monuments Prosper Mérimée, who published the first survey of historic monuments in 1840.

== See also ==
- Base Palissy, database of French movable heritage
- List of heritage registers globally
- Monument historique, the official classification for French historic monuments
