= Vidourle =

River in southern France

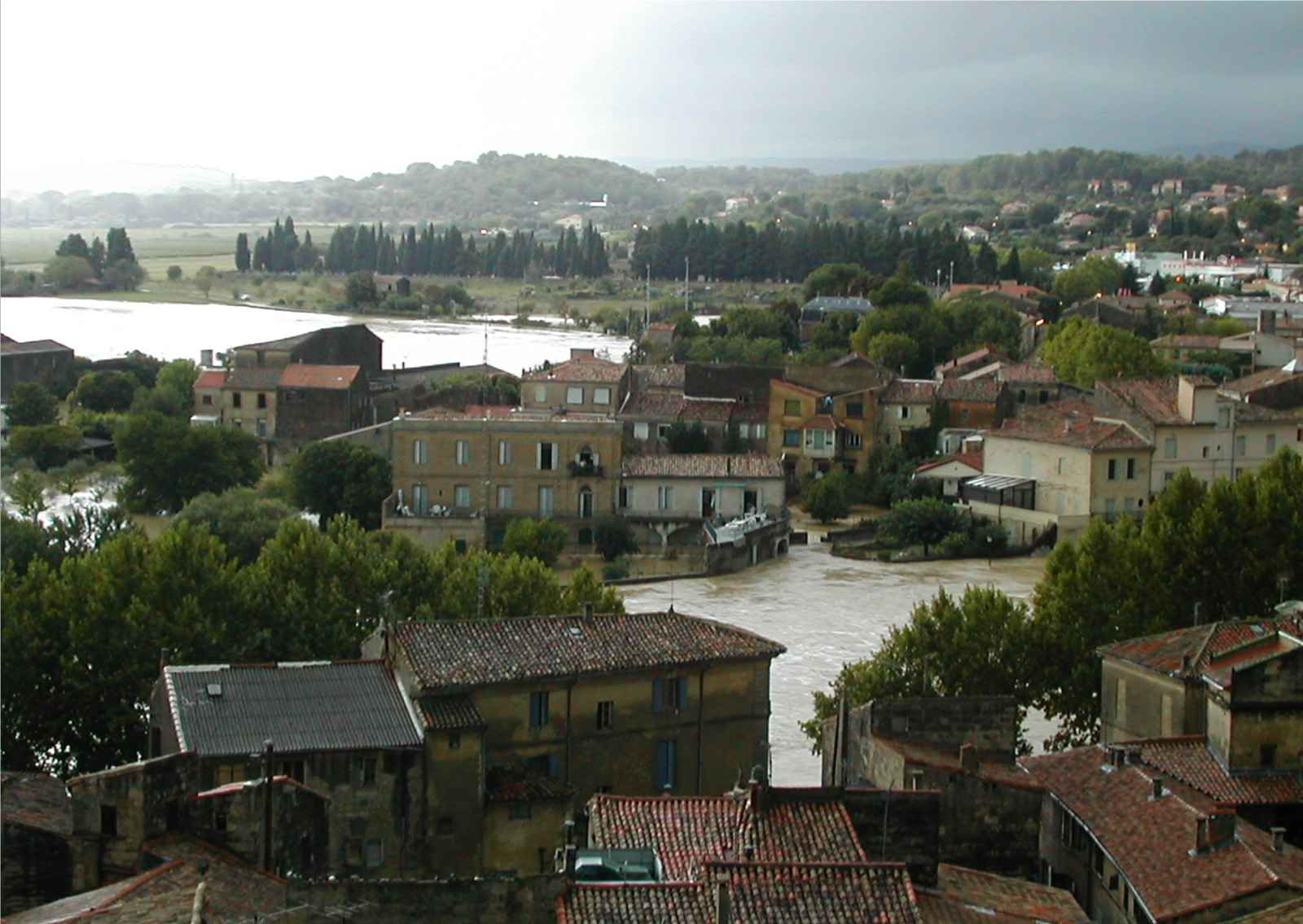

Location
- Country: France
- Region: Occitanie

Physical characteristics
- Source
  - location: Cévennes
- Mouth
  - location: Mediterranean Sea
  - coordinates: 43°32′8″N 4°8′3″E
- Length: 95.0 km (59.0 mi)
- Basin size: 1,335 km^{2} (515 mi^{2})
- Discharge
  - average: 20 m^{3}/s (710 cu ft/s)

The Vidourle (French pronunciation: [viduʁl]; Vidorle in occitan) is a 95.0 km (59.0 mi) river in southern France that flows into the Mediterranean Sea in Le Grau-du-Roi. Its source is in the Cévennes mountains, northwest of Saint-Hippolyte-du-Fort, at Saint-Roman-de-Codières. It flows generally southeast. At Gallargues-le-Montueux, it was crossed by the old Roman road Via Domitia with the now ruined Roman bridge Pont Ambroix.

The Vidourle flows through the following departments and towns:

- Gard: Saint-Roman-de-Codières, Saint-Hippolyte-du-Fort, Sauve, Quissac, Sommières
- Hérault: Lunel, Marsillargues
- Gard: Saint-Laurent-d'Aigouze, Le Grau-du-Roi
