= Francois Chicoyneau =

French doctor and physician

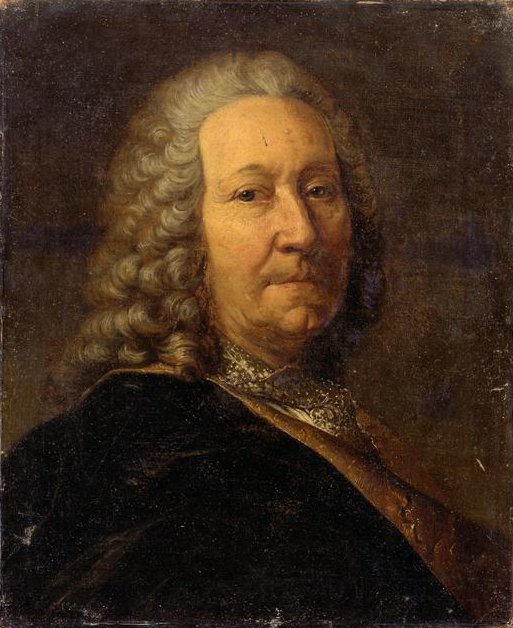
Portrait of François Chicoyneau by Claude Arnulphy (1750). Castle of Versailles. Oil on canvas, 51 x 42 cm.

François Chicoyneau (23 April 1672– 13 April 1752) was a French doctor, court physician, and chancellor of the University of Montpellier (then in Languedoc). Chicoyneau was the First Physician to King Louis XV. He is especially known for investigating and writing about the Great Plague of Marseille.

== Family ==
Chicoyneau was born in Montpellier in 1672. He came from the Nobility of the Robe.

François Chicoyneau's father, Michel Chicoyneau, also a physician, was born in Blois in 1626, the son of Michel Chicoyneau, elected in the election of Blois, and Marie Richier de Belleval, of Picardy origin. The couple were married in Blois in 1624. The Chicoyneaus were bourgeois from Blois who, from the condition of draper merchants, rose to the offices of notary and tax collector. In 1652, François Chicoyneau's father joined his cousin Martin Richer de Belleval, who practiced medicine, in Montpellier. He succeeded him, in 1664, as intendant of the Royal Garden. In 1678, he became a counsellor in the court of accounts, aid and finance of Montpellier, a charge which conferred on him nobility.

François Chicoyneau's mother, Catherine de Pichot, was the daughter of Balthasar Pichot, king's adviser in the court of accounts, aid and finance of Montpellier, and of Catherine de Pourtalès. In addition to François, Michel Chicoyneau and Catherine de Pichot had two other children:

- Michel Aimé (1670 6 - 1691 7 );
- Gaspard (1673 8 - 1693 9 ), accidentally drowned in the Lez while botanizing;

== Career ==
A physician and faculty member of the University of Montpelier, he and two colleagues were dispatched to investigate the epidemic and confirm that it was indeed bubonic plague. He was a member of the French Academy of Sciences.

He died in Versailles on 13 April 1752 (at age 79).
