= Chantavoine =

Chantavoine may refer to:

- Curé Chantavoine, a character in Mademoiselle Fifi, an opera by the Russian composer César Cui
- Henri Chantavoine (1850–1918), a French writer and professor of rhetoric
- Jean Chantavoine (1877–1952), a French musicologist
