= Pons Augustin Alletz =

French agronomist

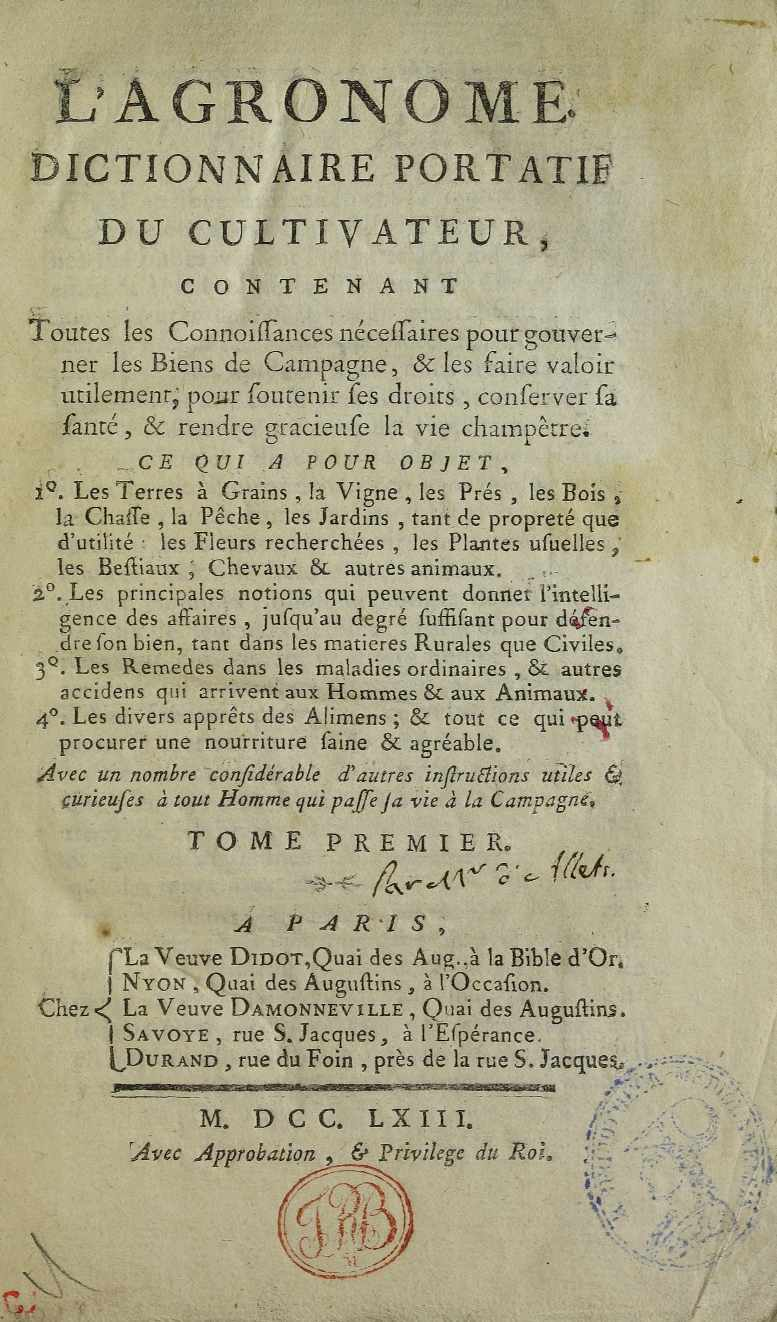
L'Agronome ("The Agronomist"), 1763

Pons Augustin Alletz (born 1703 in Montpellier, died 7 March 1785 in Paris) was a French agronomist.

Alletz spent some years living in a catholic community belonging to the Oratory of Saint Philip Neri before working as a lawyer in Montpellier. He quickly abandoned law, however, and moved to Paris to devote himself entirely to writing. His numerous works are nearly all useful reference texts.

Alletz's most famous work, L'Agronome, ou Dictionnaire portatif du cultivateur ("The Agronomist, or Portable Dictionary of the Farmer"), was first published in 1760 in a two-volume format and was frequently republished until the 19th century; it was considered one of the best manuals of country living during its time. Besides advice on gardening, raising livestock, veterinary medicine, and hunting, the manual contains a large number of practical recipes fit to satisfy a sophisticated country epicure. The section devoted to wine and wine-making is significant and covers such topics as pairing wines, anecdotes concerning wine, authors who wrote about wine, types of wine, and vinegar recipes.

Alletz is the grandfather of the author Édouard Alletz.

== Works ==
- Historia Aegypti naturalis (in Latin). Vol. 1. Leiden: Gerrit Potvliet. 1735.
  - Historia Aegypti naturalis (in Latin). Vol. 2. Leiden: Gerrit Potvliet. 1735.
