= Citadel of Montpellier =

Coordinates: 43°36′42″N 3°53′10″E

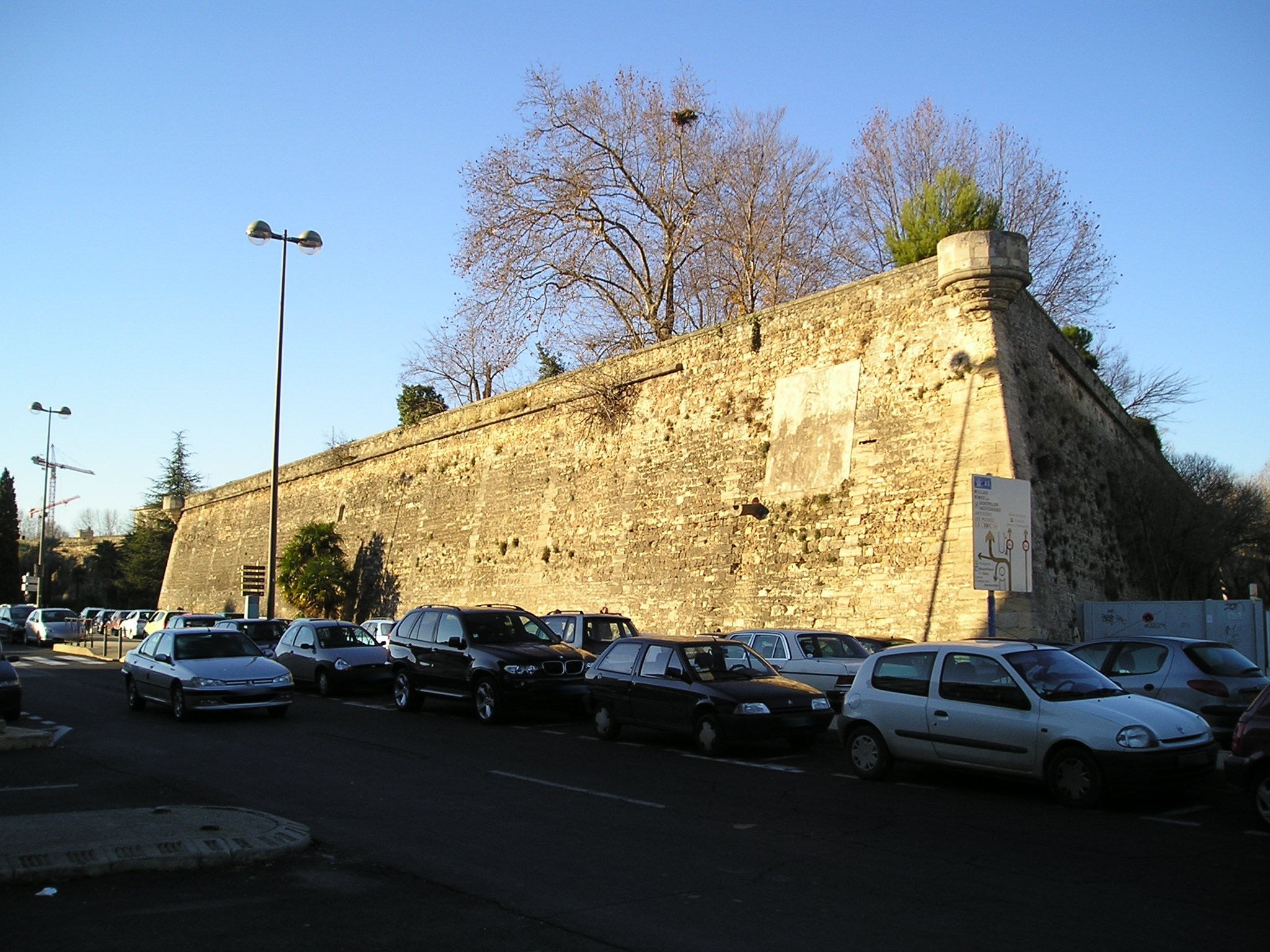
The Bastion de Ventadour

The Citadel of Montpellier is an Early Modern fortification in the city of Montpellier, in the Hérault département of southern France. It was built between 1624 and 1627, after several rebellions under the orders of Louis XIII in order to keep watch over the town. In the 20th century it became the Joffre Barracks, named after Joseph Joffre, and since 1947 the citadel has been an academic campus – the nationwide famous Lycée Joffre.

== History ==
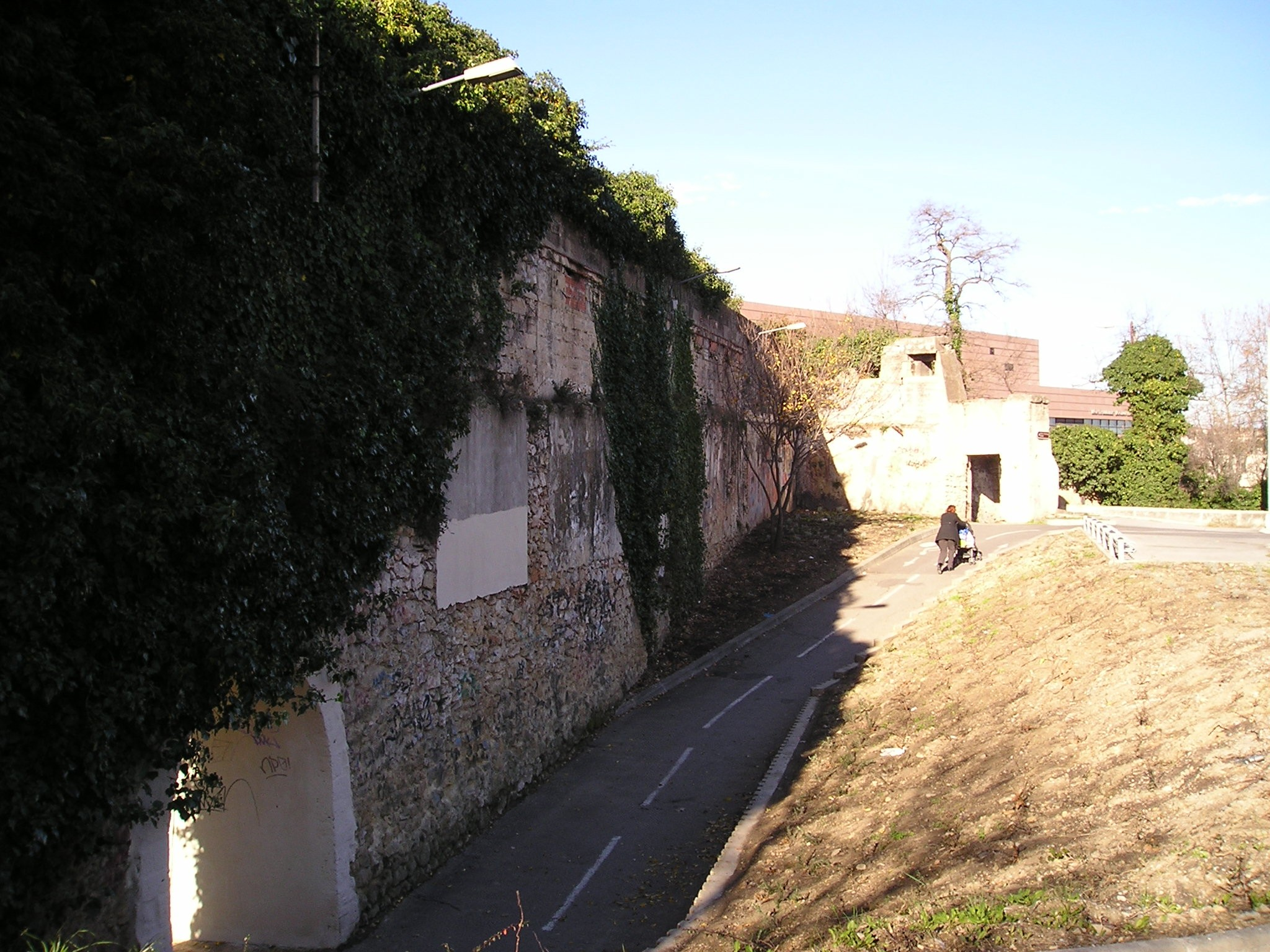
Remains of the Bastion du Roi, as seen from within the citadel

=== Military history ===
In 1621, King Louis XIII arrived with soldiers to quell a Huguenot rebellion; he took over the city after an eight-month siege. The king ordered that a royal citadel close to the city be constructed to control the city and the surrounding region, where there was a large Huguenot population.

The citadel was built between 1624 and 1627 between the fortifications of the Écusson, or old town, and the coastal plain of the River Lez. It was separated from the city proper by a wide esplanade, looking over the floodplain of the Lez. It comprised four bastions organized in a square: facing the city was the Bastion du Roi ("King's Bastion") to the northwest and the Bastion de la Reine ("Queen's Bastion") to the southwest; facing the floodplain was the Bastion de Montmorency to the northeast and the Bastion de Ventadour to the southeast.

The buildings within the citadel have been reconstructed multiple times. The last reconstruction before the citadel was converted into an educational building was in 1863.

Under the Ancien Régime, the citadel held royal troops as well as detachments of conscripted forces from Bas-Languedoc. Later, it became a barracks of the 2nd regiment of Génie.

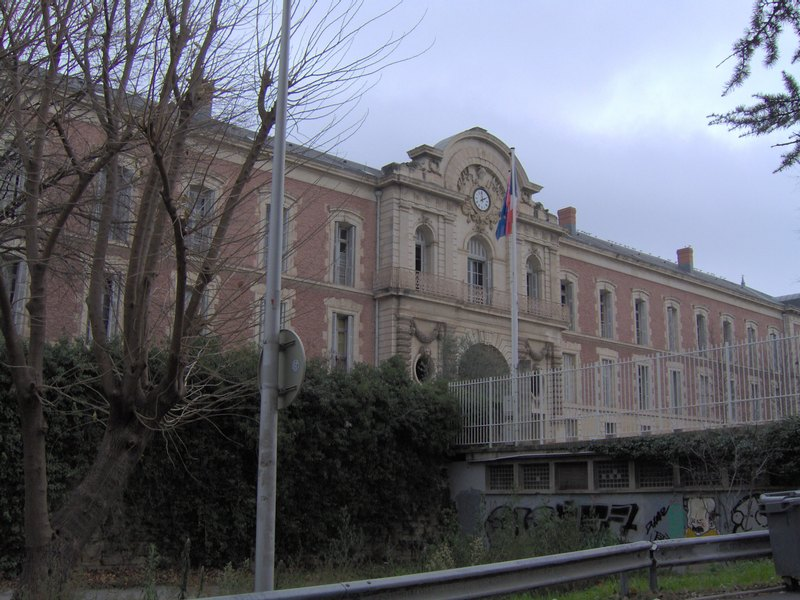
The Lycée Joffre as it appears today

=== Scholarly history ===
During the 19th century, it became clear that the high school for young men in Montpellier was too small: having been built near the esplanade in 1804 in the same place as a former Jesuit school, by the later part of the century, the high school and its students were dispersed throughout two other sites north of the old town.

In 1947 city authorities decided to move the high school into the citadel, which had since become the Joffre Barracks. The first classes were held there on 1 October 1948, and the last students were moved in during October 1959.

Since then, the buildings have been adapted to present-day life and new buildings for classrooms have been added. The powder magazine of the Bastion de Montmorency has been converted into an olympic pool and large gymnasium, and the nearby fields into athletic fields. The academic campus, constituted of the middle school, high school and classes préparatoires, occupies 15 hectares.

== Remains still intact ==
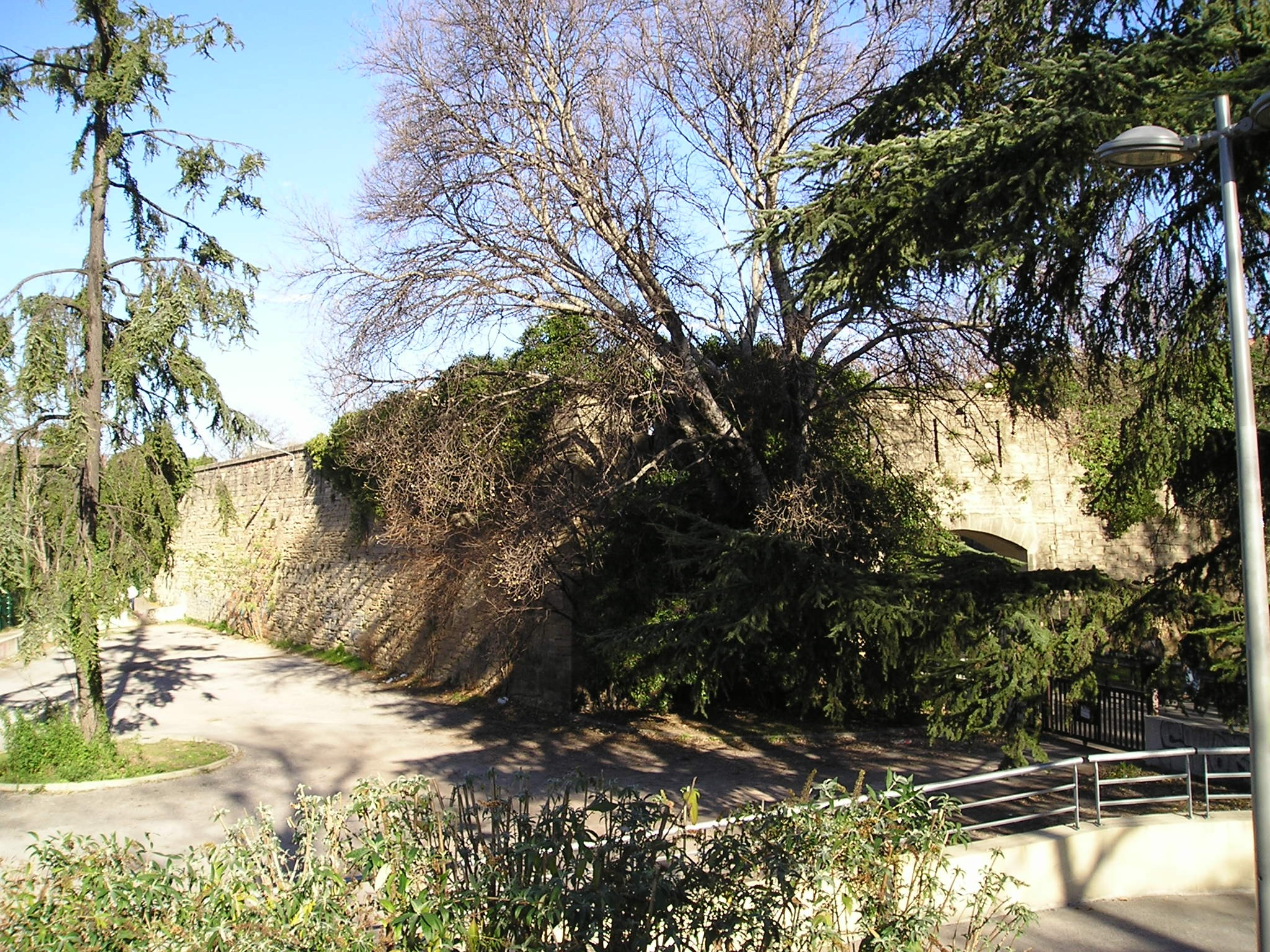
Remains of the Bastion du Roi near the Place de la Comédie

Of the original citadel, the following vestiges remain:

- The two southern bastions (la Bastion de la Reine and la Bastion de Ventadour) and the wall linking them have been preserved. There is a palm grove planted at the base of the wall; the two bastions and the wall face the Allée Henri II de Montmorency ("Alley of Henry II of Montmorency") and the district of Antigone.
- On the west side there remains the Bastion du Roi, which has been broken in multiple places to allow for construction of automobile access roads and pedestrian footpaths between the northern parking lot and the center of Montpellier. The walls and their embrasures are still visible. A railway coming from the Gare de Montpellier Saint-Roch crosses the base of the old wall in a tunnel.
- At the north, the Bastion de Montmorency is visible, standing over a parking lot and the adjoining Board of Education buildings. It currently serves as the gymnasium of the Lycée Joffre.

== Gallery ==
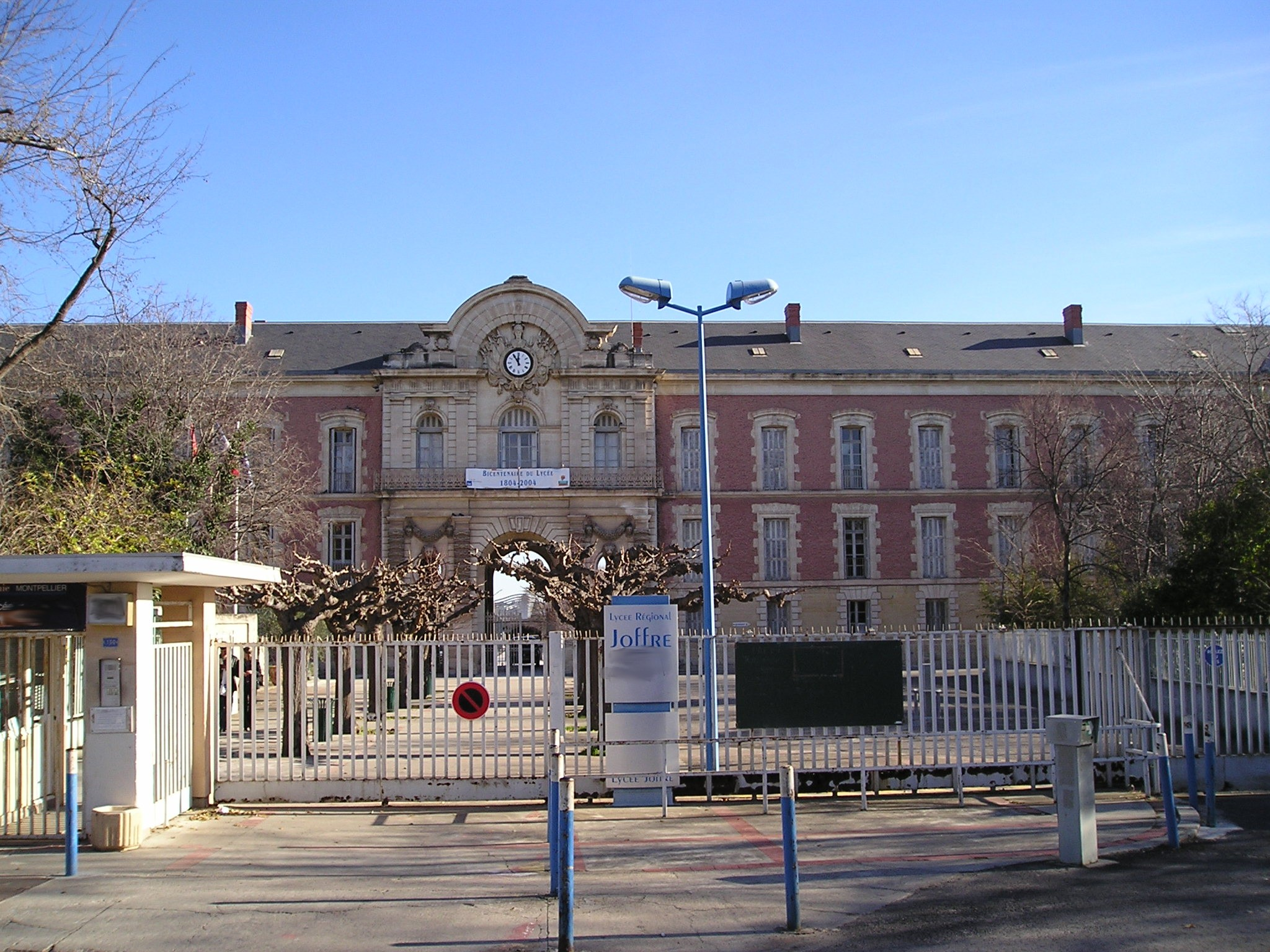
The entrance to the Lycée Joffre, in 2004

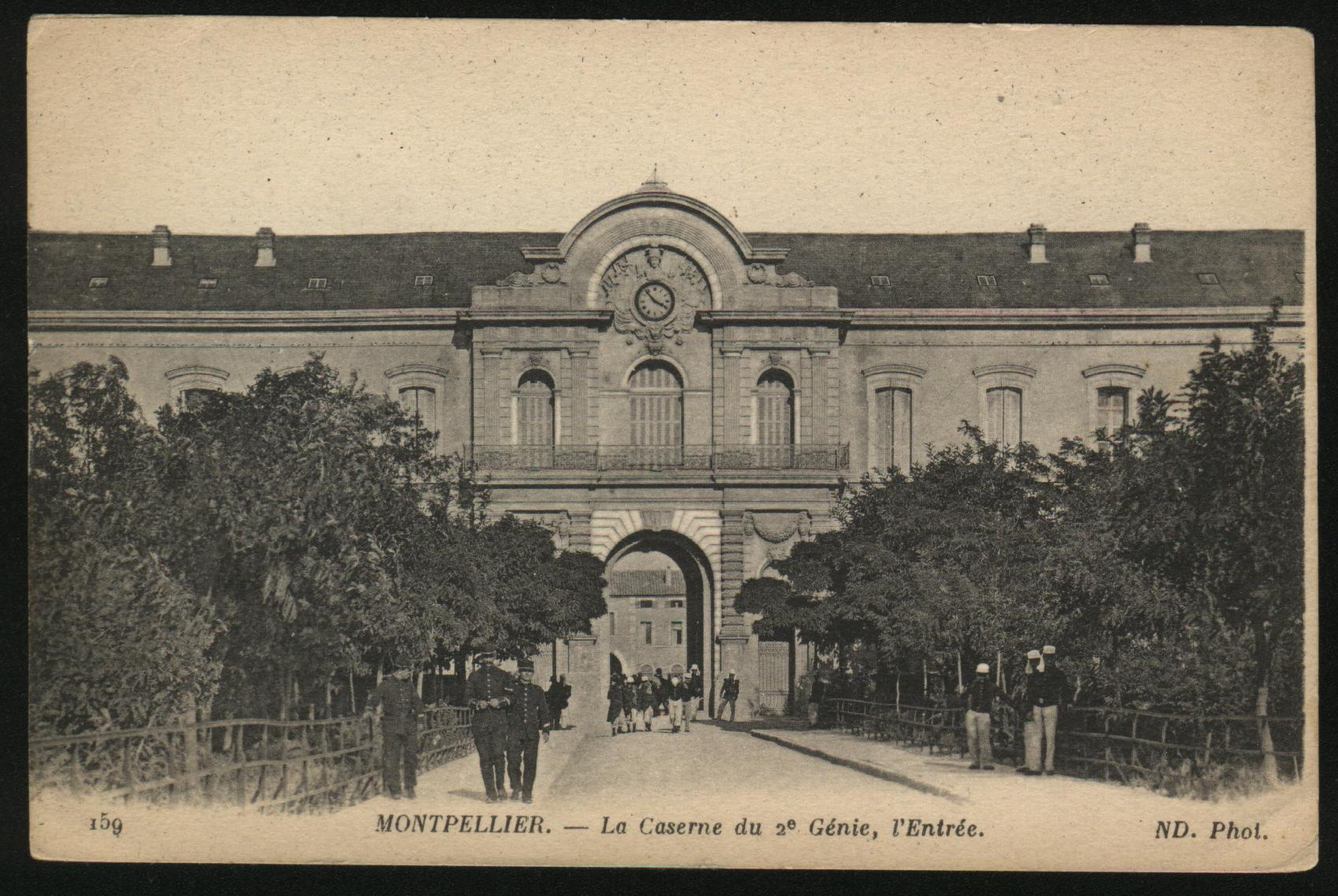
The entry to the Joffre Barracks, in 1914

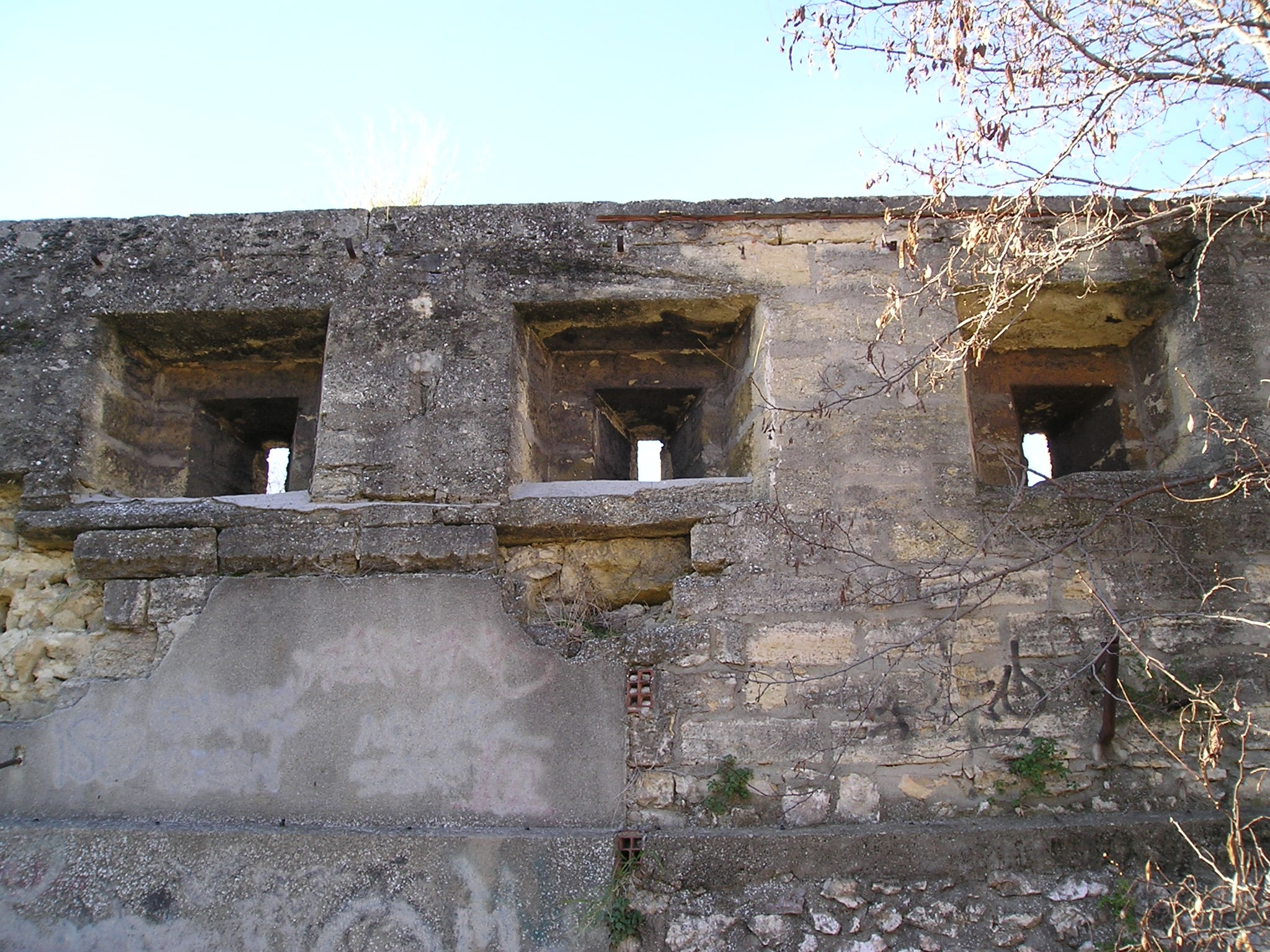
Embrasures, seen from inside the citadel

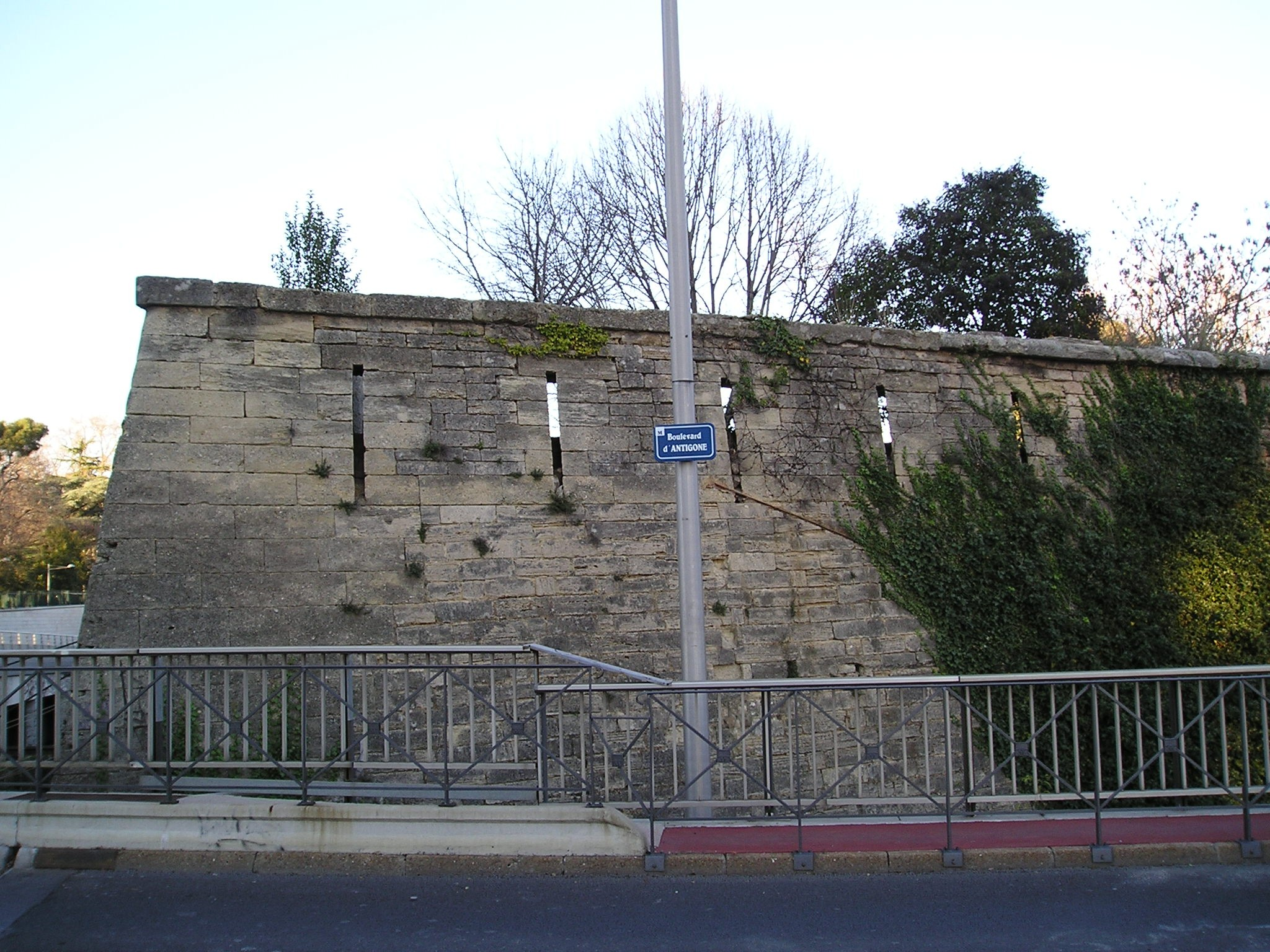
Embrasures, seen from outside the citadel

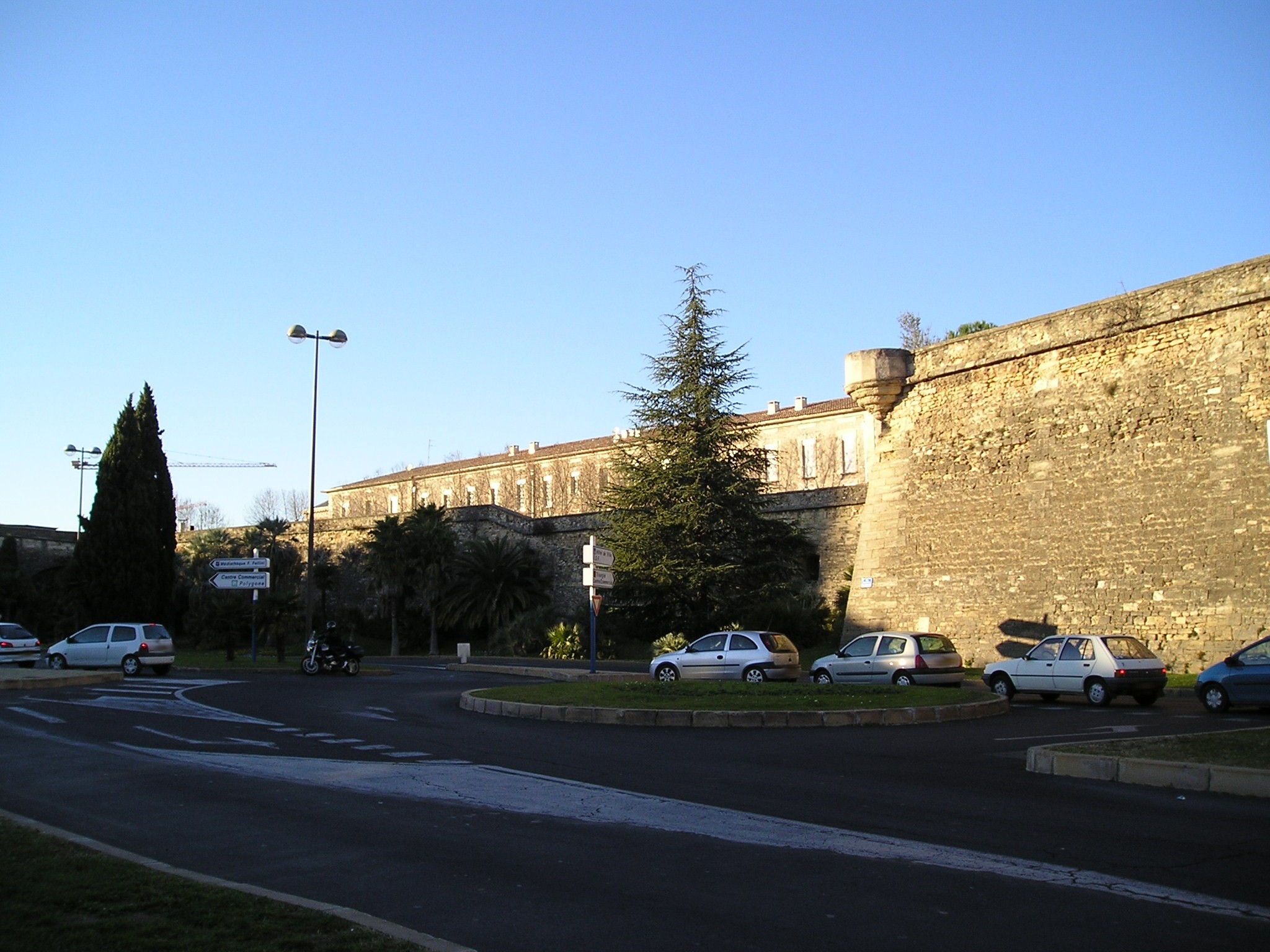
Southern wall, along the Allée Henri II de Montmorency
