= Henri Joyeux =

French scientist (born 1945)

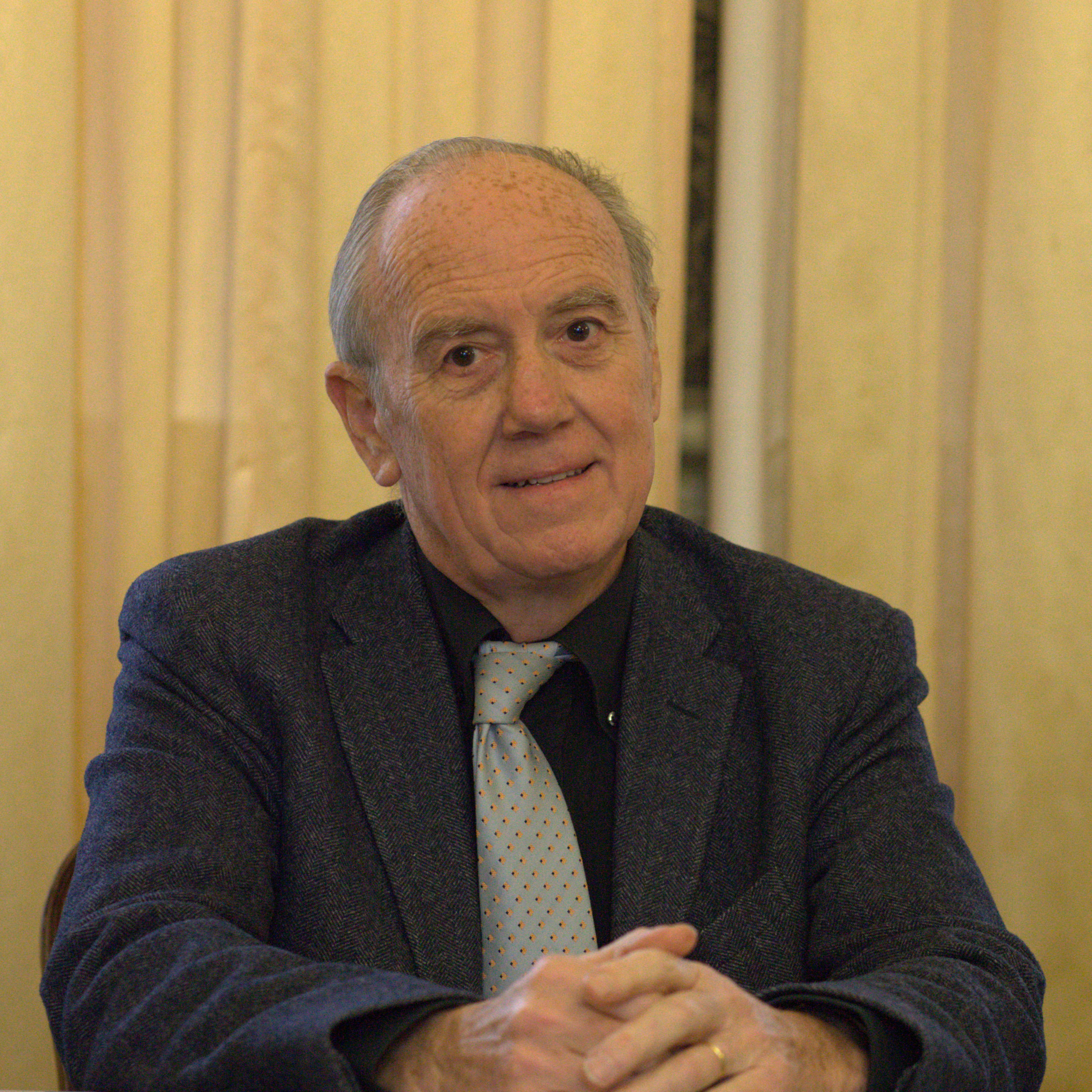
- Henri Joyeux in 2012
- Born: 28 June 1945 (age 81); Montpellier, France
- Education: University of Montpellier
- Occupation: Oncologist

Henri Joyeux (French pronunciation: [ɑ̃ʁi ʒwajø]; born 28 June 1945) is a French oncologic surgeon, nutrition specialist and writer.

== Biography ==
Following graduation from the University of Montpellier, Joyeux became a surgeon in general oncology in 1972, and a professor in digestive surgery and oncology. He worked at the Curie Institute of Paris from 1992 to 1997 and became a member of the New York Academy of Sciences in 1992. He wrote a number of general-interest books about health and nutrition.

In the year 2000, he began making appearances on television and delivering talks. He was a member of the French Economic, Social and Environmental Council from 2010 to 2015. His skeptical views on vaccination and on non-traditional families have made him a controversial figure.

== Education ==
Joyeux was born in Montpellier, where he studied medicine. He graduated from the University of Montpellier in 1972 with a PhD thesis on artificial gut with total parenteral nutrition.

== Medical career ==
In 1973, Joyeux became surgeon at the Regional Cancer Institute of Montpellier. He was also appointed director of the Laboratory of Nutrition and Experimental Oncology at the Cancer Institute of Montpellier in 1972. In 1980, he became professor of oncology at the University of Montpellier, and then professor of general surgery in 1986.

Joyeux was awarded the Antoine Lacassagne award in 1986 for his research on artificial nutrition and its therapeutic use in digestive track cancers. He joined the Curie Institute of Paris as head of the Visceral and Digestive Surgery Department in 1992 and became a member of the New York Academy of Sciences on the same year. Two years later, in 1994, he became a member of the French National Academy of Surgery.

In 2008, he was made Chevalier (Knight) of the Legion of Honour for "41 years of service in civil, military and associative activities".

He retired in 2014.

== Politics, society and publication ==
=== Political activity ===
Joyeux was elected as municipal councillor in Ornaisons, a small commune in the Aude department, in 1983. His term ended in 1989.

During the 1989 European Parliament election, he led a list named "L'Alliance" (center-right) which obtained 0.75% of the votes cast (136,230 votes).

=== Family ===
In 2001, he was elected as president of Familles de France, a family association. He held this position until 2013. During his term, he joined the National Union of Family Associations (UNAF) as vice-president. In 2013, he publicly opposed the bill allowing same-sex marriage and adoption for same-sex couples.

From 2010 to 2015, as vice-president of the UNAF, he was a member of the French Economic, Social and Environmental Council.

=== Health and nutrition ===
In 2001, Joyeux initiated the first "fruit pub" in a school with the intention of combating the influence of food advertising and its perceived promotion of poor dietary habits among children and young adolescents. The initiative sought to encourage students to opt for fruits over snacks and candies during breaks.

Joyeux wrote a number of books on nutrition and health. Many of his books were best-sellers, with Changez d’alimentation selling over 500,000 copies.

== Controversy ==
Joyeux is a vaccine sceptic, and warns against perceived dangers of vaccinations on Facebook.

In 2020 the French National Council of the Order of Physicians lodged a complaint against six health professionals, including Joyeux, over remarks they made regarding the effectiveness of COVID-19 vaccines.
