= Montpellier =

Montpellier Montpelhièr (Occitan)
- Prefecture and commune
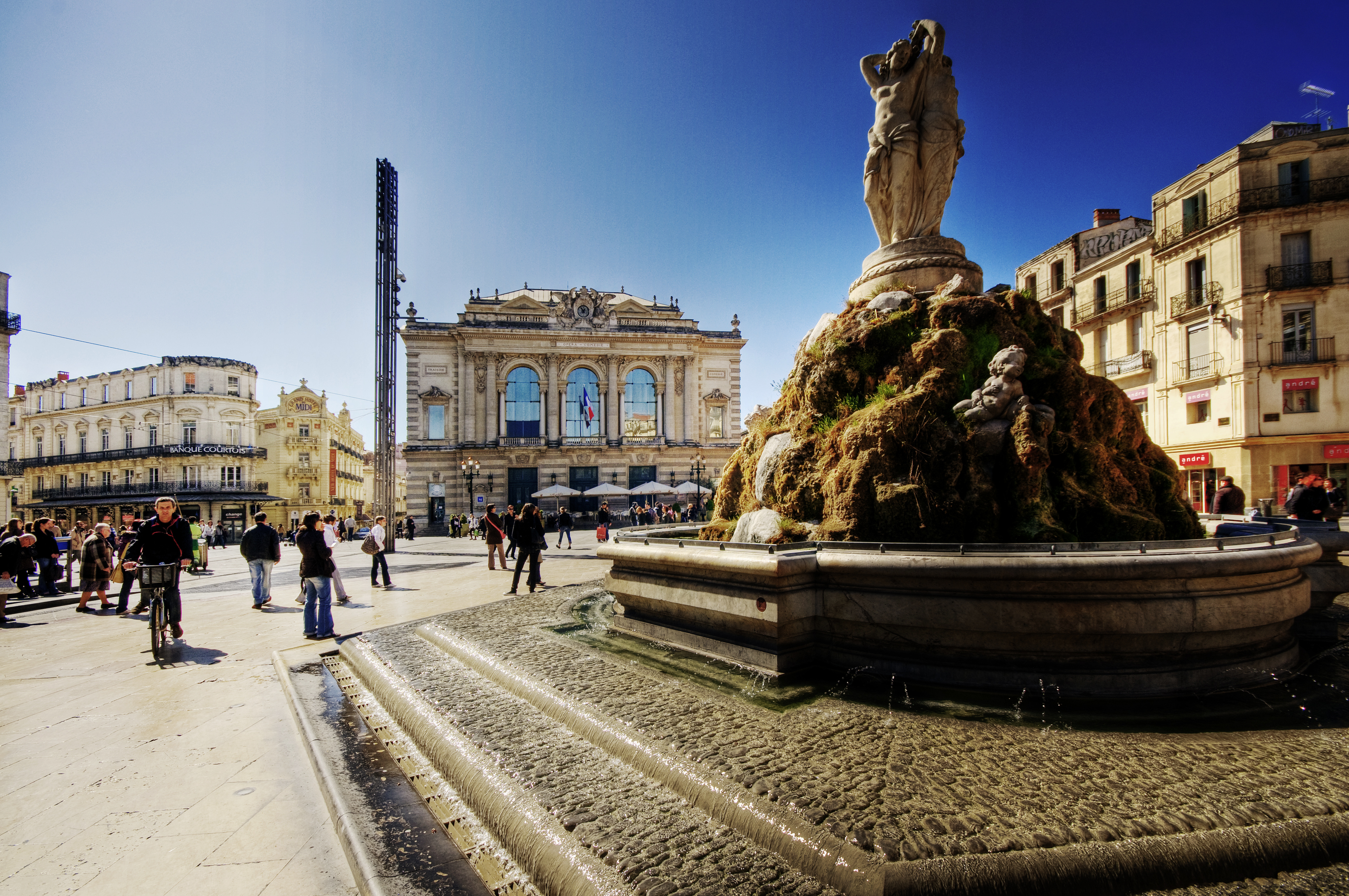
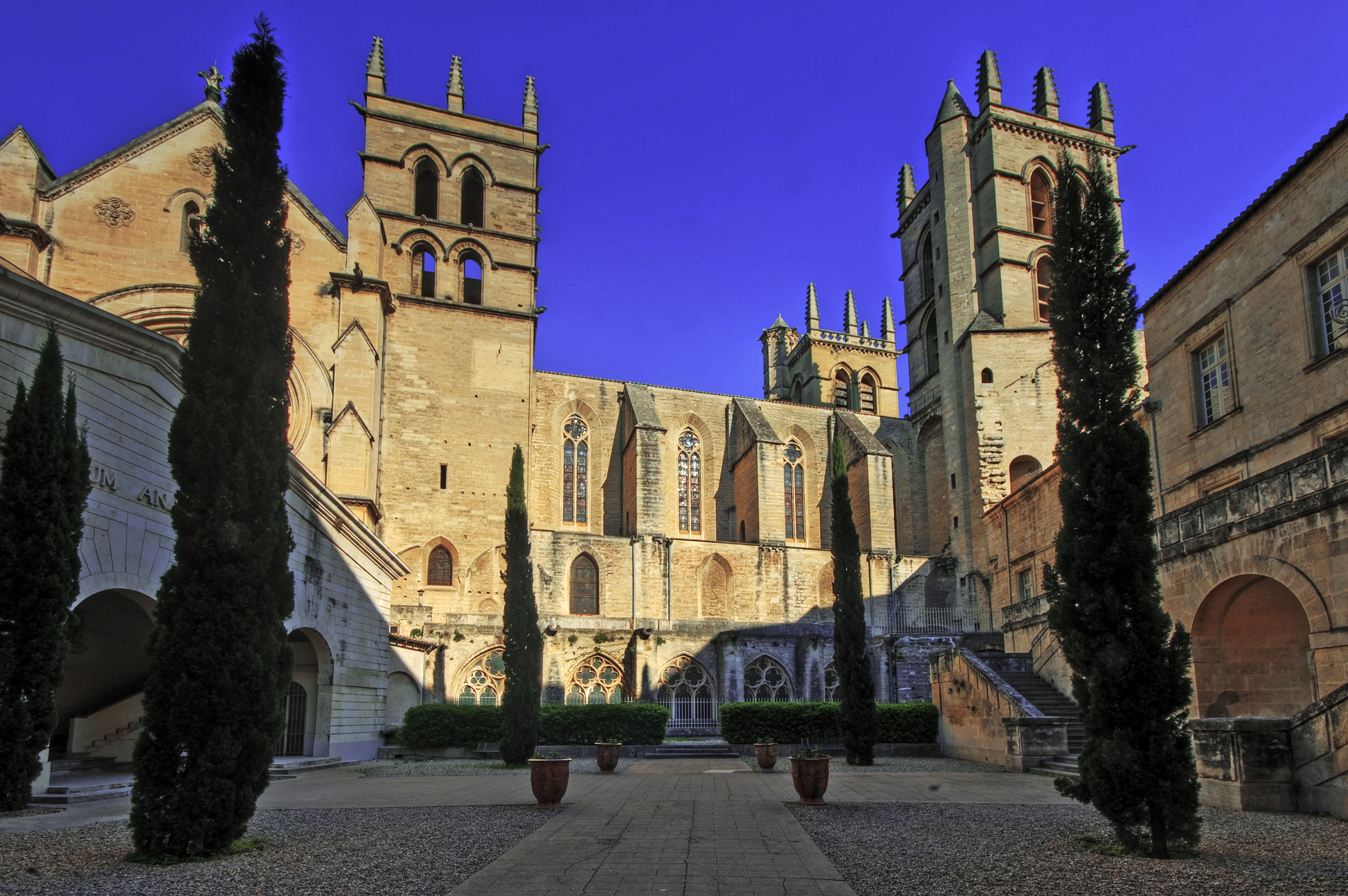
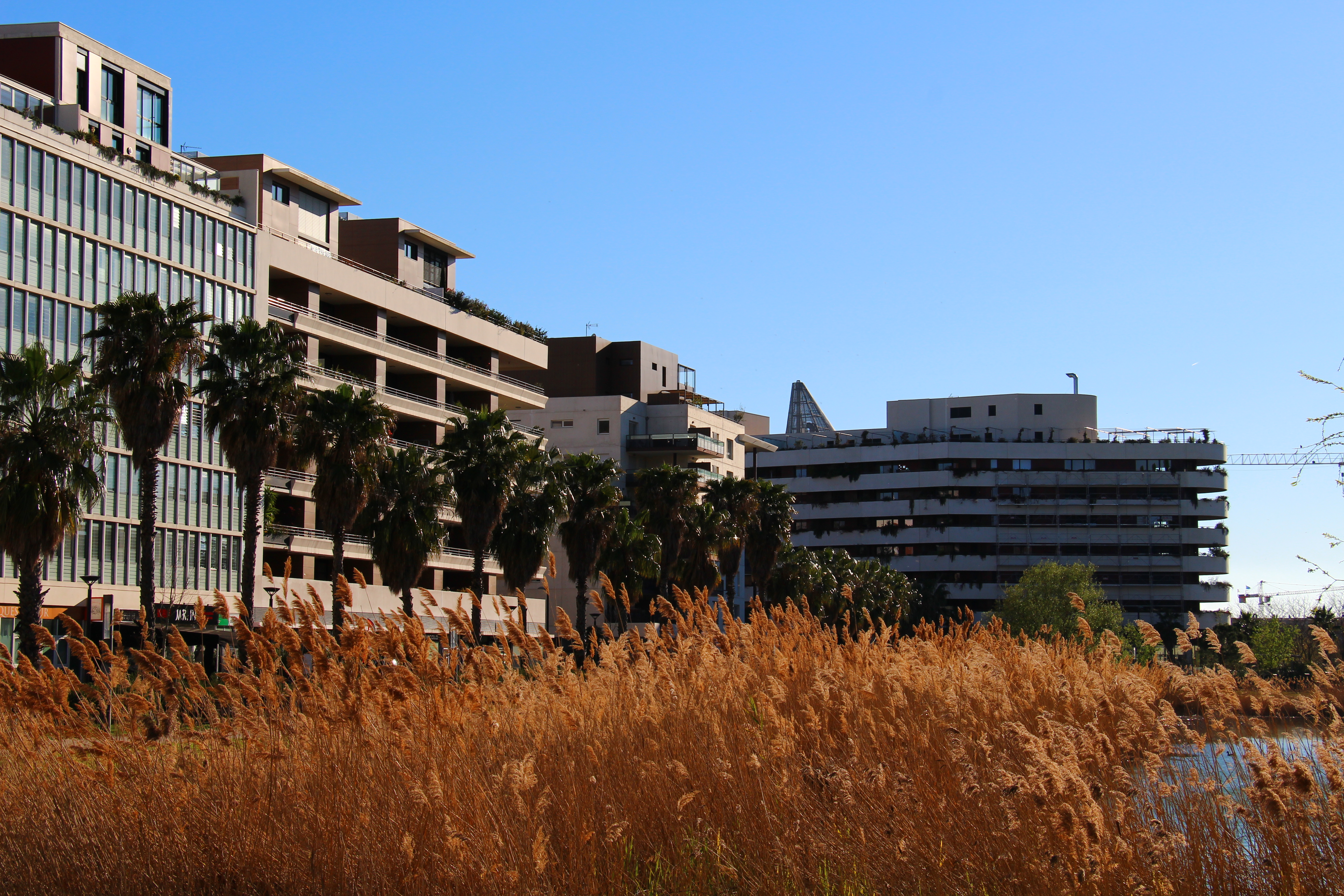
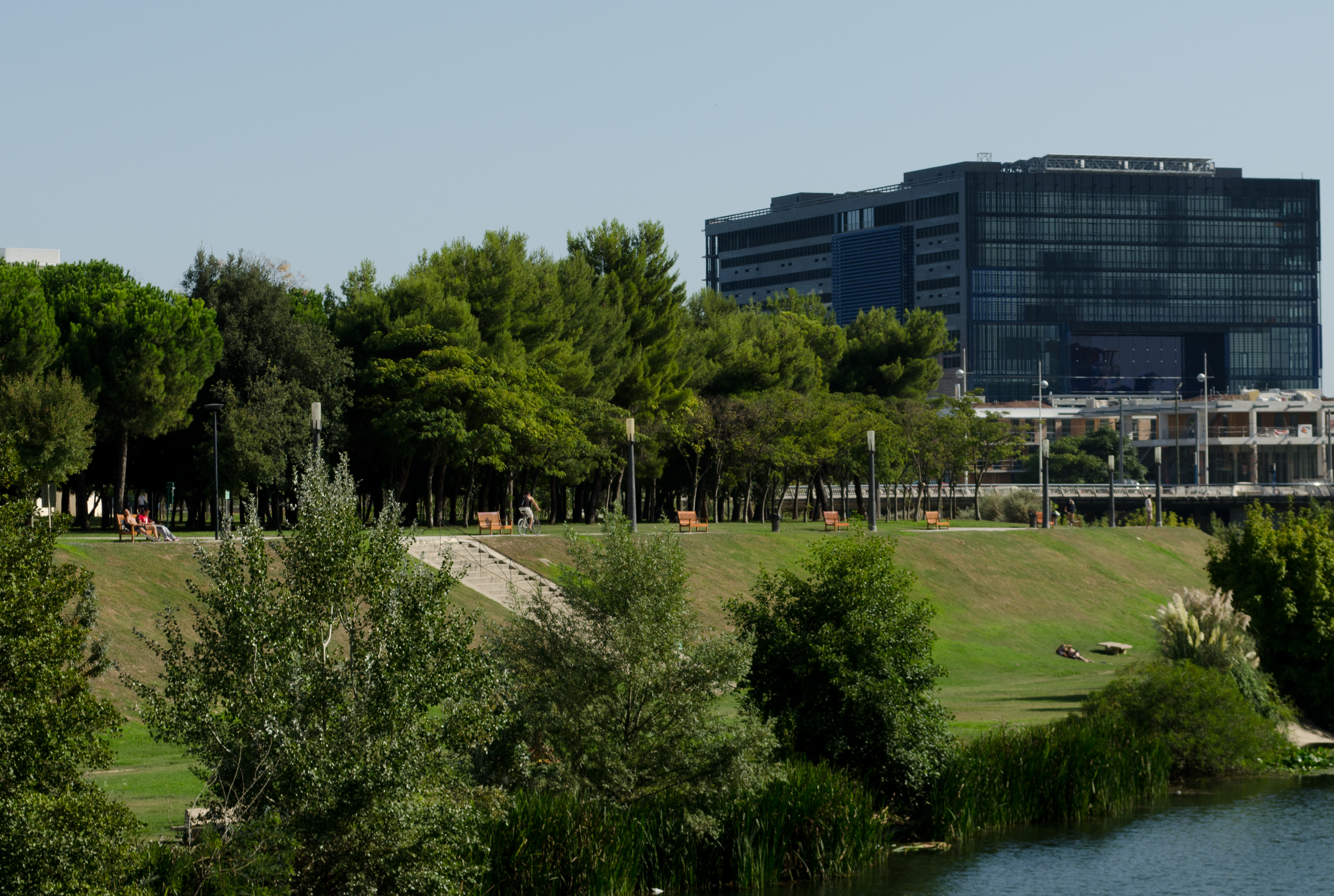
- Clockwise from top: The Place de la Comédie, Port Marianne's lake, the bank of the Lez with the Hôtel de Ville, and the Cathedral of Saint Peter.

- Flag Coat of arms
- Location of Montpellier
- Location within France Location within Occitanie
- Coordinates: 43°36′43″N 3°52′38″E
- Country: France
- Region: Occitania
- Department: Hérault
- Arrondissement: Montpellier
- Canton: Montpellier-1, 2, 3, 4, 5 and Montpellier – Castelnau-le-Lez
- Intercommunality: Montpellier Méditerranée Métropole

Government
  - Mayor (2026–32): Michaël Delafosse
- Area^{1}: 56.88 km^{2} (21.96 sq mi)
  - Urban (2020): 310.0 km^{2} (119.7 sq mi)
  - Metro (2020): 2,414 km^{2} (932 sq mi)
- Elevation: 27 m (89 ft)
- Highest elevation: 121 m (397 ft)
- Lowest elevation: 7 m (23 ft)
- Population (2023): 310,240
  - Rank: 7th in France
  - Density: 5,454/km^{2} (14,130/sq mi)
  - Urban (2023): 485,823
  - Urban density: 1,567/km^{2} (4,059/sq mi)
  - Metro (2023): 842,923
  - Metro density: 349.2/km^{2} (904.4/sq mi)
- Demonym(s): Montpelliérain (masculine); Montpelliéraine (feminine)
- Time zone: UTC+01:00 (CET)
  - Summer (DST): UTC+02:00 (CEST)
- INSEE/Postal code: 34172 /34000, 34070, 34080, 34090
- ^{1} French Land Register data, which excludes lakes, ponds, glaciers > 1 km^{2} (0.386 sq mi or 247 acres) and river estuaries.

Montpellier (UK: /mɒntˈpɛlieɪ/, US: /ˌmoʊnpɛlˈjeɪ/) (Note: French: [mɔ̃pəlje, -pɛl-]; Occitan: Montpelhièr [mumpeˈʎɛ]) is a city in southern France near the Mediterranean Sea. One of the largest urban centres in the region of Occitania, Montpellier is the prefecture of the department of Hérault. As of 2023, 310,240 people live in the city proper, while its metropolitan area has a population of 842,923. Montpellier is the third-largest French city near the Mediterranean coast, behind Marseille and Nice, and the seventh-largest city of France overall. The inhabitants are called Montpelliérains (masculine) and Montpelliéraines (feminine).

In the Middle Ages, Montpellier was an important city of the Crown of Aragon (and was the birthplace of James I), and then of Majorca, before its sale to France in 1349. Established in 1220, the University of Montpellier is one of the oldest universities in the world and has the oldest medical school still in operation, with notable alumni such as Petrarch, Nostradamus and François Rabelais. Above the medieval city, the ancient citadel of Montpellier is a stronghold built in the seventeenth century by Louis XIII.

Since the 1990s, Montpellier has experienced one of the strongest economic and demographic growths in the country. Its urban area has experienced the highest population growth in France since the year 2000. Numbering 70,000, students comprise nearly one-fourth of its population, one of the highest such proportions in Europe. Its living environment, with one of Europe's largest pedestrian areas, along with its rich cultural life and Mediterranean climate, explains the enthusiasm for the city, which is nicknamed the "Gifted". Montpellier was nominated for "Best Emerging Culture City of the Year 2017" by the think tank LCD. It is ranked as a Sufficiency city by the Globalization and World Cities Research Network.

== History ==
=== Medieval period ===
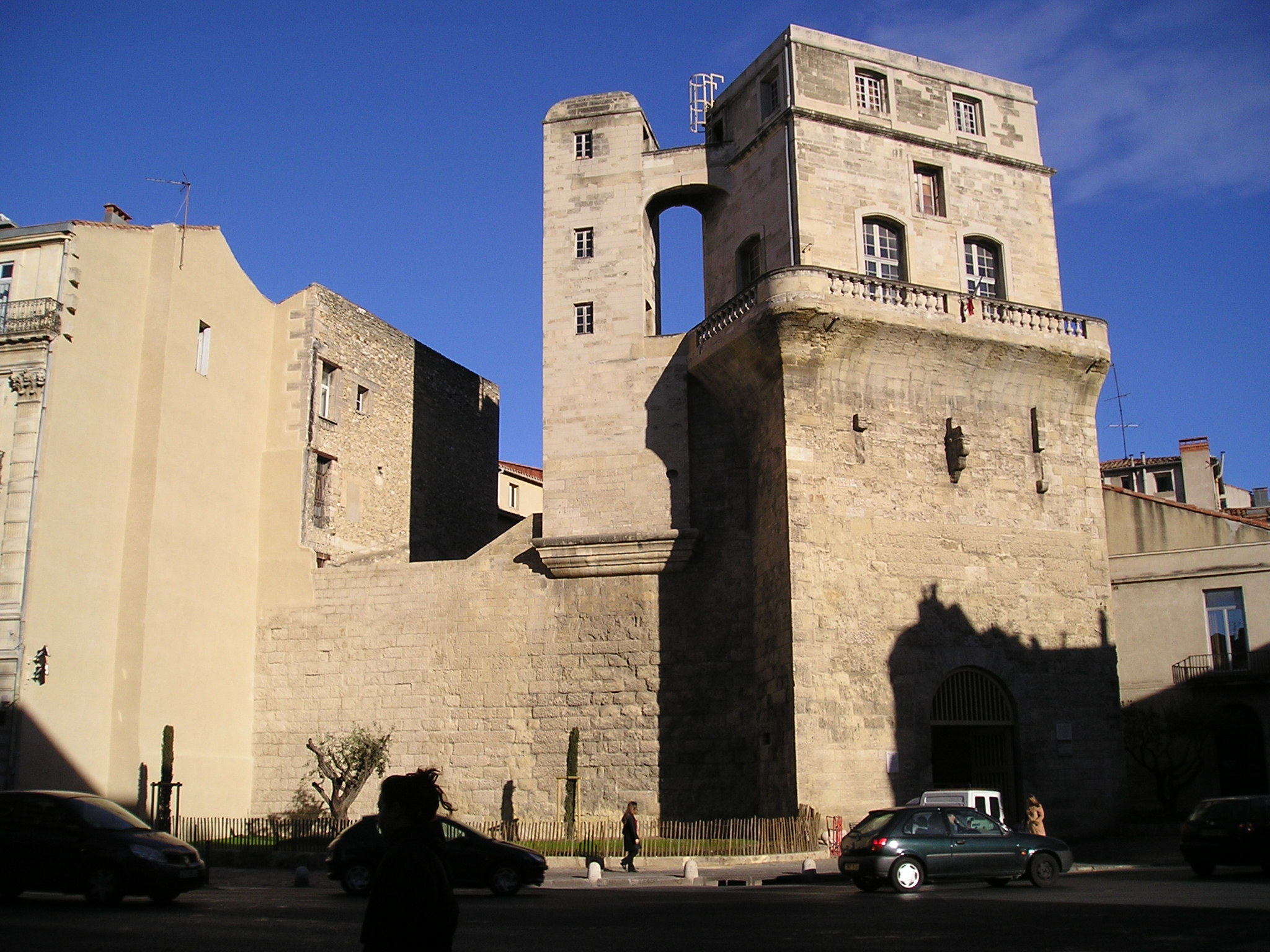
Tour de la Babote

In the Early Middle Ages, the nearby episcopal town of Maguelone was the major settlement in the area, but raids by pirates encouraged settlement a little farther inland. In 737 Charles Martel destroyed Maguelone.

Montpellier, first mentioned in a document of 985, was founded under a local feudal dynasty, the Guilhem, who combined two hamlets and built a castle and walls around the united settlement. The name is from medieval Latin mons pisleri, "Woad Mountain" referring to the woad (Latin pastellus, pestellus) used for dyeing locally. There is no real "mountain" in the area, with the mons referring to a pile of stones. In 986 the Lords of Montpellier begin with William I of Montpellier. In the 10th century the town consisted of two portions, Montpellier and Montpelliéret. In 1160 the law school was active.

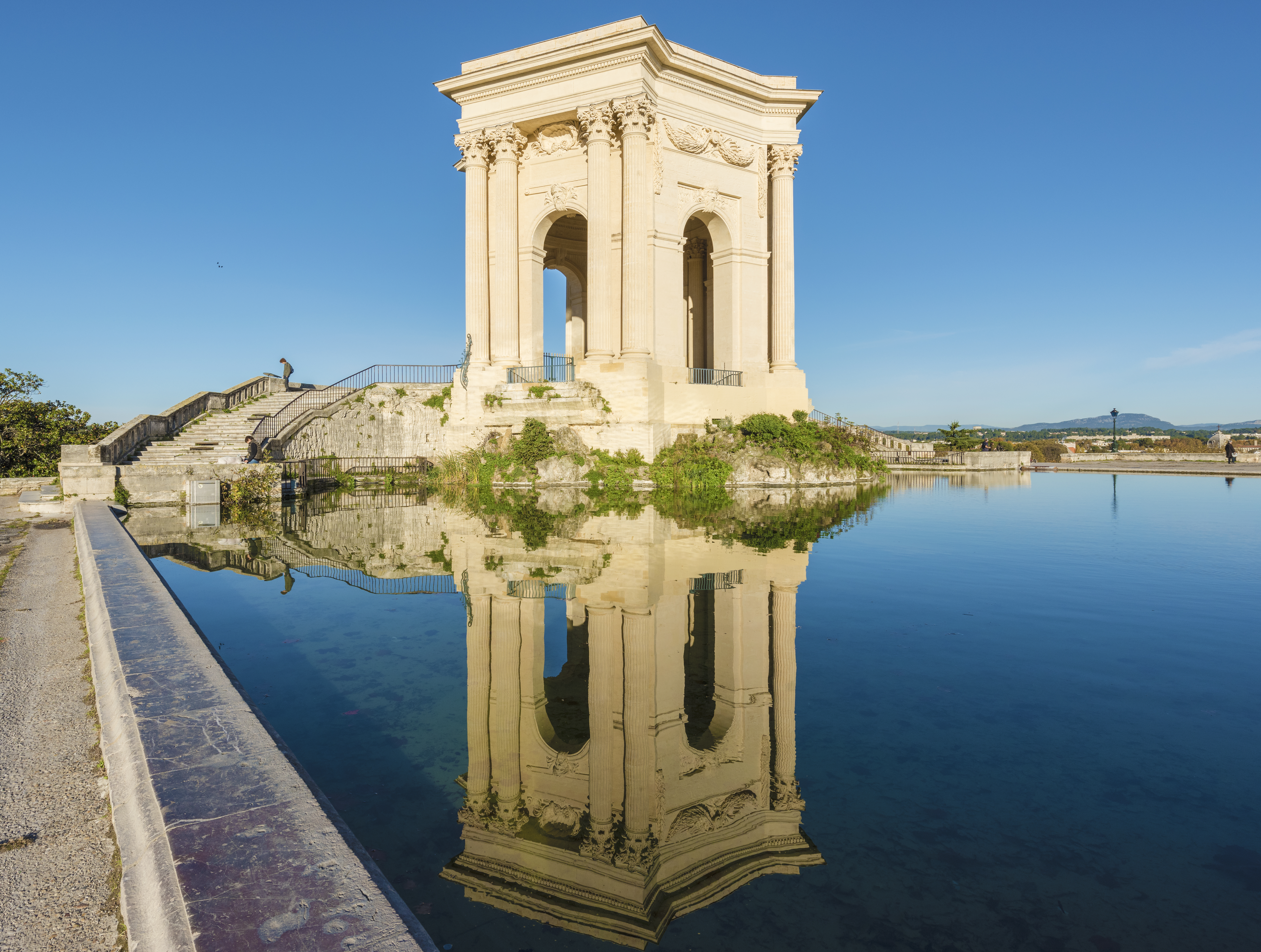
Peyrou water tower

The two surviving towers of the city walls, the Tour des Pins and the Tour de la Babotte, were built later, around the year 1200. Montpellier came to prominence in the 12th century—as a trading centre, with trading links across the Mediterranean world, and a rich Jewish cultural life that flourished within traditions of tolerance of Muslims, Jews and Cathars—and later of its Protestants. William VIII of Montpellier gave freedom for all to teach medicine in Montpellier in 1180. The city's faculties of law and medicine were established in 1220 by Cardinal Conrad of Urach, legate of Pope Honorius III; the medical faculty has, over the centuries, been one of the major centres for the teaching of medicine in Europe. This era marked the high point of Montpellier's prominence. The city became a possession of the Kings of Aragon in 1204 by the marriage of Peter II of Aragon with Marie of Montpellier, who was given the city and its dependencies as part of her dowry.

Montpellier gained a charter in 1204 when Peter and Marie confirmed the city's traditional freedoms and granted the city the right to choose twelve governing consuls annually. Under the Kings of Aragon, Montpellier became a very important city, a major economic centre and the primary centre for the spice trade in the Kingdom of France. It was the second or third most important city of France at that time, with some 40,000 inhabitants before the Black Death. Montpellier remained a possession of the crown of Aragon until it passed to James III of Majorca, who sold the city to the French king Philip VI in 1349, to raise funds for his ongoing struggle with Peter IV of Aragon.

From the middle of the 14th century until the French Revolution (1789), Montpellier was part of the province of Languedoc.

=== Renaissance ===
In the 14th century, Pope Urban VIII gave Montpellier a new monastery dedicated to Saint Peter, noteworthy for the very unusual porch of its chapel, supported by two high, somewhat rocket-like towers. With its importance steadily increasing, the city finally gained a bishop, who moved from Maguelone in 1536, and the huge monastery chapel became a cathedral. In 1432, Jacques Cœur established himself in the city and it became an important economic centre, until 1481 when Marseilles overshadowed it in this role.

=== After the Reformation ===
At the time of the Reformation in the 16th century, many of the inhabitants of Montpellier became Protestants (or Huguenots as they were known in France) and the city became a stronghold of Protestant resistance to the Catholic French crown. Montpellier was among the most important of the 66 villes de sûreté ('cities of protection' or 'protected cities') that the Edict of Nantes granted to the Huguenots. The city's political institutions and the university were all handed over to the Huguenots.

Increasing tension with Paris led to King Louis XIII besieging the city in 1622. A truce ended 40 days of bombardment on 12 October 1622, with the Huguenots agreeing to the peace settlement on 18 October. Peace terms called for the dismantling of the city's fortifications and the building of the royal Citadel of Montpellier to secure the city for the government. The university and consulate were taken over by the Catholic party. Even before the Edict of Alès in 1629, Protestant rule was dead and the ville de sûreté was no more.

Louis XIV made Montpellier capital of Bas Languedoc, and the town started to embellish itself, by building the Promenade du Peyrou, the Esplanade and a large number of houses in the historic centre.

=== French Revolution ===
After the French Revolution, the city became the capital of the much smaller Department of Hérault.

=== Modern history ===
During the 19th century the city thrived on the wine culture that it was able to produce due to the abundance of sun throughout the year. The wine consumption in France allowed Montpellier's citizens to become very wealthy until in the 1890s the phylloxera induced fungal disease had spread amongst the vineyards and the people were no longer able to grow the grapes needed for wine.

During the repression of January and February 1894, the police conducted raids targeting the anarchists living there, without much success.

After this the city grew because it welcomed French repatriates from Algeria and other parts of northern Africa after Algeria's independence from France. In the 21st century Montpellier is between France's number seventh and eighth largest city. The city had another influx in population more recently, largely due to the student population, who make up about one-fourth of Montpellier's population. The school of medicine kickstarted the city's thriving university culture, though many other universities have been well established there. The coastal city also benefited in the past 40 years from major construction programs such as Antigone, Port Marianne and Odysseum districts.

== Geography ==
The city is situated on hilly ground 10 km (6 mi) inland from the Mediterranean coast, on the river Lez.

Montpellier is located 170 km (106 mi) from Marseille, 242 km (150 mi) from Toulouse, and 748 km (465 mi) from Paris. The city is relatively close to Nîmes, being just 50 km (31 mi).

Montpellier's highest point is the Place du Peyrou, at an altitude of 57 m (187 ft). The city is built on two hills, Montpellier and Montpelliéret, thus some of its streets have great differences of altitude. Some of its streets are also very narrow and old, which gives it a more intimate feel.

=== Climate ===
Montpellier has a Mediterranean climate (Köppen Csa), with cool, damp winters, and hot, rather dry summers. The monthly mean ranges from 7.2 °C (45.0 °F) in January to 24.1 °C (75.4 °F) in July. Precipitation is around 630 millimetres (24.8 in), and is greatest in fall and winter, but not absent in summer, either. Extreme temperatures have ranged from −17.8 °C (−0.04 °F) recorded on 5 February 1963 and up to 43.5 °C (110.3 °F) on 28 June 2019.

Climate data for Montpellier (MPL), elevation: 1 m (3 ft), 1991–2020 normals, extremes 1946–present
Month	Jan	Feb	Mar	Apr	May	Jun	Jul	Aug	Sep	Oct	Nov	Dec	Year
Record high °C (°F)	21.2 (70.2)	23.6 (74.5)	27.4 (81.3)	30.4 (86.7)	35.1 (95.2)	43.5 (110.3)	37.6 (99.7)	37.7 (99.9)	36.3 (97.3)	31.8 (89.2)	27.1 (80.8)	22.0 (71.6)	43.5 (110.3)
Mean maximum °C (°F)	18.0 (64.4)	19.1 (66.4)	23.0 (73.4)	25.4 (77.7)	29.5 (85.1)	33.9 (93.0)	34.7 (94.5)	34.4 (93.9)	31.1 (88.0)	26.1 (79.0)	21.1 (70.0)	18.0 (64.4)	35.8 (96.4)
Mean daily maximum °C (°F)	12.0 (53.6)	13.1 (55.6)	16.4 (61.5)	18.7 (65.7)	22.6 (72.7)	26.9 (80.4)	29.5 (85.1)	29.3 (84.7)	25.2 (77.4)	20.7 (69.3)	15.7 (60.3)	12.5 (54.5)	20.2 (68.4)
Daily mean °C (°F)	7.6 (45.7)	8.3 (46.9)	11.4 (52.5)	13.9 (57.0)	17.8 (64.0)	21.8 (71.2)	24.4 (75.9)	24.1 (75.4)	20.2 (68.4)	16.4 (61.5)	11.6 (52.9)	8.3 (46.9)	15.5 (59.9)
Mean daily minimum °C (°F)	3.3 (37.9)	3.5 (38.3)	6.4 (43.5)	9.2 (48.6)	12.9 (55.2)	16.7 (62.1)	19.3 (66.7)	19.0 (66.2)	15.2 (59.4)	12.2 (54.0)	7.4 (45.3)	4.1 (39.4)	10.8 (51.4)
Mean minimum °C (°F)	−3.3 (26.1)	−2.8 (27.0)	0.2 (32.4)	4.1 (39.4)	7.7 (45.9)	12.1 (53.8)	15.3 (59.5)	14.4 (57.9)	9.9 (49.8)	5.1 (41.2)	0.1 (32.2)	−3.3 (26.1)	−5.1 (22.8)
Record low °C (°F)	−15.0 (5.0)	−17.8 (0.0)	−9.6 (14.7)	−1.7 (28.9)	0.6 (33.1)	5.4 (41.7)	8.4 (47.1)	8.2 (46.8)	3.8 (38.8)	−0.7 (30.7)	−5.0 (23.0)	−12.4 (9.7)	−17.8 (0.0)
Average precipitation mm (inches)	56.2 (2.21)	39.2 (1.54)	41.5 (1.63)	55.8 (2.20)	44.0 (1.73)	32.9 (1.30)	17.1 (0.67)	35.9 (1.41)	86.7 (3.41)	94.7 (3.73)	78.1 (3.07)	57.1 (2.25)	639.2 (25.17)
Average precipitation days (≥ 1.0 mm)	5.8	4.1	4.6	5.8	5.2	3.6	2.5	3.4	4.5	6.2	6.7	5.5	57.8
Average snowy days	0.7	0.4	0.1	0.0	0.0	0.0	0.0	0.0	0.0	0.0	0.1	0.2	1.5
Average relative humidity (%)	75	73	68	68	70	66	63	66	72	77	75	76	71
Mean monthly sunshine hours	145.6	170.1	218.8	228.6	271.4	315.7	344.8	305.1	246.6	175.5	145.7	137.4	2,705.2
Source 1: Météo France (snow 1981–2010)
Source 2: Infoclimat (humidity 1961–1990, annual extremes 1991–2020)

== Neighbourhoods ==
Since 2001, Montpellier has been divided into seven official neighbourhoods, themselves divided into sub-neighbourhoods. Each of them possesses a neighbourhood council.

- Montpellier-centre: historical centre (Écusson), Comédie, Gares, Faubourg Boutonnet, Saint-Charles, Faubourg Saint-Jaume, Peyrou, Les Arceaux, Figuerolles, Faubourg du Courreau, Gambetta, Clémenceau, Méditerranée, boulevard de Strasbourg, Le Triangle, Polygone, Antigone, Nouveau-Monde, Parc à Ballons, Les Aubes, Les Beaux-Arts, Saint-Lazare.
- Croix-d'Argent: avenue de Toulouse, Croix d'Argent, Mas Drevon, Tastavin, Lemasson, Garosud, Mas de Bagnères, Mas Nouguier, les Sabines, Lepic, Pas du Loup, Estanove, les Bouisses, Val-de-Crozes, Bagatelle.
- Les Cévennes: Les Cévennes, Alco, Le Petit Bard, Pergola, Saint-Clément, Clémentville, Las Rebès, La Chamberte, La Martelle, Montpellier-Village, Les Grisettes, Les Grèzes.
- Mosson: La Mosson, Celleneuve, La Paillade, les Hauts-de-Massane, Le Grand-Mail, Les Tritons.
- Hôpitaux-Facultés: Malbosc, Saint-Priest, Euromédecine, Zolad, Plan des 4 Seigneurs, Hôpitaux, IUT, Père Soulas, Universités, Vert-Bois, Hauts de Boutonnet, Aiguelongue, Justice, Parc zoologique de Lunaret, Agropolis.
- Port-Marianne: La Pompignane, Richter, Millénaire, Jacques Cœur, Consuls de Mer, Grammont, Odysseum, Montaubérou, La Méjanelle, Cambacérès.
- Prés d'Arènes: Les Prés d'Arènes, Avenue de Palavas, La Rauze, Tournezy, Saint-Martin, Les Aiguerelles, Pont-Trinquat, Cité Mion.

== Demographics ==
The whole metropolitan area had a population of 813,272 at the 2020 census. In a study made by INSEE from 2017 to 2023 Montpellier saw the strongest population growth of France's cities with more than 100,000 inhabitants (+1.4%). For most of its history, and even today, Montpellier has been known for its significant Spanish population, heritage and influence. Montpellier also houses significant Moroccan, Algerian, and Italian communities.

Historical population

Year	Pop.	±% p.a.
1793	32,897	—
1800	32,723	−0.08%
1806	33,264	+0.27%
1821	35,123	+0.36%
1831	36,029	+0.26%
1836	35,506	−0.29%
1841	40,746	+2.79%
1846	45,828	+2.38%
1851	45,811	−0.01%
1856	49,737	+1.66%
1861	51,865	+0.84%
1866	55,606	+1.40%
1872	57,727	+0.63%
1876	55,258	−1.09%
1881	56,005	+0.27%
1886	56,765	+0.27%
1891	69,258	+4.06%
1896	73,931	+1.31%
1901	75,950	+0.54%

Year	Pop.	±% p.a.
1906	77,114	+0.30%
1911	80,230	+0.80%
1921	81,548	+0.16%
1926	82,819	+0.31%
1931	86,924	+0.97%
1936	90,787	+0.87%
1946	93,102	+0.25%
1954	97,501	+0.58%
1962	118,864	+2.51%
1968	161,910	+5.29%
1975	191,354	+2.42%
1982	197,231	+0.43%
1990	207,996	+0.67%
1999	225,392	+0.90%
2007	253,712	+1.49%
2012	268,456	+1.14%
2017	285,121	+1.21%
2023	310,240	+1.42%

Source: EHESS and INSEE (since 1968)

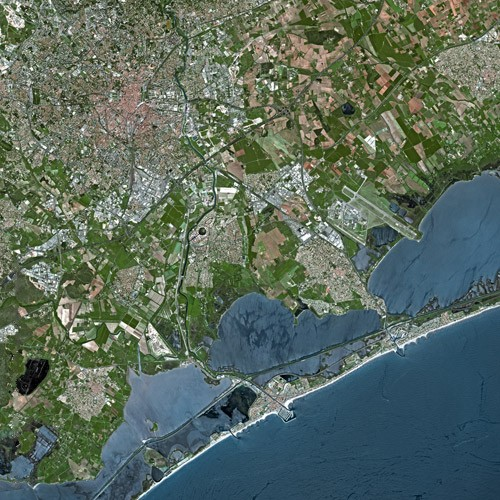
Montpellier seen from Spot satellite

== Heraldry ==
Arms of Montpellier	The arms of Montpellier are blazoned: Azure, a madonna proper, vested gules and azure, sitting on an antique throne Or, holding a Baby Jesus proper vested azure, in chief the uncial letters A and M, and in base on an inescutcheon argent a torteau (gules). The virgin is "Notre Dame des Tables", named for the money changing tables at the Basilica of Notre-Dame des Tables. The A and M are for "Ave Maria". The inescutcheon is the arms of the Lords of Montpellier (Guilhem).

== Sights ==
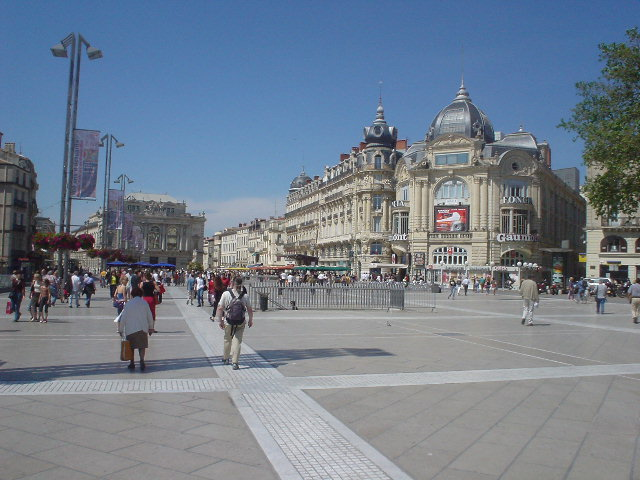
Place de la Comédie

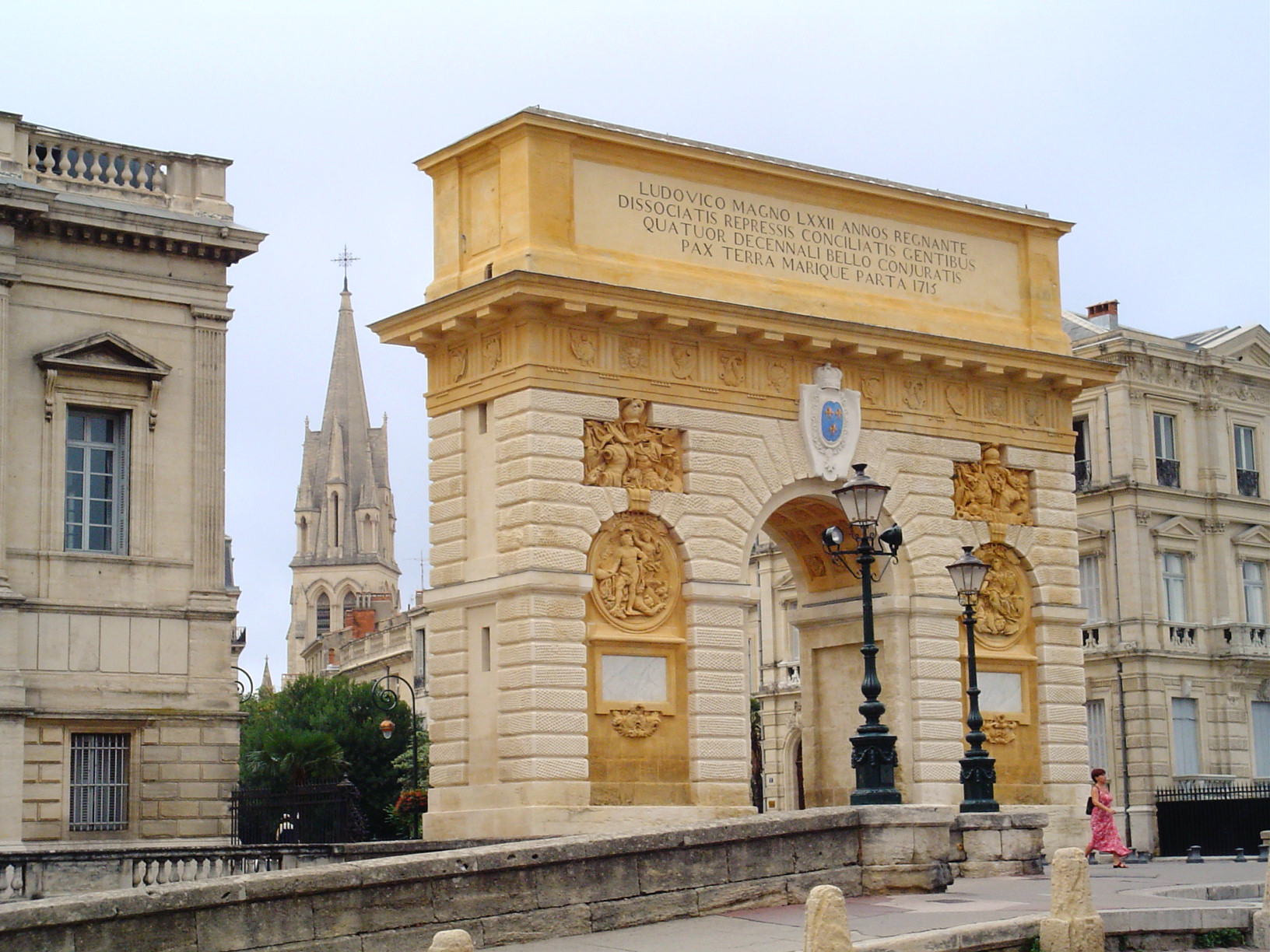
Porte du Peyrou

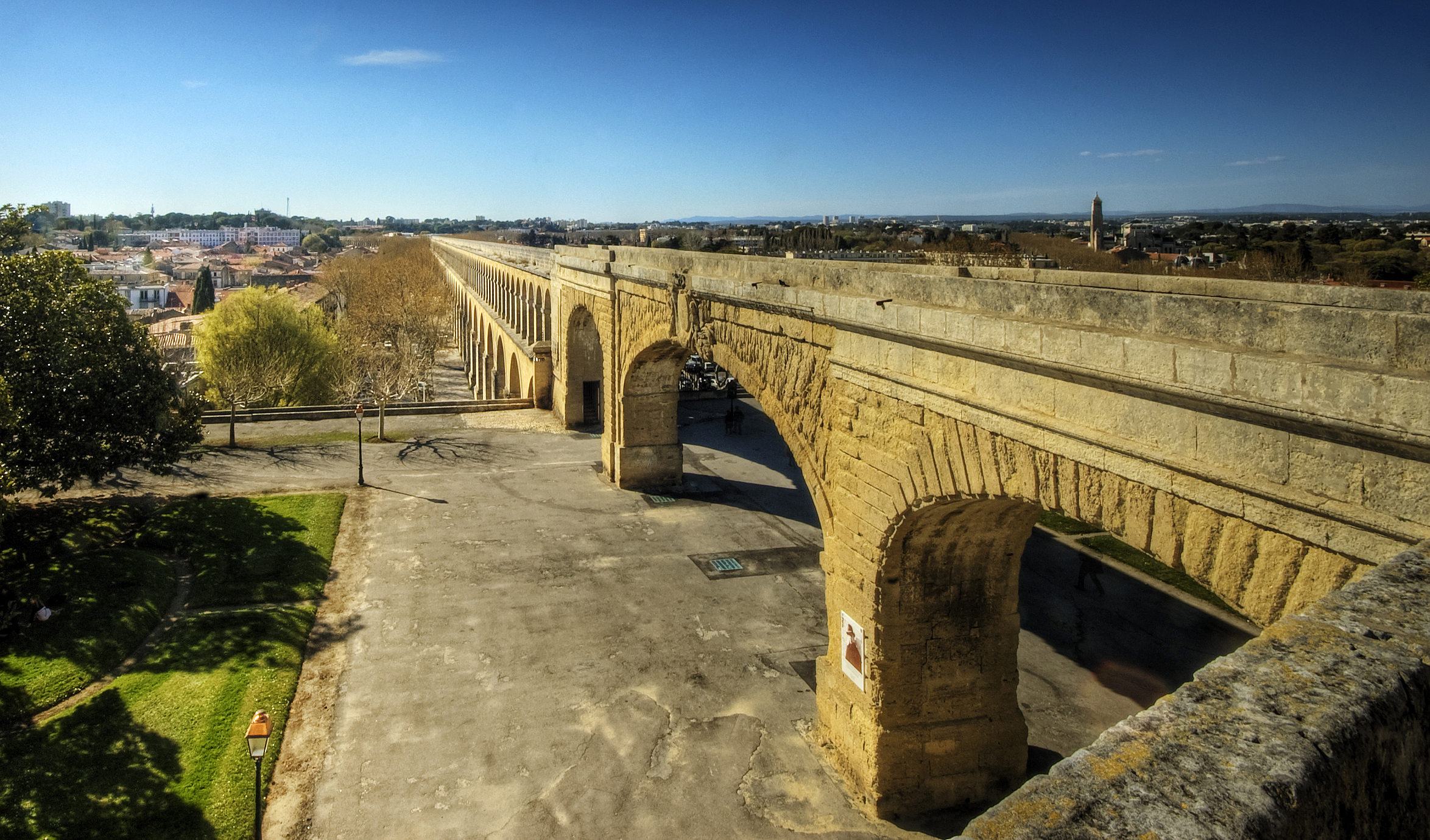
Saint Clément Aqueduct

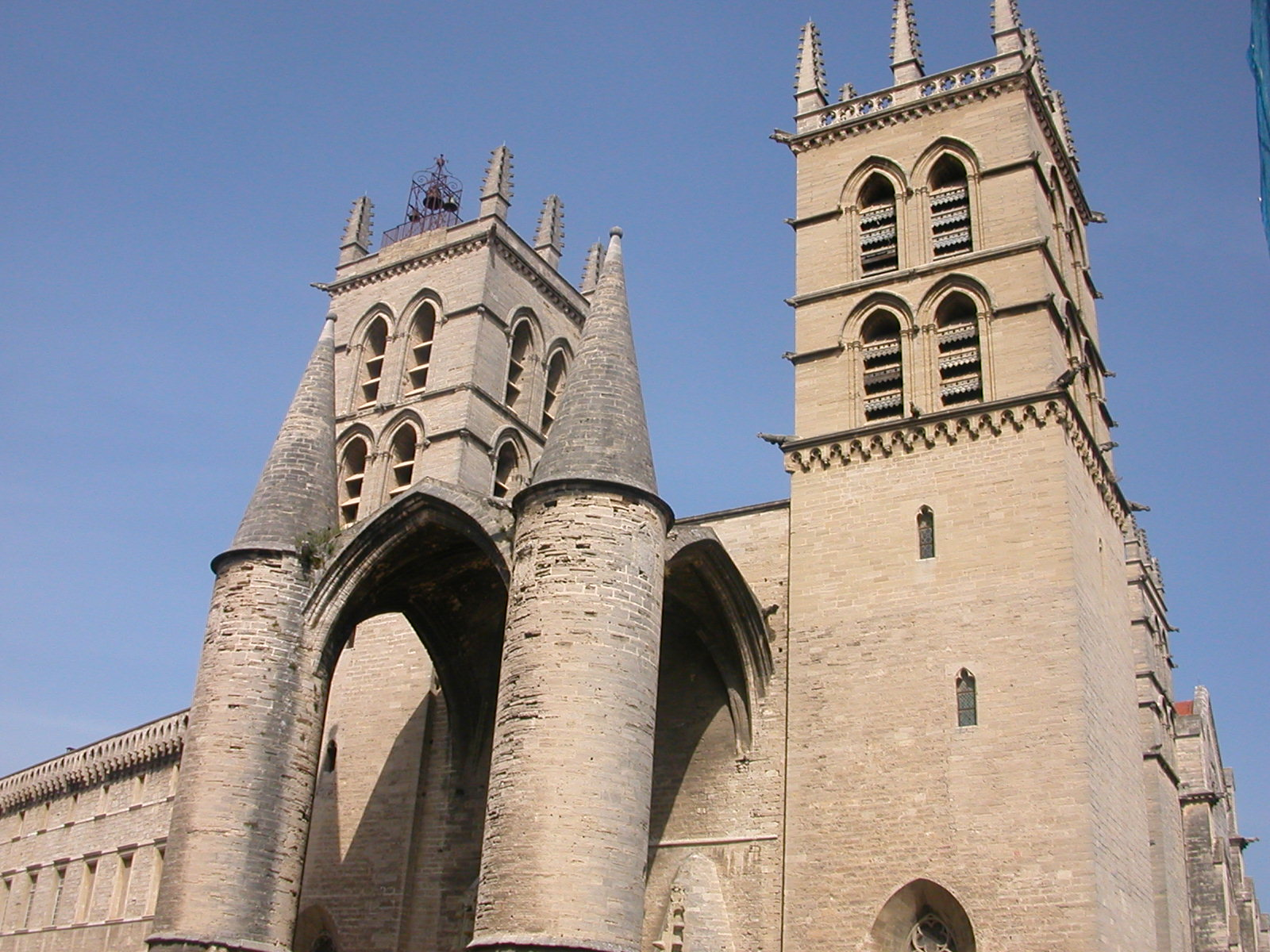
Saint Pierre Cathedral

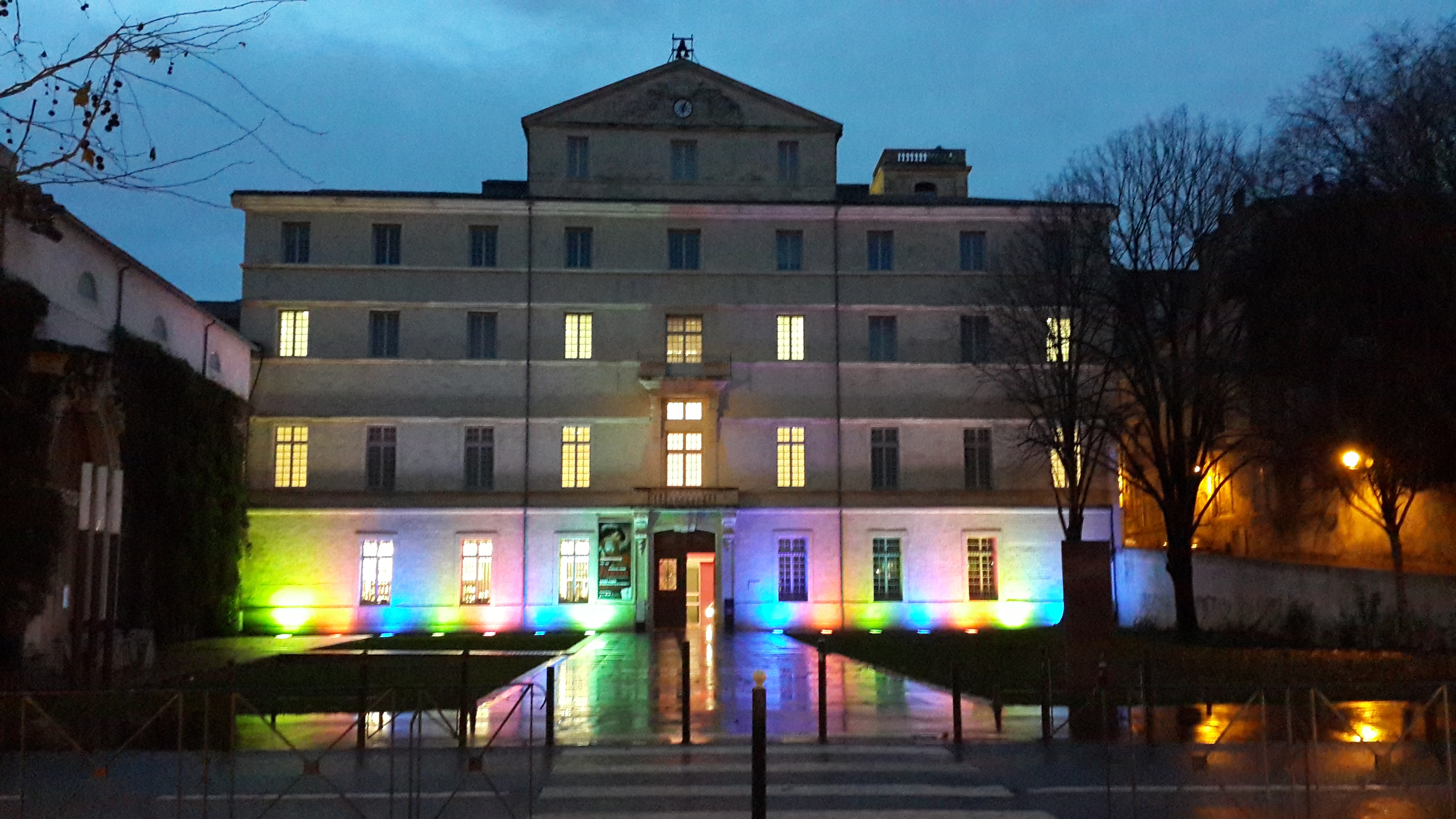
Fabre Museum in Montpellier

- The main focus point of the city is the Place de la Comédie, with the Opéra Comédie built in 1888.
- The Musée Fabre.
- In the historic centre, a significant number of hôtels particuliers (i.e. mansions) can be found. The majority of the buildings of the historic centre of Montpellier (called the Écusson because its shape is roughly that of an escutcheon) have medieval roots and were modified between the 16th and the 18th centuries. Some buildings, along Rue Foch and the Place de la Comédie, were built in the 19th century.
- The Rue du Bras de Fer (Iron Arm Street) is very typical of the medieval Montpellier.
- The mikve, ritual Jewish bath, dates back to the 12th century and is one of very few old mikves preserved in Europe.
- The Jardin des plantes de Montpellier—oldest botanical garden in France, founded in 1593.
- The La Serre Amazonienne, a tropical rain forest greenhouse
- The 14th-century Saint Pierre Cathedral
- The Porte du Peyrou, a triumphal arch built at the end of the 17th century, and the Place Royal du Peyrou built in the 17th century, are the highest point of the Ecusson.
- The Tour des Pins, the only remaining of 25 towers of the medieval city walls, built around 1200.
- The Tour de la Babote, a medieval tower which was modified in the 18th century to house an observatory.
- The Saint Clément Aqueduct, built in the 18th century.
- The Antigone District was designed by the postmodern architect Ricardo Bofill from Catalonia, Spain
- A number of châteaux (such as Château de Flaugergues, Château de la Mogère or Château d'O), so-called follies, built during the 18th century by wealthy merchants surround the city
- Montpellier City Council is based at the Hôtel de Ville, completed in 2011.
- Nearly 80 private mansions were built in the city center from the 17th to 19th century, and some of their interior courtyards are open
- Montpellier Zoological Park - 80 hectare zoo based in the commune.

== Education ==
=== History ===
The University of Montpellier is one of the oldest in the world, founded in 1160, and having been granted a charter in 1220 by Cardinal Conrad von Urach and confirmed by Pope Nicholas IV in a papal bull of 1289. It was suppressed during the French Revolution but was re-established in 1896.

It is not known exactly at what date the schools of literature were founded which developed into the Montpellier faculty of arts; it may be that they were a direct continuation of the Gallo-Roman schools. The school of law was founded by Placentinus, a doctor from Bologna University, who came to Montpellier in 1160, taught there during two different periods, and died there in 1192. With regard to the school of medicine, there were excellent physicians at Montpellier. The statutes given in 1220 by Cardinal Conrad, legate of Honorius III, which were completed in 1240 by Pierre de Conques, placed this school under the direction of the Bishop of Maguelonne. Pope Nicholas IV issued a Bull in 1289, combining all the schools into a university, which was placed under the direction of the bishop, but which in fact enjoyed a large measure of autonomy.

Theology was at first taught in the convents, in which St. Anthony of Padua, Raymond Lullus, and the Dominican Bernard de la Treille lectured. Two letters of King John prove that a faculty of theology existed at Montpellier independently of the convents, in January 1350. By a Bull of 17 December 1421, Martin V granted canonical institution to this faculty and united it closely with the faculty of law. In the 16th century the faculty of theology disappeared for a time, when Calvinism, in the reign of Henry II of France, held complete possession of the city. It resumed its functions after Louis XIII had reestablished the royal power at Montpellier in 1622; but the rivalries of Dominicans and Jesuits interfered seriously with the prosperity of the faculty, which disappeared at the Revolution. The faculty numbered among its illustrious pupils of law Petrarch, who spent four years at Montpellier, and among its lecturers Guillaume de Nogaret, chancellor to Philip the Fair, Guillaume de Grimoard, afterwards pope under the name of Urban V, and Pedro de Luna, antipope as Benedict XIII. But after the 15th century this faculty fell into decay, as did also the faculty of arts, although for a time, under Henry IV of France, the latter faculty had among its lecturers Isaac Casaubon.

The Montpellier school of medicine owed its success to the ruling of the Guilhems, lords of the town, by which any licensed physician might lecture there; there was no fixed limit to the number of teachers, lectures were multiplied, and there was a great wealth of teaching. Rabelais took his medical degrees at Montpellier. It was in this school that the biological theory of vitalism, elaborated by Barthez (1734–1806), had its origin. The French Revolution did not interrupt the existence of the faculty of medicine.

The faculties of science and of letters were re-established in 1810; that of law in 1880. It was on the occasion of the sixth centenary of the university, celebrated in 1889, that the Government of France announced its intention—which has since been realized—of reorganizing the provincial universities in France.

=== Universities ===
There are about 70,000 students in the city's universities and other schools.

- University of Montpellier: sciences, medicine, dentistry, pharmacy, law, business, sports
- Paul Valéry University: arts, languages and social sciences

University of Montpellier 1 and University of Montpellier 2 reunified in January 2015 to form the University of Montpellier. Paul Valéry University Montpellier, remains a separate entity.

Moreover, Montpellier was ranked 137th best student city in the world for 2026, according to QS Best Student Cities 2025 ranking.

=== Grandes Ecoles ===
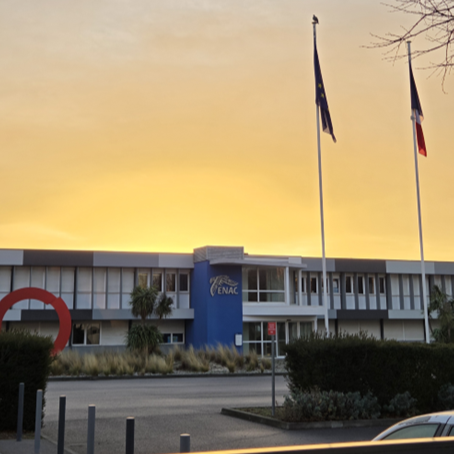
École nationale de l'aviation civile

Public service schools

- École nationale de la concurrence, de la consommation et de la répression des fraudes (ENCCRF): National School for Competition, Consumer Affairs and Fraud Control

Science

- E-Artsup
- École Polytechnique Universitaire de Montpellier (Polytech)
- National Superior Architecture School of Montpellier (ENSAM)
- École nationale de l'aviation civile
- ENSCM: chemistry
- École pour l'informatique et les nouvelles technologies
- Institut supérieur européen de formation par l'action
- Montpellier SupAgro: agronomy
- SUPINFO International University: private institution of higher education in general computer science

Business

- Montpellier Business School
- SupExup Higher Education Institute

== Transport ==
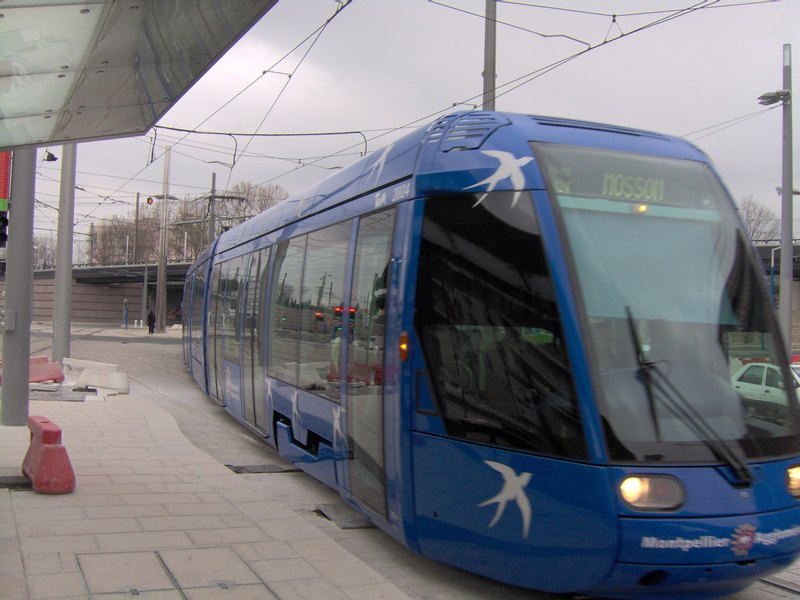
Line 1 of the tramway network, at the Corum stop

Montpellier is served by railway, including TGV highspeed trains. Montpellier's main railway station is Saint-Roch. Since 2018, there is also a station on the high-speed railway linking Nîmes and Montpellier with the LGV Méditerranée, called Montpellier-Sud de France.

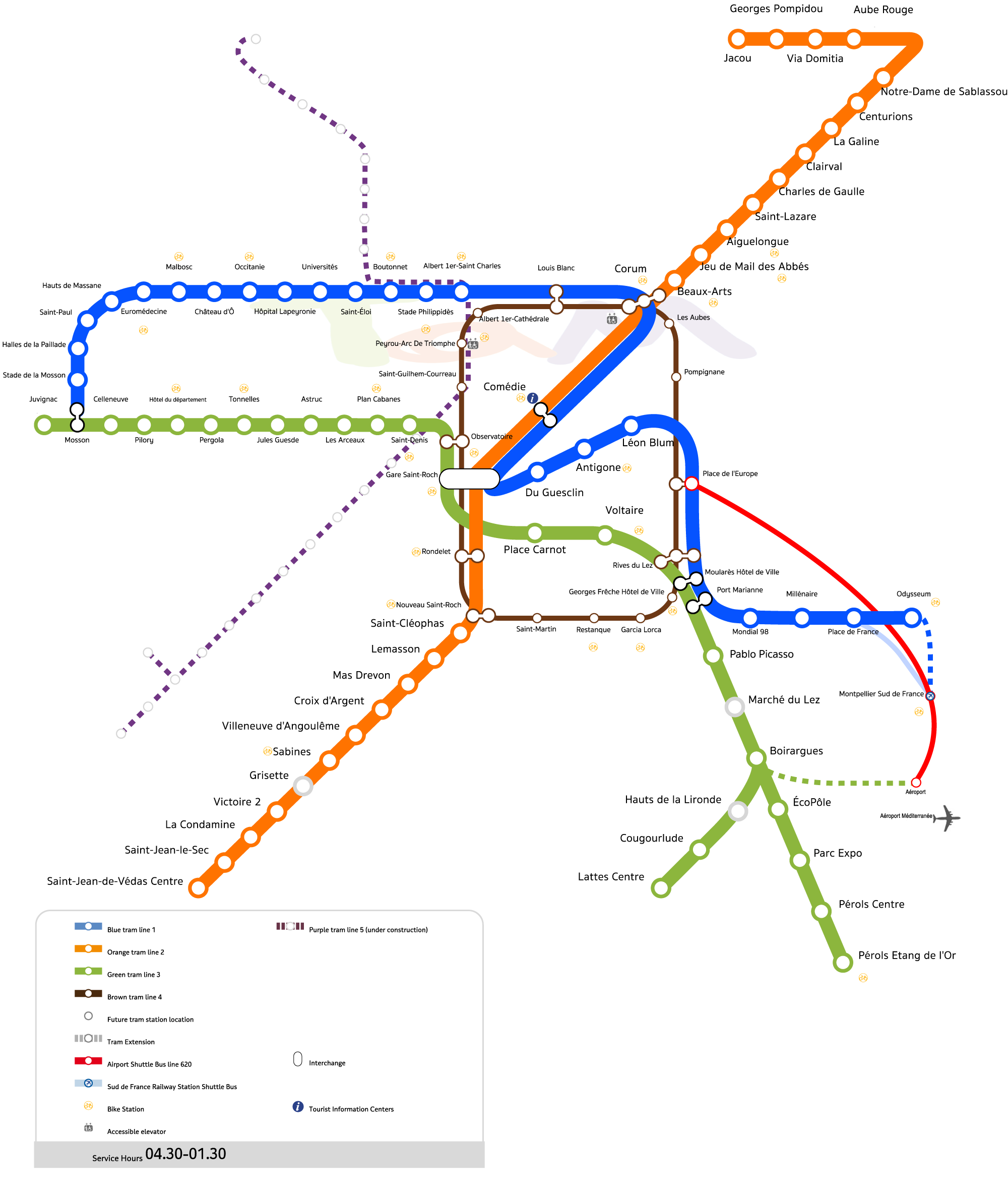
Montpellier tramway map

The Montpellier – Méditerranée Airport is located in the area of Fréjorgues, in the town of Mauguio, southeast of Montpellier.

The Transports de l'agglomération de Montpellier (TaM) manages the city's public transportation, including its 56-kilometre (35 mi) tramway network consisting of five lines and several parking facilities. Line 1 runs from Mosson in the west to Odysseum in the east. Line 2 runs from Jacou in the northeast to St. Jean-de-Vedas in the southwest. Line 3 and Line 4 opened in April 2012. Line 3, which is 22.4-kilometre (13.9 mi) long, links Juvignac and Pérols with a branch to Lattes and serves 32 stations. Line 4 circles the centre and serves as a connector line between the various arms of tram system. They intersect at Gare St. Roch station, Rives du Lez and Corum.

Since 2019, €440 million were invested into the construction of a 5th tramway line, linking the south from Lavérune to Clapiers, up north. It was inaugurated on December 20, 2025.

Since 21 December 2023, the public transport is free for all residents. Previously, all residents under 18 and over 65 years of age have been transported free of charge since 1 September 2021.

The TaM also manages the large bike sharing scheme Vélomagg', started in June 2007, comprising 1200 bicycles and 50 stations.

== Sports ==
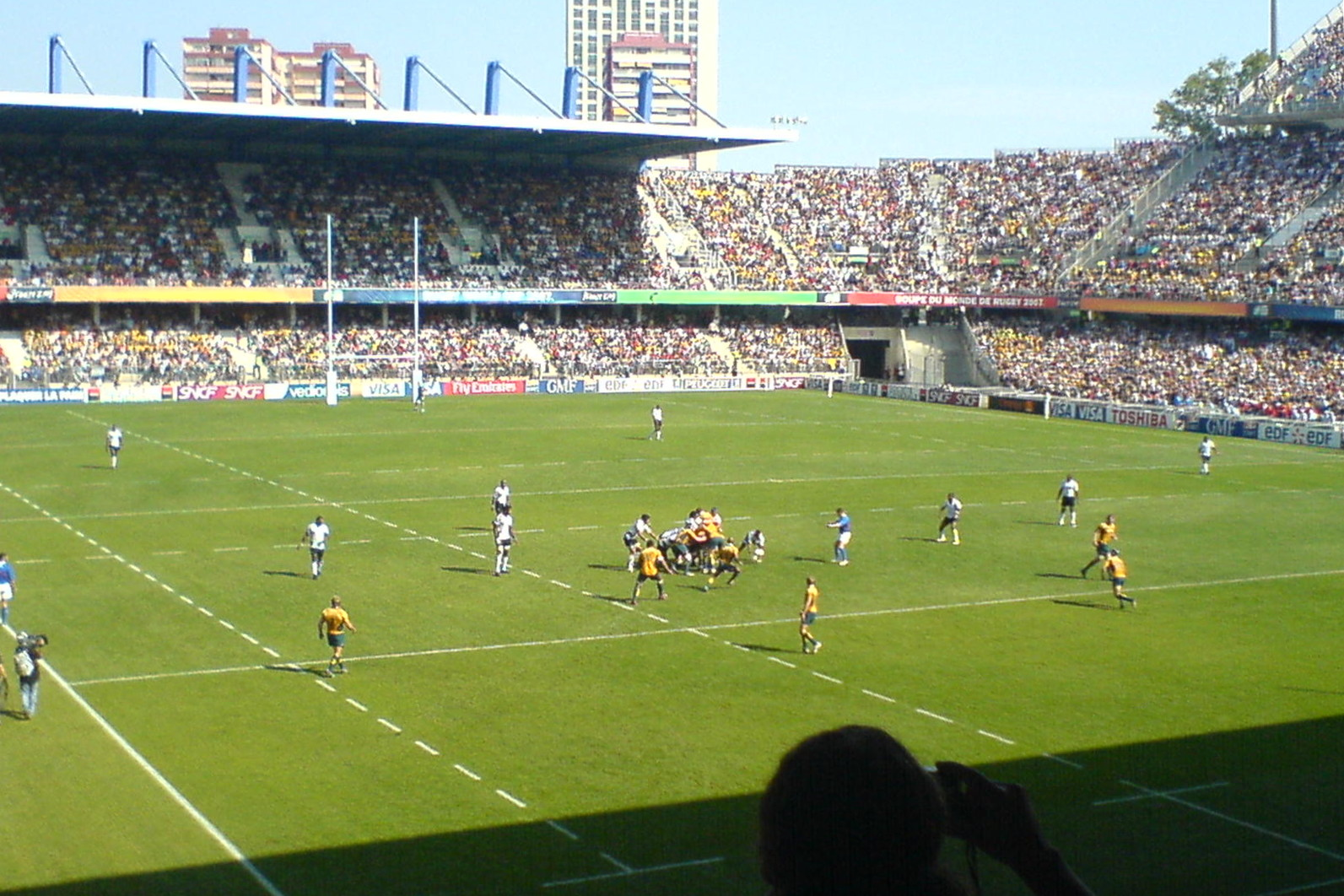
Stade de la Mosson

Montpellier was the finish of Stage 11 and the departure of Stage 12 in the 2007 Tour de France. It was also the finish of Stage 11 and the departure of Stage 12 in the 2016 edition. The city is home to a variety of professional sports teams:

- Montpellier Hérault Rugby, of the Top 14 who play rugby union formerly at the Stade Sabathé and now at the Altrad Stadium. In the 2010/2011 season, the team made it to the Top 14 Final against the Stade Toulousain.
- Montpellier HSC of Ligue 2 who play association football at the Stade de la Mosson. MHSC became French Champions on 20 May 2012.
- Montpellier Agglomération Handball are a major team handball club playing in the French National League, 14 times winner of the French championship and twice winner of the European Cup (last in 2017–2018 season).
- Montpellier Red Devils who play rugby league in Elite 1 division at the Stade Sabathé
- Montpellier Hérault Sport Club Volley-Ball who play in the LNV Ligue A and have 8 National titles, last in 2021–22 season.
- Montpellier Vipers of France's Division 1 ice hockey Federation, play at the Patinoire de l'Agglomération de Montpellier at Odysseum
- Montpellier Water Polo play in the National League and European Cup competitions.
- Barracudas de Montpellier is a baseball club, and competes in Division Élite, a French top level baseball league.

Montpellier was one of the hosts of the FIBA EuroBasket 2015.

The city is home to the Open Sud de France tennis tournament since 2010, and will host the XXXI World Rhythmic Gymnastics Championship.

The main athletics stadium is the Philippidès Stadium, which is owned by the University of Montpellier.

== Culture ==
The city is a centre for cultural events as there are many students. Montpellier has two large concert venues: Le Zénith Sud (7.000 seats) and L'Arena (14.000 seats). Le Corum cultural and conference centre contains three auditoriums.

- The Festival de Radio France et Montpellier is a summer festival of opera and other music held in Montpellier. The festival concentrates on classical music and jazz with about 150 events, including opera, concerts, films, and talks. Most of these events are free and are held in the historic courtyards of the city or in the modern concert halls of Le Corum near historical city center.
- The annual Cinemed, the International Mediterranean Film Festival Montpellier, held in the fall, is the second-largest French film festival after the Cannes Film Festival. Held since 1979, it offers screenings of over 200 long and short films, documentaries, animated films, trailers, and a special program of student films. Other events include panel discussions, exhibitions, and gatherings. Venues include Le Corum and cinema halls.
- Each summer, Montpellier hosts the Montpellier Dance Festival, programming performances from both French and international artists and dance companies. Founded in 1981 by Dominique Bagouet and Jean-Paul Montanari, the festival has since hosted work by acclaimed choreographers such as Merce Cunningham, Bill T Jones, Anne Theresa de Keersmaeker, (LA)HORDE, and others. These performances take place in theaters across the city, such as Le Corum, the Opera Comédie, and the Agora.

== International relations ==
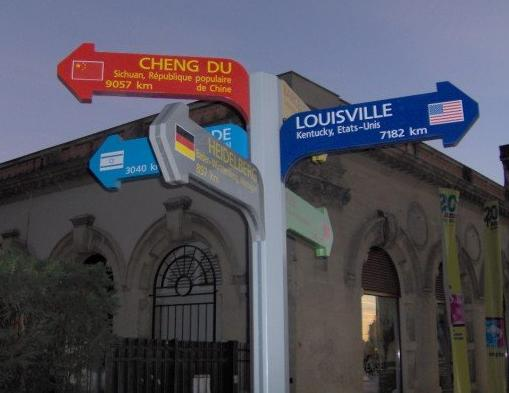
Sign on the Esplanade Charles de Gaulle, showing Montpellier's sister cities

Montpellier is twinned with:

- Barcelona, Spain since 1963
- Bethlehem, Palestine, since 2012
- Chengdu, China, since 1981
- Fes, Morocco since 2003
- Heidelberg, Germany, since 1961
- Kos, Greece, since 1962
- Louisville, United States, since 1955
- Obninsk, Russia, since 2017
- Palermo, Italy, since 2016
- Rio de Janeiro, Brazil since 2011
- Sherbrooke, Canada, since 2006
- Tiberias, Israel, since 1983
- Tlemcen, Algeria, since 2009

== Notable people ==
Montpellier was the birthplace of:

- Abraham ben Isaac of Narbonne (c. 1110–1179), rabbi and author of the halakhic work Ha-Eshkol.
- Solomon ben Abraham of Montpellier (circa the 13th century), Jewish philosopher and Talmudist
- James I of Aragon (1208–1276), King of Aragon and Lord of Montpellier from 1213 to 1276.
- Nicholas of Poland (c. 1235 – c. 1316), Dominican healer.
- Saint Roch (1295–1327), pilgrim to Rome, venerated as a saint by the Catholic Church.
- Guillaume Rondelet (1507–1566), French physician and naturalist.
- Pierre Magnol (1638–1715), botanist, founder of the concept of plant families.
- Charles Bertheau (1660–1732), French pastor.
- Francois Chicoyneau (1672–1752), court physician and member of the French Academy of Sciences
- Jean Raoux (1677–1734), painter.
- Louis Bertrand Castel (1688–1757), mathematician, entered the order of the Jesuits in 1703.
- Pons Augustin Alletz (1703–1785), agronomist
- Joseph-Marie Vien (1716–1809), painter.
- Étienne-Hyacinthe de Ratte (1722–1805), mathematician and astronomer.
- Paul Joseph Barthez (1734–1806), physician.
- Suzanne Verdier (1745–1813), writer.
- Jean Guillaume Bruguière (1749–1798), physician, zoologist and diplomat.
- Cyrille Rigaud (1750–1824), poet.
- Jean Jacques Régis de Cambacérès (1753–1824), lawyer and statesman, author of the Code Napoléon.
- Guillaume-Mathieu Dumas (1753–1837), military leader.
- Louis-Sébastien Lenormand (1757–1837), chemist, physicist, inventor, the world's first modern parachuting pioneer
- Pierre Marie Auguste Broussonet (1761–1807), naturalist, contributed primarily to botany.
- Pierre Antoine Noël Bruno, Comte de Daru (1767–1829), soldier, statesman, historian and poet.
- Laure Junot, Duchess of Abrantès (1784–1838), writer and spouse of French general Jean-Andoche Junot.
- Joseph Frédéric Bérard (1789–1828), physician and philosopher.
- Michel Félix Dunal (1789–1856), botanist, born and died in Montpellier
- Auguste Comte (1798–1857), a founder of the discipline of sociology.
- Antoine Jérôme Balard (1802–1876), chemist.
- Alfred Moquin-Tandon (1804–1863), naturalist and medical doctor
- Émile Saisset (1814–1863), philosopher.
- Charles Bernard Renouvier (1815–1903), philosopher.
- Édouard Albert Roche (1820–1883), astronomer.
- Alfred Bruyas (1821–1876), art collector.
- Alexandre Cabanel (1823–1889), painter.
- Renaud de Vilbac (1829–1884), composer, organist.
- Frédéric Bazille (1841–1870), Impressionist painter.
- Eugène Baudouin (1842–1893), painter.
- Paul Ferrier (1843–1920), dramatist, he also provided libretti for several composers.
- Henri Chantavoine (1850–1918), writer and Professor of Rhetoric.
- Henri-Charles Puech (1902–1986), historian of religion.
- Léo Malet (1909–1996), crime novelist.
- Henri Carol (1910–1984), French composer and organist.
- Jeanne Demessieux (1921–1968), organist, pianist, composer, and pedagogue.
- Monique de Bissy, member of the Resistance during World War II (1923–2009)
- Juliette Gréco (1927–2020), singer and actress.
- Jean-Luc Dehaene (1940–2014), Prime-Minister of Belgium.
- Henri Joyeux (born 1945), oncologic surgeon, nutrition specialist and writer.
- Didier Auriol (born 1958), rally driver, 1994 World Rally Champion.
- Rémi Gaillard (born 1975), famous French prankster.
- Sophie Divry (born 1979), writer, winner of the 2014 Prix Wepler.
- Victor Aviat (1982–2025), oboist and conductor.
- Adèle Charvet (born 1993), operatic mezzo-soprano.

Other notable inhabitants include:

- Arnault de Villeneuve (c.1240-1311), major physician, writer and teacher at the University de Montpellier.
- François Rabelais (1493–1553), student at the University of Montpellier.
- Nostradamus (1503–1566), student at the University of Montpellier.
- Iacob Heraclid (1527–1563), ruler of Moldavia from 1561 to 1563.
- Élisabeth Bouissonade (died 1647), French servant who led a women's uprising
- Pierre-Joseph Amoreux (1741–1824), zoologist.
- Elisabeth Coste (1748–1794), French cloth merchant and resistor.
- Adamantios Korais (1748–1833), Greek humanist scholar and a major figure in the Greek Enlightenment, studied at the University of Montpellier.
- Jean-Louis Michel (1785–1865), fencing master, who lived in Montpellier from 1830 onwards.
- Agénor Azéma de Montgravier (1805–1863), deputy director of l'École d'Artillerie de Montpellier, died in Montpellier.
- Gaston Darboux (1842–1917), mathematician.
- Paul Valéry (1871–1945), French poet, essayist, and philosopher who studied at the University of Montpellier.
- Josias Braun-Blanquet (1884–1980), botanist.
- Taha Hussein (1889–1973), student at the University of Montpellier.
- Jean Moulin (1899–1943), famous French resistant during WWII, studied and worked in Montpellier.
- Michel Navratil (1908–2001), survivor of the sinking of the RMS Titanic.
- Enver Hoxha (1908–1985), student at the University of Montpellier.
- Alexander Grothendieck (1928–2014), mathematician.
- Guy Delisle (born 1966), Canadian-born cartoonist, animator and author.
- Grégory Vignal (born 1981), football coach and former footballer, who played as a left-back.
- Nikola Karabatić (born 1984), handball player.
- Simon Billy (born 1991), speedskier.

== Other locations named after Montpellier ==
The name Montpellier is used for towns and streets in as many as four continents. Many places in the United Kingdom and Ireland carry the name Montpellier. Often they are in resort locations claiming some of the healthy attributes for which the French city was renowned in earlier centuries. The variant spelling "Montpelier" is common, and is of quite early provenance. Brewer uses that spelling. The first example was the early 19th-century suburb of Montpelier in Brighton.

The capital of the American state of Vermont was named Montpelier because of the high regard in which the Americans held the French who had aided their Revolutionary War against the British. Several other American cities are also named Montpelier.

Places named Montpellier/Montpelier are also found in Australia, Canada, South Africa, and the Caribbean.

James Madison, the United States fourth president, named his plantation Montpelier (Orange, Virginia), after the resort-like properties associated with the city at the time.

== See also ==
- Communes of the Hérault department
- Archdiocese of Montpellier
- Montpellier vitalism
