= Place de la Comédie =

City square in Montpellier, France

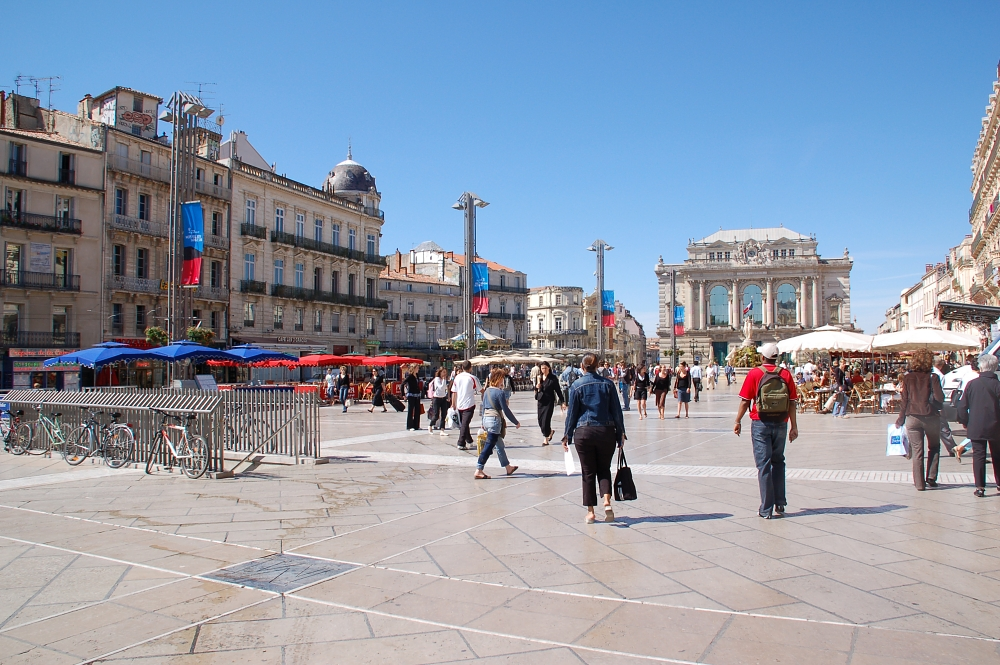
The Place de la Comédie, looking east

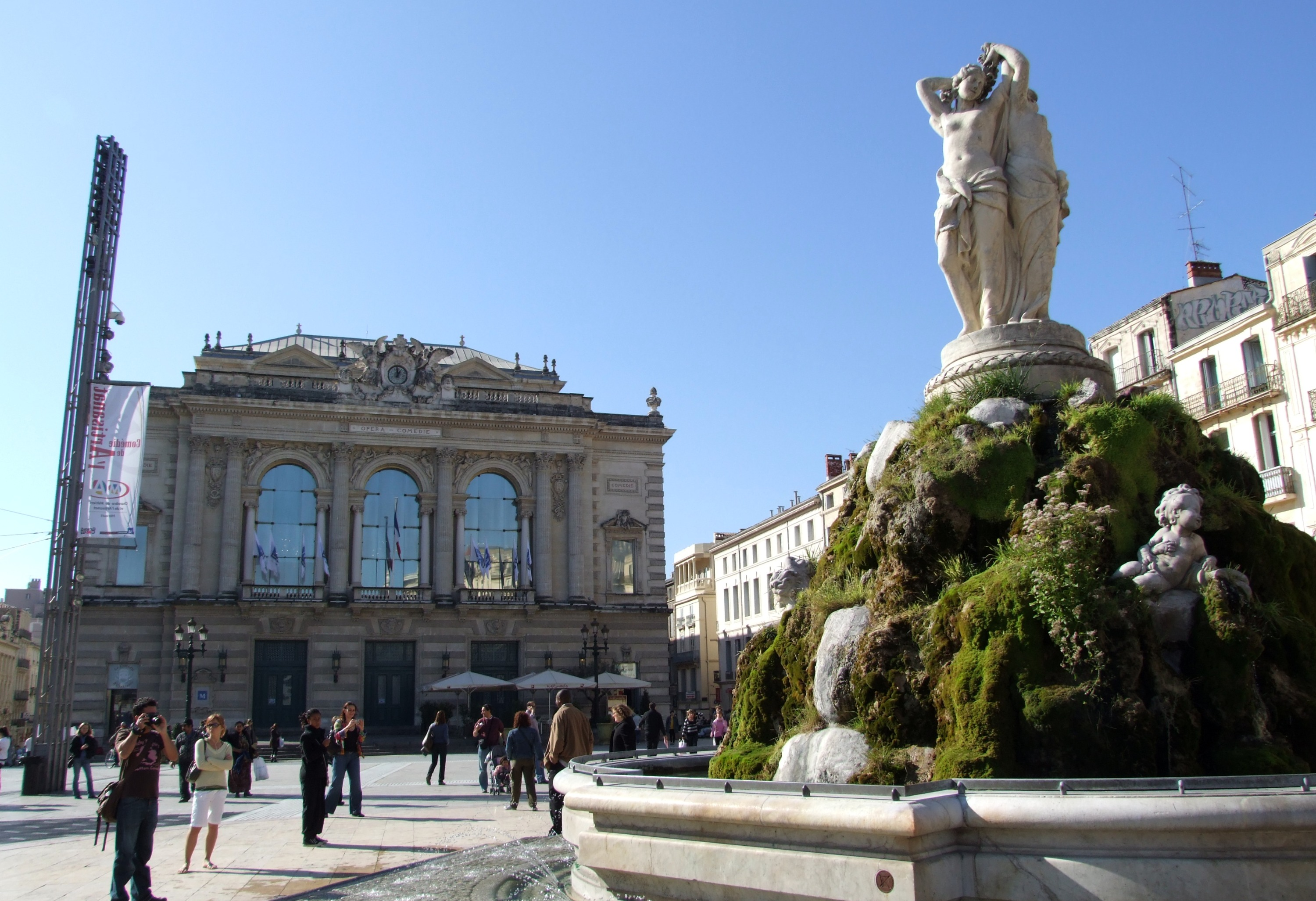
The Opéra Comédie and the Three Graces fountain on the Place de la Comédie.

The Place de la Comédie (French pronunciation: [plas də la kɔmedi]; Occitan: Plaça de la Comèdia) is a square in Montpellier, Hérault in Southern France. It is at the southeast point of the city centre, at 43°36′31.19″N 3°52′47.63″E, where the fortifications of the city were formerly located.

== History ==
The Place became the focal point of the city when, in the mid-19th century the railway station Gare de Montpellier Saint-Roch was built some 200 metres (660 ft) south of it. At that time, a smaller train going to the nearby beach at Palavas-les-Flots also had its point of origin on the Place.

== Location ==
At its northeastern corner, the square continues into the Esplanade de Charles de Gaulle, a small park connecting the Place to the Corum, a large concrete and granite complex built by Claude Vasconi. At its southeastern corner it is linked to the Lycée Joffre, formerly the Citadel of Montpellier.
