= Corum (Montpellier) =

Building in Occitania, France

Coordinates: 43°36′49″N 3°52′56″E

Le Corum in Montpellier

The Corum is a convention center in the city of Montpellier, in southern France. The building is also home to an opera house, the Opéra Berlioz, one of the two venues for the Opéra Orchestre national Montpellier, alongside the Opéra Comédie located at Place de la Comédie. The opera house, which regularly hosts concerts and performances beyond those of the orchestra, can accommodate an audience of 2,000 people seated.

== History ==
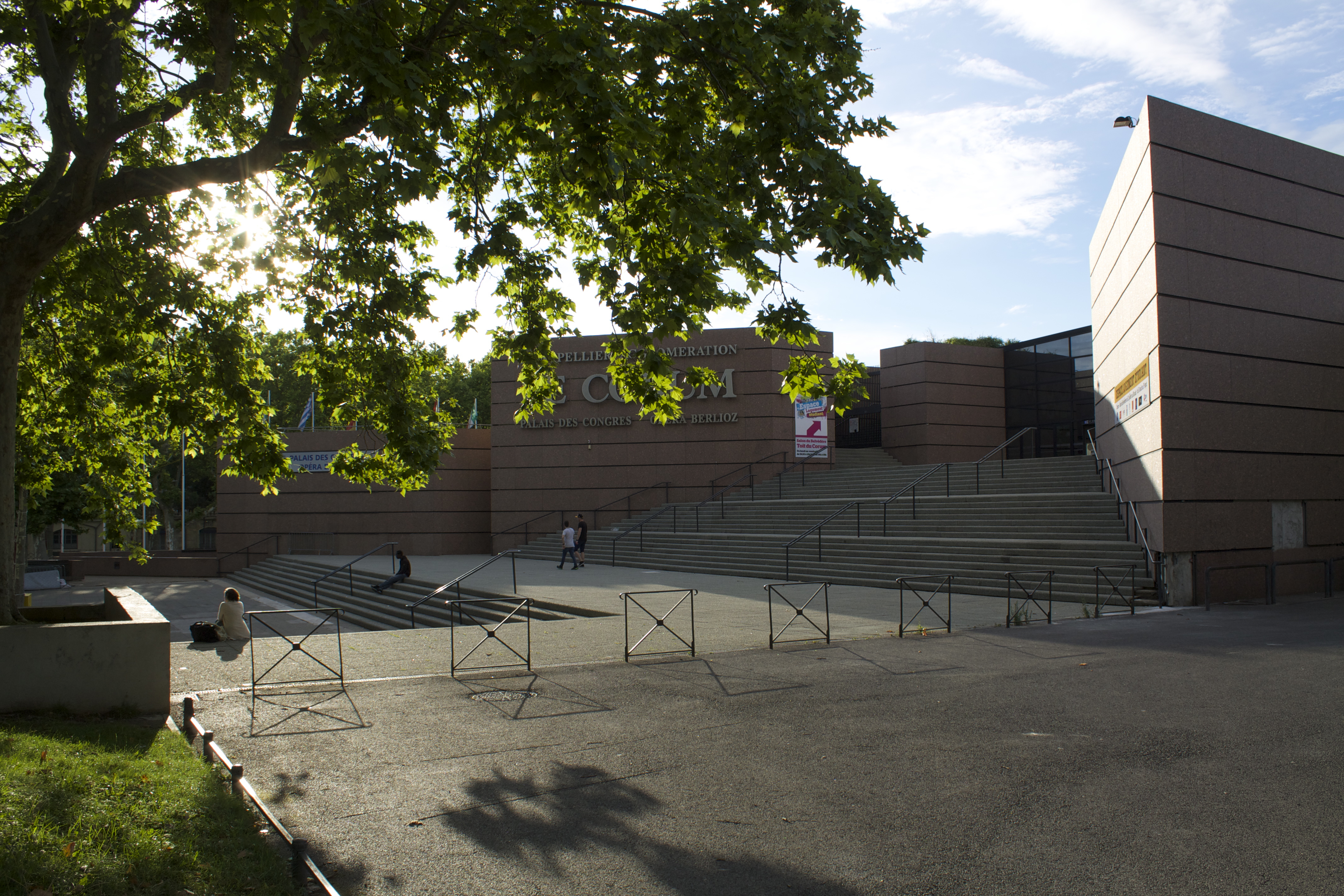
The Corum's entrance from Esplanade

The building was designed primarily by architect Claude Vasconi and opened to the public 1988. It distinguishes itself by its roof, which is covered with "Carmen Red" pink granite slabs from Finland.

It is located in the northeast corner of the Écusson, Montpellier’s historic center, north of the Charles-de-Gaulle Esplanade. Its main entrance on the esplanade is at the top of a hill, and the building extends and unfolds down the slope, overlooking the Place du 11-Novembre and the straight road to Nîmes. At the foot of the Corum is a city transit stop served by three of the five lines of the Montpellier tramway.

The first phase of the Corum was completed in 1989: at that time, it featured two auditoriums and 6,000 square meters of exhibition space. The 2,000-seat Berlioz Opera House (named after Hector Berlioz), with a stage featuring a 20-meter-wide opening, was completed in 1990. It notably also hosts concerts and performances beyond those of the Opéra Orchestre national Montpellier.

It has a helicopter pad, which was used only once (when President François Mitterrand visited for the inauguration of the Corum) and is now out of service.

Since 1999, management of the Corum has been entrusted to "Montpellier Events" (formerly known as "Enjoy Montpellier"), which has also managed the Zénith Sud at the domaine de Grammont since its inception.

The cost of building the Corum was the subject of controversy in the 1980s and 1990s. Some opponents of the mayor at the time, Georges Frêche, used it as a benchmark to estimate the cost of the municipality’s subsequent projects.

In late Semptember 2026, severe weather conditions resulted in significant water infiltration affecting the Corum. An administrative closure order was issued following the safety commission’s recommendation. The mayor announced a closure of at least two to three months, with the hope of a gradual, partial reopening of certain parts of the site. Scheduled events (such as the Cinemed festival and concerts) had to be moved to other venues in the city.
