= Montpellier Zoological Park =

Coordinates: 43.6396°N 3.8736°E

Montpellier Zoo
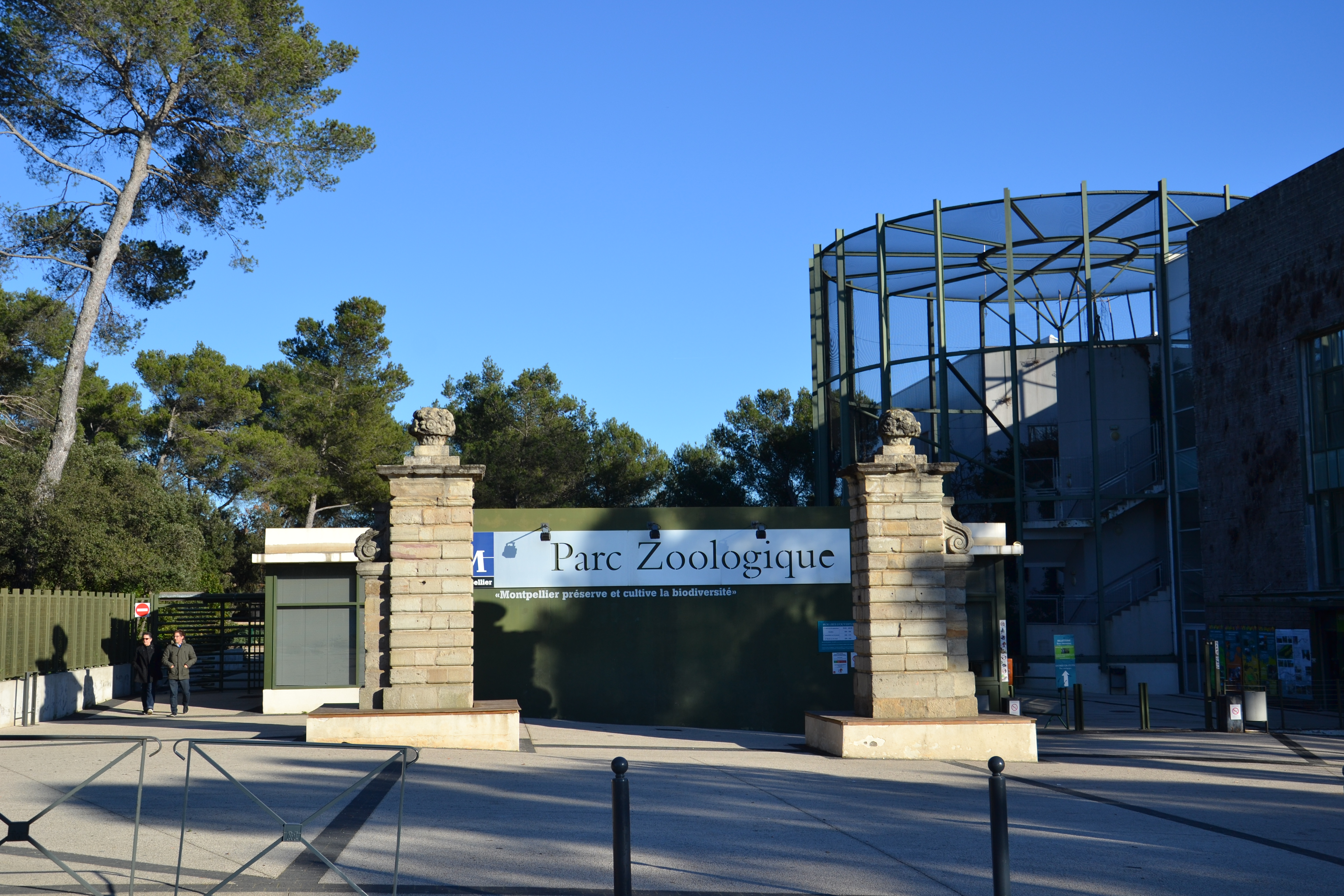
- Entrance
- Interactive map of Montpellier Zoo
- Date opened: 1964
- Location: Montpellier, Occitanie, France
- Land area: 2,600 m^{2}
- No. of animals: 200
- No. of species: 29
- Annual visitors: 650 000
- Owner: Ville de Montpellier
- Website: zoo.montpellier.fr

Montpellier Zoo (formally Parc Zoologique de Lunaret) is a French zoological park located in the north of the city of Montpellier, one of the main cities in the Occitanie region. Situated in the Aiguelongue section of the Hôpitaux-Facultés area, the Lunaret park also contains the Lez nature reserve. Founded in 1964, today it has about 170 animals of 29 different species within its 80 hectares. The zoo belongs to and is financed entirely by the city of Montpellier. Since the beginning of 2023 the zoo has been managed by Marine Baconnais.

Entrance to the zoo is free, which helps to make it one of the most visited zoos in France.

== The Amazonian greenhouse (closed) ==
The greenhouse opened in 2007 as part of the Montpellier Zoo with a footprint of about 2,600 m^{2}. It represented 7 climatic zones and habitats, with a large aviary, and with an artificial rainstorm every two hours to simulate the rainforest environment.

The greenhouse closed in 2022. According to the zoo's official Facebook page, there are plans to reopen it if possible, but there is no suggested date. In August 2025, the zoo's official Facebook page announced that work is underway to rehome the exotic species that remain, in particular its colony of Seba bats. See for any updates about the Amazonian greenhouse.

== See also ==
- List of botanical gardens in France
