= Royal Garden =

Coordinates: 23.42507746480142°S 51.942261596935275°W

Royal Garden is the largest residential building in height of Brazil, at 140 metres and 42 floors, according to List of skyscrapers in Brazil.

Created in 1988, it's the tallest in the state of Paraná.

Designed originally to be the largest in Latin America, this was prevented by the municipal government of the time since its construction during a fire in the 32nd floor was fought with great difficulty due to its height. After this happened, construction of buildings with more than 30 floors in the city was prohibited.

The Royal Garden is located at Avenida Tiradentes in Maringá, Paraná, the building has an apartment per floor, valued around 1.5 million of U.S. dollars each.
