= Édouard Alletz =

French diplomat

Édouard Alletz (1798–1850) was a French diplomat.

== Major publications ==
- The dedication of French doctors and sisters of Saint-Camille, during the Yellow fever Barcelona "", Paris, Didot (1822)
- Walpole, dramatic poem in three songs (1825)
- Essay on Man, or Agreement of philosophy and religion (1826)
- Sketches of mental distress (1828)
- New Messiah, a poem (1830)
- Poetic studies of the human heart (1832)
- Picture of the general history of Europe since 1814 until 1830 (3 volumes, 1834)
- Poetic characters (1834)
- Letter to M. de Lamartine on the truth of Christianity considered in its relations with the passions (1835)
- Diseases of the century (1836) Online text
- New Democracy, or Manners and power of the middle classes in France (2 volumes, 1837)
- Adventures of Alfonso Doria (2 volumes, 1838)
- Political maxims for the use of the new democracy (1840)
- Signs of the new spirit in parliament (1841)
- Poetical Sketches of Life (2 volumes, 1841)
- Genius of the nineteenth century, or sketch of the progress of the human spirit since 1800 until today (1842 to 1843)
- Discourse on the power and downfall of the Republic of Venice (1842)
- Harmonies of human intelligence (2 volumes, 1846)

== Honors and Awards ==
- Knight of the Order of Legion of Honour (1835)
- Officer of the Order of Legion of Honour (1850)
