= Henri Chantavoine =

French writer and professor

- Born: 6 August 1850; Montpellier
- Died: 25 August 1918 (aged 68); Lyon
- Education: École Normale Supérieure

Henri Chantavoine (6 August 1850 – 25 August 1918) was a French writer and Professor of Rhetoric.

Chantavoine was born in Montpellier and educated at the École Normale Supérieure. After teaching in the provinces he moved, in 1876, to the Lycée Charlemagne in Paris, and subsequently became Professor of Rhetoric at the Lycée Henri IV and maître de conférences at the École Normale at Sèvres. He was associated with the Nouvelle Revue from its foundation in 1879, and he joined the Journal des débats in 1884. His poems include Poèmes sincères (1877), Satires contemporaines (1881), Ad memoriam (1884), and Au fil des jours (1889).
