= Cantons of the Hérault department =

The following is a list of the 25 cantons of the Hérault department, in France, following the French canton reorganisation which came into effect in March 2015:

- Agde
- Béziers-1
- Béziers-2
- Béziers-3
- Cazouls-lès-Béziers
- Clermont-l'Hérault
- Le Crès
- Frontignan
- Gignac
- Lattes
- Lodève
- Lunel
- Mauguio
- Mèze
- Montpellier-1
- Montpellier-2
- Montpellier-3
- Montpellier-4
- Montpellier-5
- Montpellier - Castelnau-le-Lez
- Pézenas
- Pignan
- Saint-Gély-du-Fesc
- Saint-Pons-de-Thomières
- Sète
