= Vérargues =

- Part of Entre-Vignes
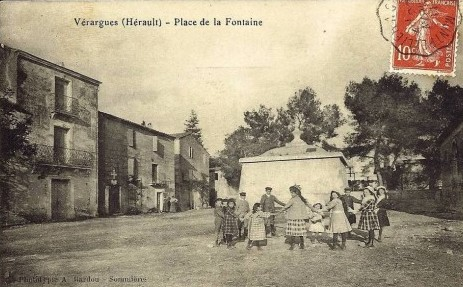
- An old postcard view of Vérargues

- Coat of arms
- Location of Vérargues
- Location within France Location within Occitanie
- Coordinates: 43°43′02″N 4°06′01″E
- Country: France
- Region: Occitania
- Department: Hérault
- Arrondissement: Montpellier
- Canton: Lunel
- Commune: Entre-Vignes
- Area^{1}: 5.51 km^{2} (2.13 sq mi)
- Elevation: 80 m (260 ft)
- Highest elevation: 65 m (213 ft)
- Lowest elevation: 15 m (49 ft)
- Population (2023): 745
  - Density: 135/km^{2} (350/sq mi)
- Time zone: UTC+01:00 (CET)
  - Summer (DST): UTC+02:00 (CEST)
- Postal code: 34400
- ^{1} French Land Register data, which excludes lakes, ponds, glaciers > 1 km^{2} (0.386 sq mi or 247 acres) and river estuaries.

Vérargues (French pronunciation: [veʁaʁɡ]; Provençal: Verargas) is a former commune in the Hérault department in the Occitanie region in southern France. On 1 January 2019, it was merged into the new commune Entre-Vignes.

== Climate ==
The climate is hot-summer Mediterranean (Köppen: Csa). The average annual temperature in Vérargues is 14.6 °C (58.3 °F). The average annual rainfall is 743.9 mm (29.29 in) with October as the wettest month. The temperatures are highest on average in July, at around 23.8 °C (74.8 °F), and lowest in January, at around 6.5 °C (43.7 °F). On 28 June 2019, during the 2019 European heat wave, a temperature of 46.0 °C (114.8 °F) was recorded in Vérargues, the highest in French meteorological history.

Climate data for Vérargues, elevation: 56 m (184 ft), 1981–2010 normals, extremes 1980–present
Month	Jan	Feb	Mar	Apr	May	Jun	Jul	Aug	Sep	Oct	Nov	Dec	Year
Record high °C (°F)	22.5 (72.5)	25.0 (77.0)	29.5 (85.1)	33.0 (91.4)	36.0 (96.8)	46.0 (114.8)	39.0 (102.2)	41.5 (106.7)	37.5 (99.5)	33.5 (92.3)	26.5 (79.7)	21.0 (69.8)	46.0 (114.8)
Mean daily maximum °C (°F)	11.2 (52.2)	12.6 (54.7)	16.0 (60.8)	18.7 (65.7)	23.0 (73.4)	27.5 (81.5)	30.7 (87.3)	30.3 (86.5)	25.8 (78.4)	20.5 (68.9)	14.9 (58.8)	11.7 (53.1)	20.3 (68.5)
Daily mean °C (°F)	6.5 (43.7)	7.5 (45.5)	10.4 (50.7)	13.0 (55.4)	17.1 (62.8)	20.8 (69.4)	23.8 (74.8)	23.4 (74.1)	19.6 (67.3)	15.5 (59.9)	10.2 (50.4)	7.2 (45.0)	14.6 (58.3)
Mean daily minimum °C (°F)	1.8 (35.2)	2.3 (36.1)	4.8 (40.6)	7.3 (45.1)	11.1 (52.0)	14.2 (57.6)	16.9 (62.4)	16.6 (61.9)	13.4 (56.1)	10.5 (50.9)	5.5 (41.9)	2.8 (37.0)	9.0 (48.2)
Record low °C (°F)	−13.5 (7.7)	−12.0 (10.4)	−8.0 (17.6)	−2.5 (27.5)	2.0 (35.6)	5.0 (41.0)	8.0 (46.4)	6.5 (43.7)	3.0 (37.4)	−1.5 (29.3)	−6.0 (21.2)	−10.0 (14.0)	−13.5 (7.7)
Average precipitation mm (inches)	60.7 (2.39)	50.9 (2.00)	40.5 (1.59)	65.4 (2.57)	54.2 (2.13)	30.6 (1.20)	23.4 (0.92)	43.6 (1.72)	103.0 (4.06)	114.2 (4.50)	86.3 (3.40)	73.8 (2.91)	743.9 (29.29)
Average precipitation days (≥ 1.0 mm)	6.3	5.2	5.4	6.9	6.5	4.5	2.6	4.1	5.4	7.3	6.7	6.4	67.4
Source: Meteo France

== See also ==
- Communes of the Hérault department
