= Arrondissement of Montpellier =

Coordinates: 43°36′33″N 3°52′21″E

Montpellier
- Arrondissement
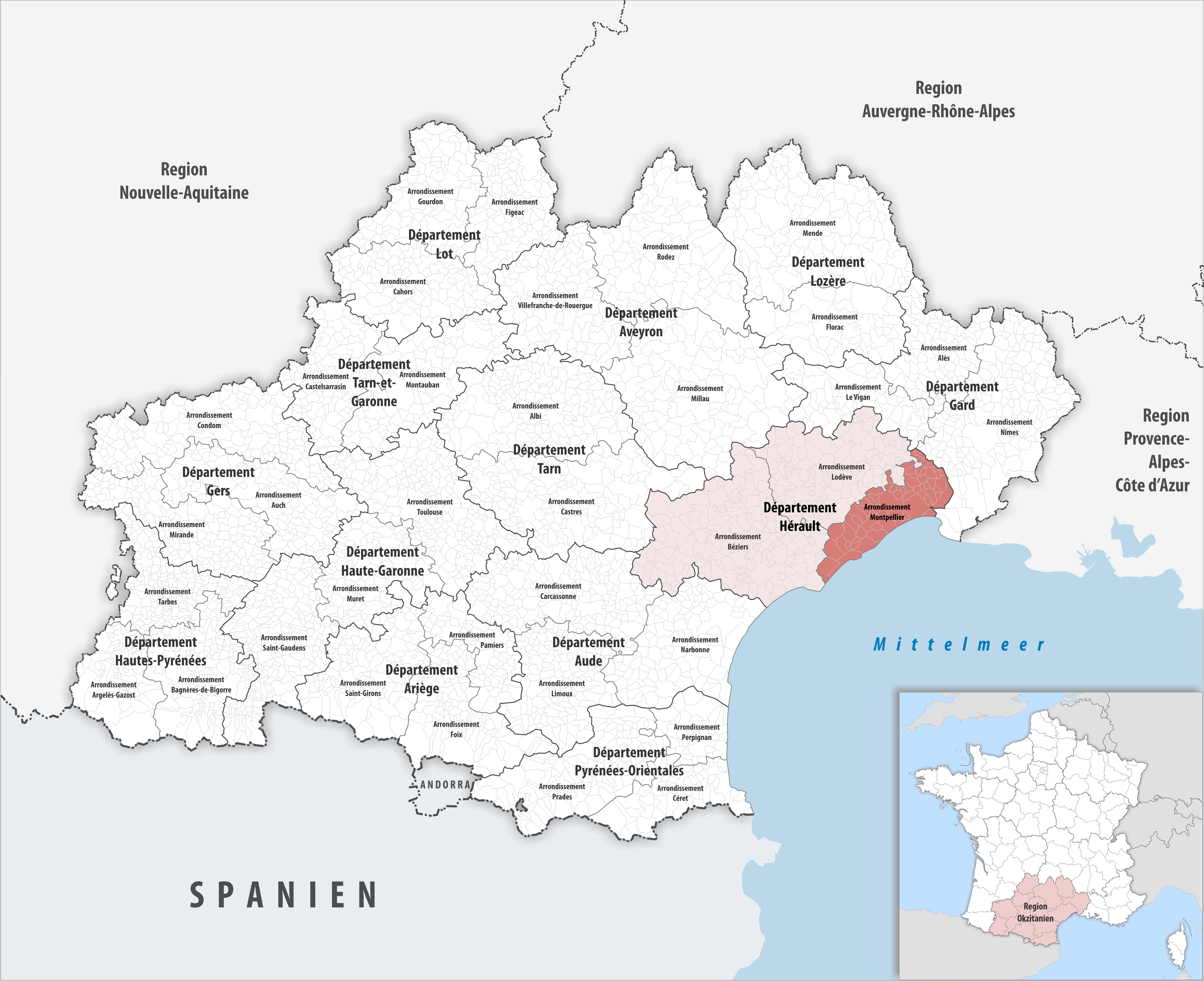
- Location within the region Occitanie
- Country: France
- Region: Occitania
- Department: Hérault
- No. of communes: {{{nbcomm}}}
- Area: 1,004.8 km^{2} (388.0 sq mi)
- Population (2023): 752,444
  - Density: 748.85/km^{2} (1,939.5/sq mi)
- INSEE code: 343

The arrondissement of Montpellier is an arrondissement of France. It is part of the Hérault département. Its INSEE code is 343 and its capital city, and prefecture of the department, is Montpellier. It has 67 communes. Its population is 733,159 (2021), and its area is 1,004.8 km^{2} (388.0 sq mi).

The main cities in the arrondissement, with more than 20,000 inhabitants in 2019, are Montpellier (295,542 inhabitants), Sète (43,858 inhabitants), Lunel (26,385 inhabitants), Frontignan (23,028 inhabitants) and Castelnau-le-Lez (22,534 inhabitants).

== Geography ==
The arrondissement covers the northeastern part of the department and is bordered to the north and northeast by the Gard department, to the east and south by the Gulf of Lion (Mediterranean Sea), to the southwest by the arrondissement of Béziers and to the west by the arrondissement of Lodève.

== Composition ==
The communes of the arrondissement of Montpellier are (with their INSEE codes):

- Baillargues (34022)
- Balaruc-le-Vieux (34024)
- Balaruc-les-Bains (34023)
- Beaulieu (34027)
- Boisseron (34033)
- Bouzigues (34039)
- Campagne (34048)
- Candillargues (34050)
- Castelnau-le-Lez (34057)
- Castries (34058)
- Clapiers (34077)
- Cournonsec (34087)
- Cournonterral (34088)
- Le Crès (34090)
- Entre-Vignes (34246)
- Fabrègues (34095)
- Frontignan (34108)
- Galargues (34110)
- Garrigues (34112)
- Gigean (34113)
- Grabels (34116)
- La Grande-Motte (34344)
- Jacou (34120)
- Juvignac (34123)
- Lansargues (34127)
- Lattes (34129)
- Lavérune (34134)
- Loupian (34143)
- Lunel (34145)
- Lunel-Viel (34146)
- Marseillan (34150)
- Marsillargues (34151)
- Mauguio (34154)
- Mireval (34159)
- Montaud (34164)
- Montbazin (34165)
- Montferrier-sur-Lez (34169)
- Montpellier (34172)
- Mudaison (34176)
- Murviel-lès-Montpellier (34179)
- Mèze (34157)
- Palavas-les-Flots (34192)
- Pignan (34202)
- Poussan (34213)
- Prades-le-Lez (34217)
- Pérols (34198)
- Restinclières (34227)
- Saint-Aunès (34240)
- Saint-Brès (34244)
- Saint-Drézéry (34249)
- Saint-Geniès-des-Mourgues (34256)
- Saint-Georges-d'Orques (34259)
- Saint-Jean-de-Védas (34270)
- Saint-Just (34272)
- Saint-Nazaire-de-Pézan (34280)
- Saint-Sériès (34288)
- Saturargues (34294)
- Saussan (34295)
- Saussines (34296)
- Sussargues (34307)
- Sète (34301)
- Valergues (34321)
- Vendargues (34327)
- Vic-la-Gardiole (34333)
- Villeneuve-lès-Maguelone (34337)
- Villetelle (34340)
- Villeveyrac (34341)

== History ==
The arrondissement of Montpellier was created in 1800. In 2009 it lost the three cantons of Aniane, Ganges and Saint-Martin-de-Londres to the arrondissement of Lodève. At the January 2017 reorganisation of the arrondissements of Hérault, it gained one commune from the arrondissement of Béziers, and it lost 26 communes to the arrondissement of Lodève.

As a result of the reorganisation of the cantons of France which came into effect in 2015, the borders of the cantons are no longer related to the borders of the arrondissements. The cantons of the arrondissement of Montpellier were, as of January 2015:

- Castelnau-le-Lez
- Castries
- Claret
- Frontignan
- Lattes
- Lunel
- Les Matelles
- Mauguio
- Mèze
- Montpellier-1
- Montpellier-2
- Montpellier-3
- Montpellier-4
- Montpellier-5
- Montpellier-6
- Montpellier-7
- Montpellier-8
- Montpellier-9
- Montpellier-10
- Pignan
- Sète-1
- Sète-2
