= Saint-Christol, Hérault =

Saint-Christol
- Part of Entre-Vignes
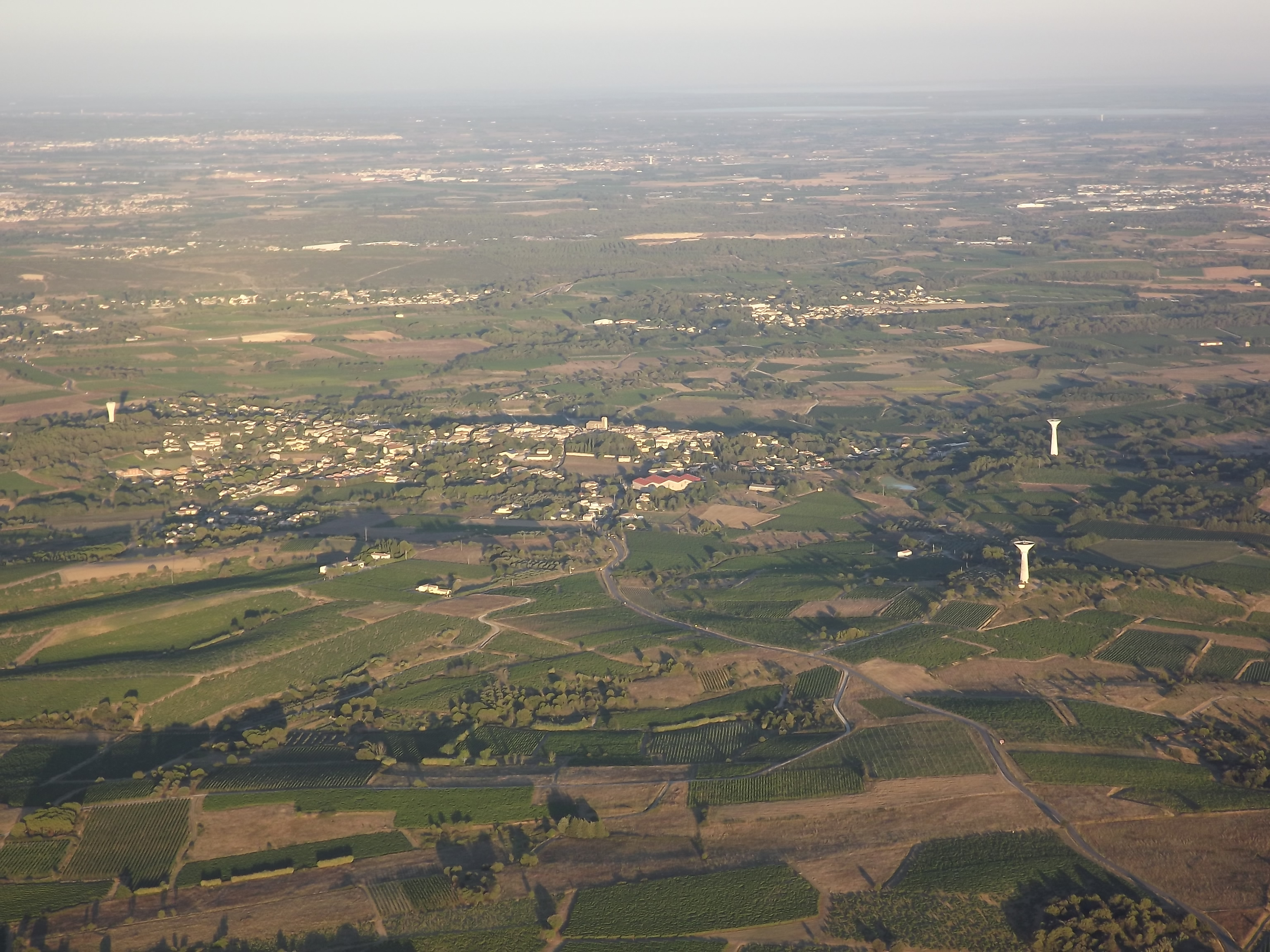
- An aerial view of Saint-Christol

- Coat of arms
- Location of Saint-Christol
- Location within France Location within Occitanie
- Coordinates: 43°43′43″N 4°04′50″E
- Country: France
- Region: Occitania
- Department: Hérault
- Arrondissement: Montpellier
- Canton: Lunel
- Commune: Entre-Vignes
- Area^{1}: 11.29 km^{2} (4.36 sq mi)
- Elevation: 57 m (187 ft)
- Highest elevation: 92 m (302 ft)
- Lowest elevation: 24 m (79 ft)
- Population (2022): 1,445
  - Density: 128.0/km^{2} (331.5/sq mi)
- Time zone: UTC+01:00 (CET)
  - Summer (DST): UTC+02:00 (CEST)
- Postal code: 34400
- ^{1} French Land Register data, which excludes lakes, ponds, glaciers > 1 km^{2} (0.386 sq mi or 247 acres) and river estuaries.

Saint-Christol (French pronunciation: [sɛ̃ kʁistɔl]; Provençal: Sant Cristòu) is a former commune in the Hérault department in the Occitanie region in southern France. On 1 January 2019, it was merged into the new commune Entre-Vignes.

== Population ==
Historical population
Year	Pop.	±% p.a.
1962	665	—
1968	682	+0.42%
1975	681	−0.02%
1982	815	+2.60%
1990	1,076	+3.53%
1999	1,215	+1.36%
2006	1,346	+1.47%
2022	1,445	+0.44%
Source: EHESS and INSEE

== See also ==
- Communes of the Hérault department
