= Opinion polling for the 2015 French departmental elections =

This page lists public opinion polls conducted for the 2015 French departmental elections, which were held in two rounds on 22 and 29 March 2015.

Unless otherwise noted, all polls listed below are compliant with the regulations of the national polling commission (Commission nationale des sondages) and utilize the quota method.

== National ==
=== First round ===
Polling firm	Fieldwork date	Sample size	Abs.	EXG	FG	EELV	PS	DVG	MoDem	UDI	UMP	DVD	FN	DIV
2015 election	22 Mar 2015	–	49.83%	0.07%	6.10%	2.03%	21.46%	7.10%	0.64%	1.29%	27.46%	7.21%	25.24%	1.40%
Ifop-Fiducial	18–19 Mar 2015	1,132	53%	<0.5%	6%	3%	20%	4%	29%			6%	30%	2%
OpinionWay	17–19 Mar 2015	2,274	54%	–	6%	3%	22%	4%	0.5%	0.5%	29%	4%	29%	2%
Harris Interactive	17–18 Mar 2015	1,015	–	<0.5%	7%	2%	19%	5%	1%	28%		8%	29%	1%
CSA	16–18 Mar 2015	979	56%	<0.5%	7%	3%	20%	4%	3%	27%		5%	28%	3%
Ipsos	16–17 Mar 2015	1,038	54%	–	7%	2%	21%	5%	0.5%	(DVD)	30%	4%	29%	1.5%
Ifop	11–13 Mar 2015	1,473	54%	<0.5%	6%	3%	19%	5%	<0.5%	29%		5%	30%	3%
Harris Interactive	10–11 Mar 2015	1,020	–	0.5%	7%	3%	26%		0.5%	32%			29%	2%
Odoxa	5–6 Mar 2015	880	–	1%	8%	4%	20%		–	29%		–	31%	7%
Harris Interactive	3–5 Mar 2015	1,030	–	1%	6%	4%	21%		3%	28%			30%	7%
OpinionWay	3–5 Mar 2015	977	56%	–	7%	2%	21%	5%	1%	1%	29%	5%	28%	1%
CSA	2–4 Mar 2015	965	58%	<0.5%	6%	2%	21%	4%	5%		25%	5%	29%	3%
Odoxa	26–27 Feb 2015	807	–	2%	9%	4%	19%		–	27%		–	33%	6%
Ifop	19–20 Feb 2015	918	57%	2%	6%	7%	20%	–	–	28%		–	30%	7%
Ifop-Fiducial	11–13 Feb 2015	900	–	2%	7%	6%	21%	–	6%	27%		–	29%	2%
BVA	29–30 Jan 2015	1,028	–	2%	9%	7%	18%		8%	5%	25%	–	26%	–
Odoxa	22–23 Jan 2015	1,015	–	1%	10%	7%	20%		6%	7%	23%	–	26%	–
Odoxa	11–12 Dec 2014	1,002	–	2%	9%	7%	17%		5%	7%	25%	–	28%	–

=== By second round configuration ===
The Ifop poll conducted from 23 to 24 March 2015 tested hypotheses in cantons in which specific configurations were present in the second round; the sample size provided represents the entire poll and not that within each configuration.

==== Left–right–FN ====
Polling firm	Fieldwork date	Sample size	Abs.	Left	Right	FN
Odoxa	11–12 Dec 2014	1,002	–	32%	39%	29%
Ifop	23–24 Mar 2015	1,902	–	35%	34%	31%
Harris Interactive	22 Mar 2015	991	–	37%	41%	22%

==== Left–right ====
Polling firm	Fieldwork date	Sample size	Abs.	Left	Right
Ifop	23–24 Mar 2015	1,902	–	44%	56%
Harris Interactive	22 Mar 2015	991	–	42%	58%

==== Left–FN ====
Polling firm	Fieldwork date	Sample size	Abs.	Left	FN
Ifop	23–24 Mar 2015	1,902	–	54%	46%
Harris Interactive	22 Mar 2015	991	–	60%	40%

==== Right–FN ====
Polling firm	Fieldwork date	Sample size	Abs.	Right	FN
Ifop	23–24 Mar 2015	1,902	–	63%	37%
Harris Interactive	22 Mar 2015	991	–	71%	29%

=== Departmental projections ===
The departmental projections below were constructed for the 93 departments of metropolitan France excluding Corse-du-Sud and Haute-Corse.

Polling firm	Fieldwork date	Left	Right	Hung
2015 election	29 Mar 2015	29	64	0
OpinionWay	27 Mar 2015	27	61	5
OpinionWay	23 Mar 2015	25	63	5
OpinionWay	22 Mar 2015	19	71	3
OpinionWay	19 Mar 2015	20	66	7

=== Cantonal projections ===
Polling firm	Fieldwork date	Sample size	Left	Right	FN
OpinionWay	27 Mar 2015	–	750–800	1100–1150	60–100
Ifop	23–24 Mar 2015	1,902	560–680	970–1110	50–110

== Aisne ==
Polling firm	Fieldwork date	Sample size	Abs.	FG/ PCF	PS/ DVG	UMP/ UDI	FN	DIV
2015 election	22 Mar 2015	–	46.73%	2.63%	28.92%	29.60%	38.67%	0.17%
Odoxa	6–10 Mar 2015	814	–	7%	20%	24%	41%	8%

== Dordogne ==
Polling firm	Fieldwork date	Sample size	Abs.	FG/ PCF	PS/ PRG	DVG/ EELV	UMP/UDI/ MoDem	DVD	FN
2015 election	22 Mar 2015	–	39.96%	10.40%	33.67%	4.44%	19.94%	10.18%	21.37%
Ifop	11–12 Mar 2015	804	48%	10%	22%	10%	26%	7%	25%

== Gard ==
Polling firm	Fieldwork date	Sample size	Abs.	FG	PS	DVG/ EELV	UMP/UDI/ MoDem	DVD/ DLF	FN
2015 election	22 Mar 2015	–	46.02%	11.77%	15.78%	9.62%	22.21%	3.48%	35.54%
Ifop	16–17 Mar 2015	604	52%	10%	16%	9%	25%	7%	33%

== Gironde ==
Polling firm	Fieldwork date	Sample size	Abs.	FG	PS/ DVG	EELV	UMP/UDI/ MoDem/CPNT	DVD	FN
2015 election	22 Mar 2015	–	49.45%	8.05%	33.05%	2.60%	31.84%	1.22%	22.78%
Ifop	13–14 Mar 2015	802	50%	7%	24%	11%	28%	9%	21%

== Landes ==
Polling firm	Fieldwork date	Sample size	Abs.	FG	PS	EELV	UMP/UDI/ MoDem	FN
2015 election	22 Mar 2015	–	42.80%	7.85%	38.79%	1.62%	32.63%	18.67%
Ifop	11–12 Mar 2015	802	50%	11%	28%	6%	32%	23%

== Pyrénées-Orientales ==
Polling firm	Fieldwork date	Sample size	Abs.	PS	DVG/FG/ EELV	UMP/ UDI	FN	DIV
2015 election	22 Mar 2015	–	42.80%	25.02%	7.97%	23.65%	31.42%	11.95%
Ifop	16–17 Mar 2015	604	48%	22%	10%	30%	33%	5%

== Essonne ==
Polling firm	Fieldwork date	Sample size	Abs.	FG/ PCF	PS	UMP/ UDI	DVD	FN	DIV
2015 election	22 Mar 2015	–	52.58%	5.08%	31.47%	31.57%	8.32%	22.71%	0.85%
PollingVox	19 Mar 2015	–	–	11%	23%	31%	5%	23%	7%
Odoxa	3–5 Mar 2015	807	–	16%	22%	25%	9%	20%	8%

== Val-de-Marne ==
Polling firm	Fieldwork date	Sample size	Abs.	FG/ PCF	PS/ DVG	EELV	UMP/ UDI	FN
2015 election	22 Mar 2015	–	55.56%	17.20%	21.95%	6.21%	33.33%	17.21%
Odoxa	11–13 Mar 2015	813	–	23%	19%	8%	31%	19%
