= Lunel Agglo =

Coordinates: 43°41′N 04°08′E

- Communauté d'agglomération
- Country: France
- Region: Occitania
- Department: Hérault
- No. of communes: {{{nbcomm}}}
- Established: 1993
- Area: 157.9 km^{2} (61.0 sq mi)
- Population (2021): 51,364
  - Density: 325.3/km^{2} (842.5/sq mi)
- Website: www.lunelagglo.fr

Lunel Agglo is the communauté d'agglomération, an intercommunal structure, centred on the town of Lunel. It is located in the Hérault department, in the Occitanie region, southern France. It was established in December 1993 as the communauté de communes du Pays de Lunel. It was transformed into a communauté d'agglomération in January 2024. Its seat is in Lunel. Its area is 157.9 km^{2}. Its population was 51,364 in 2021, of which 26,185 in Lunel proper.

== Composition ==
The communauté d'agglomération consists of the following 14 communes:

1. Boisseron
2. Campagne
3. Entre-Vignes
4. Galargues
5. Garrigues
6. Lunel
7. Lunel-Viel
8. Marsillargues
9. Saint-Just
10. Saint-Nazaire-de-Pézan
11. Saint-Sériès
12. Saturargues
13. Saussines
14. Villetelle
