= Garrigues, Hérault =

Garrigues
- Commune
- Coat of arms
- Location of Garrigues
- Location within France Location within Occitanie
- Coordinates: 43°47′44″N 4°00′53″E
- Country: France
- Region: Occitania
- Department: Hérault
- Arrondissement: Montpellier
- Canton: Lunel
- Intercommunality: CA Lunel Agglo

Government
  - Mayor (2022–2026): Patrick Mary
- Area^{1}: 4.92 km^{2} (1.90 sq mi)
- Elevation: 70 m (230 ft)
- Highest elevation: 221 m (725 ft)
- Lowest elevation: 58 m (190 ft)
- Population (2023): 236
  - Density: 48.0/km^{2} (124/sq mi)
- Time zone: UTC+01:00 (CET)
  - Summer (DST): UTC+02:00 (CEST)
- INSEE/Postal code: 34112 /34160
- ^{1} French Land Register data, which excludes lakes, ponds, glaciers > 1 km^{2} (0.386 sq mi or 247 acres) and river estuaries.

Garrigues (French pronunciation: [ɡaʁiɡ]; Occitan: Garrigas) is a commune in the Hérault département in Occitanie in southern France.

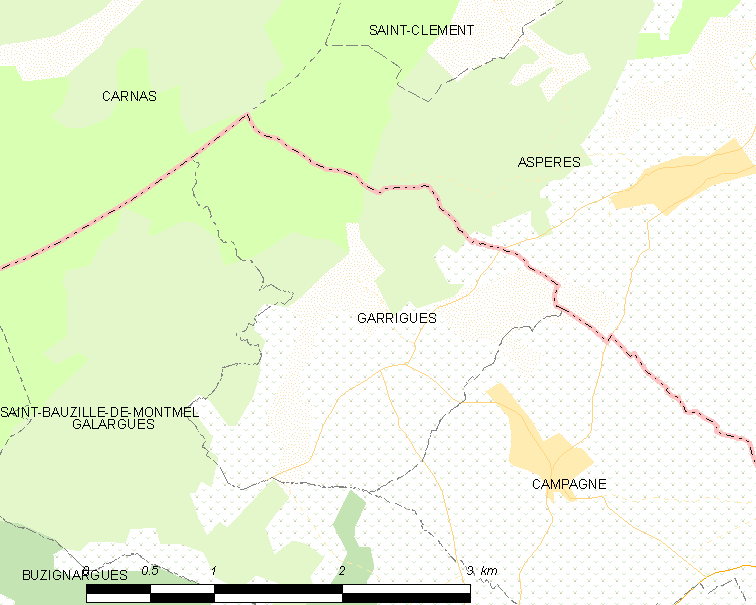
Map

== Population ==
Historical population
Year	Pop.	±% p.a.
1968	99	—
1975	82	−2.66%
1982	88	+1.01%
1990	80	−1.18%
1999	127	+5.27%
2007	145	+1.67%
2012	170	+3.23%
2017	177	+0.81%
2023	236	+4.91%
Source: INSEE

Its inhabitants are called Garrigois in French.

== See also ==
- Communes of the Hérault department
