= Saussines =

- Commune
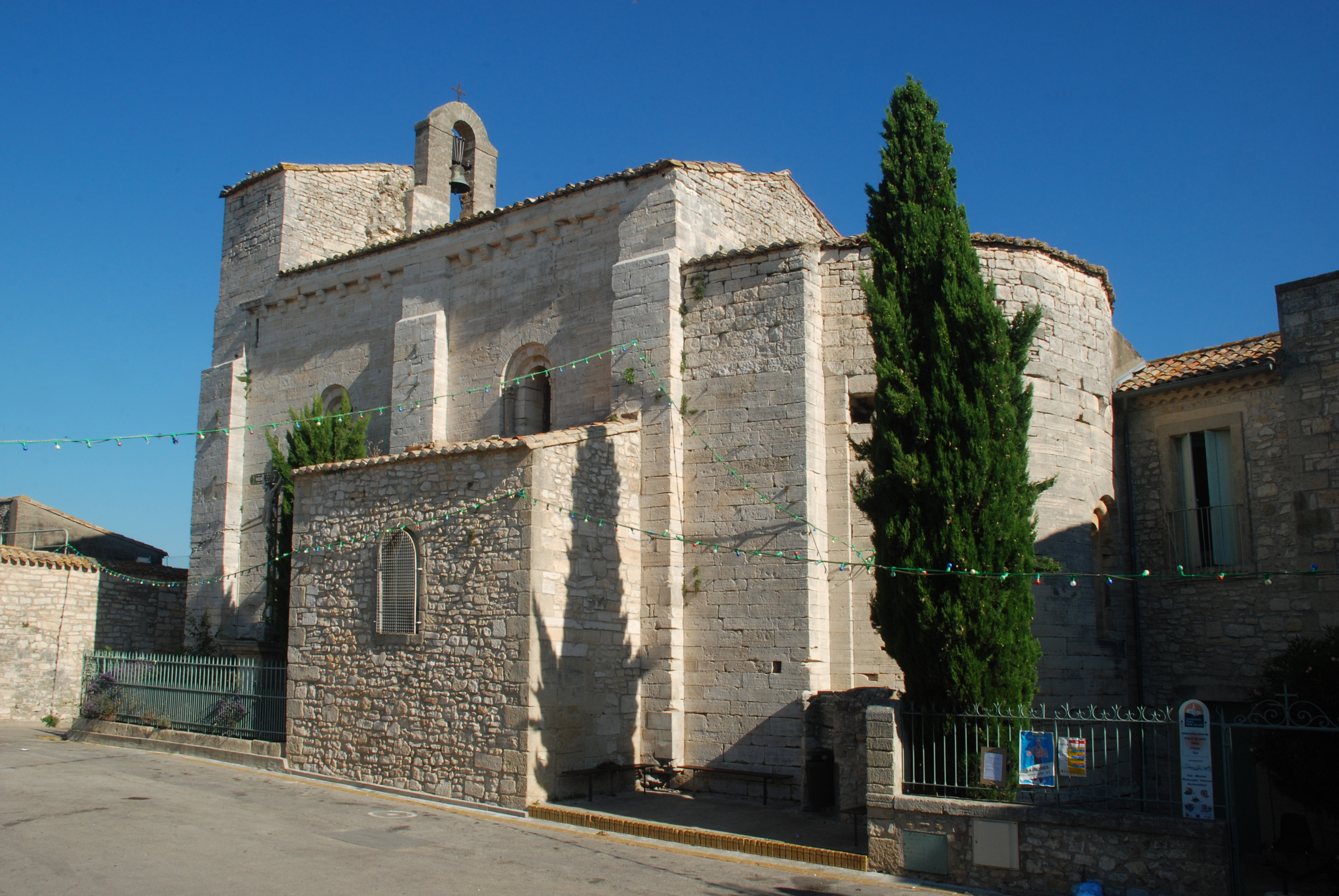
- The church of Saussines

- Coat of arms
- Location of Saussines
- Location within France Location within Occitanie
- Coordinates: 43°45′51″N 4°03′28″E
- Country: France
- Region: Occitania
- Department: Hérault
- Arrondissement: Montpellier
- Canton: Lunel
- Intercommunality: CA Lunel Agglo

Government
  - Mayor (2020–2026): Isabelle de Montgolfier
- Area^{1}: 6.28 km^{2} (2.42 sq mi)
- Elevation: 50 m (160 ft)
- Highest elevation: 76 m (249 ft)
- Lowest elevation: 24 m (79 ft)
- Population (2023): 1,001
  - Density: 159/km^{2} (413/sq mi)
- Time zone: UTC+01:00 (CET)
  - Summer (DST): UTC+02:00 (CEST)
- INSEE/Postal code: 34296 /34160
- ^{1} French Land Register data, which excludes lakes, ponds, glaciers > 1 km^{2} (0.386 sq mi or 247 acres) and river estuaries.

Saussines (French pronunciation: [sosin]; Occitan: Saucinas) is a commune in the Hérault department in the Occitanie region in southern France.

== Population ==
Historical population
Year	Pop.	±% p.a.
1968	306	—
1975	314	+0.37%
1982	404	+3.67%
1990	515	+3.08%
1999	776	+4.66%
2007	883	+1.63%
2012	943	+1.32%
2017	1,033	+1.84%
2023	1,001	−0.52%
Source: INSEE

== See also ==
- Communes of the Hérault department
