= Entre-Vignes =

- Commune
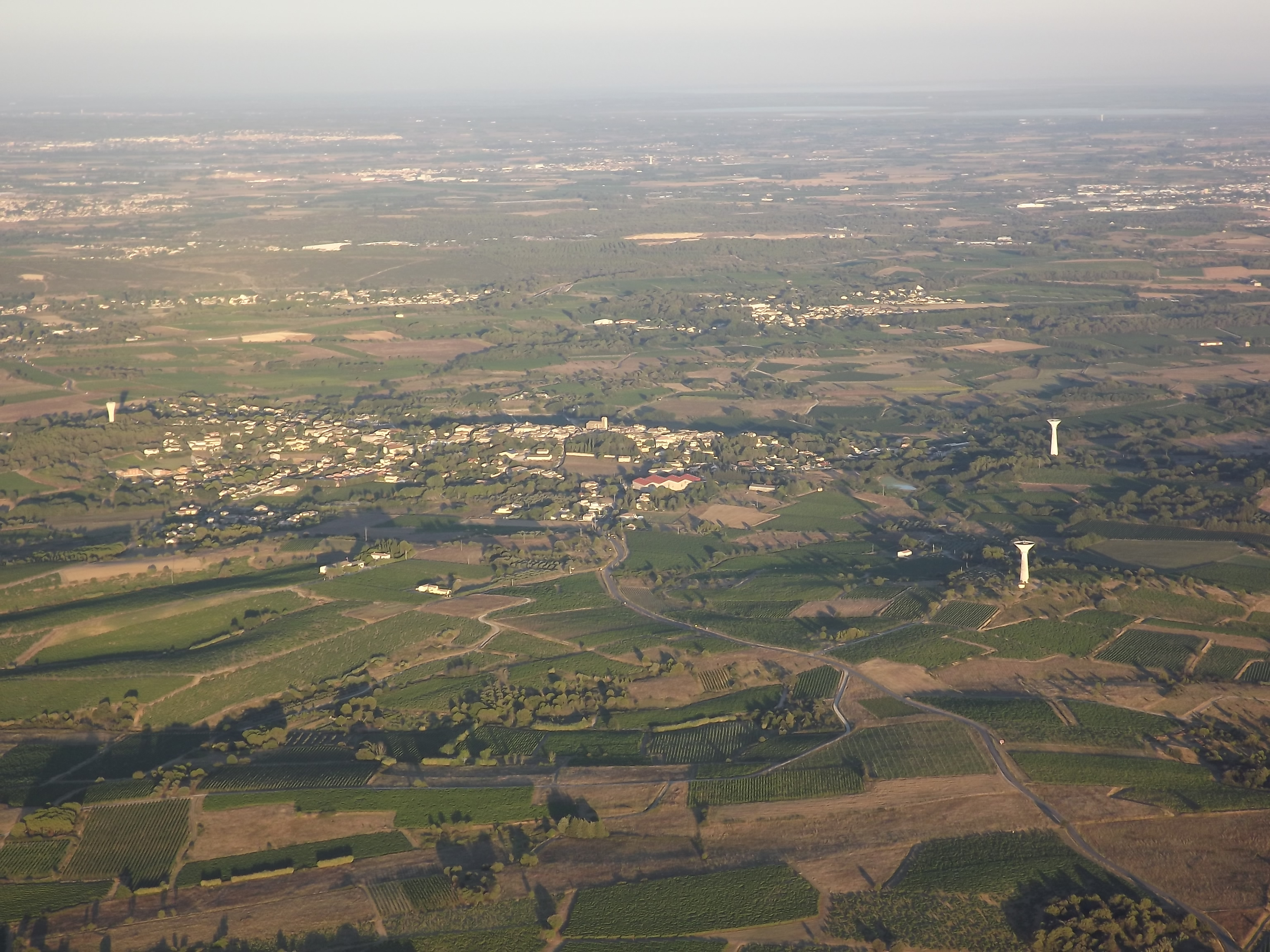
- An aerial view of Saint-Christol
- Location of Entre-Vignes
- Location within France Location within Occitanie
- Coordinates: 43°43′43″N 4°04′50″E
- Country: France
- Region: Occitania
- Department: Hérault
- Arrondissement: Montpellier
- Canton: Lunel
- Intercommunality: CA Lunel Agglo

Government
  - Mayor (2020–2026): Jean-Jacques Esteban
- Area^{1}: 16.80 km^{2} (6.49 sq mi)
- Highest elevation: 92 m (302 ft)
- Lowest elevation: 15 m (49 ft)
- Population (2023): 2,200
  - Density: 130/km^{2} (340/sq mi)
- Time zone: UTC+01:00 (CET)
  - Summer (DST): UTC+02:00 (CEST)
- INSEE/Postal code: 34246 /34400
- ^{1} French Land Register data, which excludes lakes, ponds, glaciers > 1 km^{2} (0.386 sq mi or 247 acres) and river estuaries.

Entre-Vignes (French pronunciation: [ɑ̃tʁ viɲ]) is a commune in the Hérault department in the Occitanie region in southern France. It was established on 1 January 2019 by merger of the former communes of Saint-Christol (the seat) and Vérargues.

== Population ==
Population data refer to the commune in its geography as of January 2025.

Historical population
Year	Pop.	±% p.a.
1968	990	—
1975	1,029	+0.55%
1982	1,106	+1.04%
1990	1,600	+4.72%
1999	1,661	+0.42%
2007	2,005	+2.38%
2012	2,174	+1.63%
2017	2,136	−0.35%
2023	2,200	+0.49%
Source: INSEE

== See also ==
- Communes of the Hérault department
