= Galargues =

- Commune
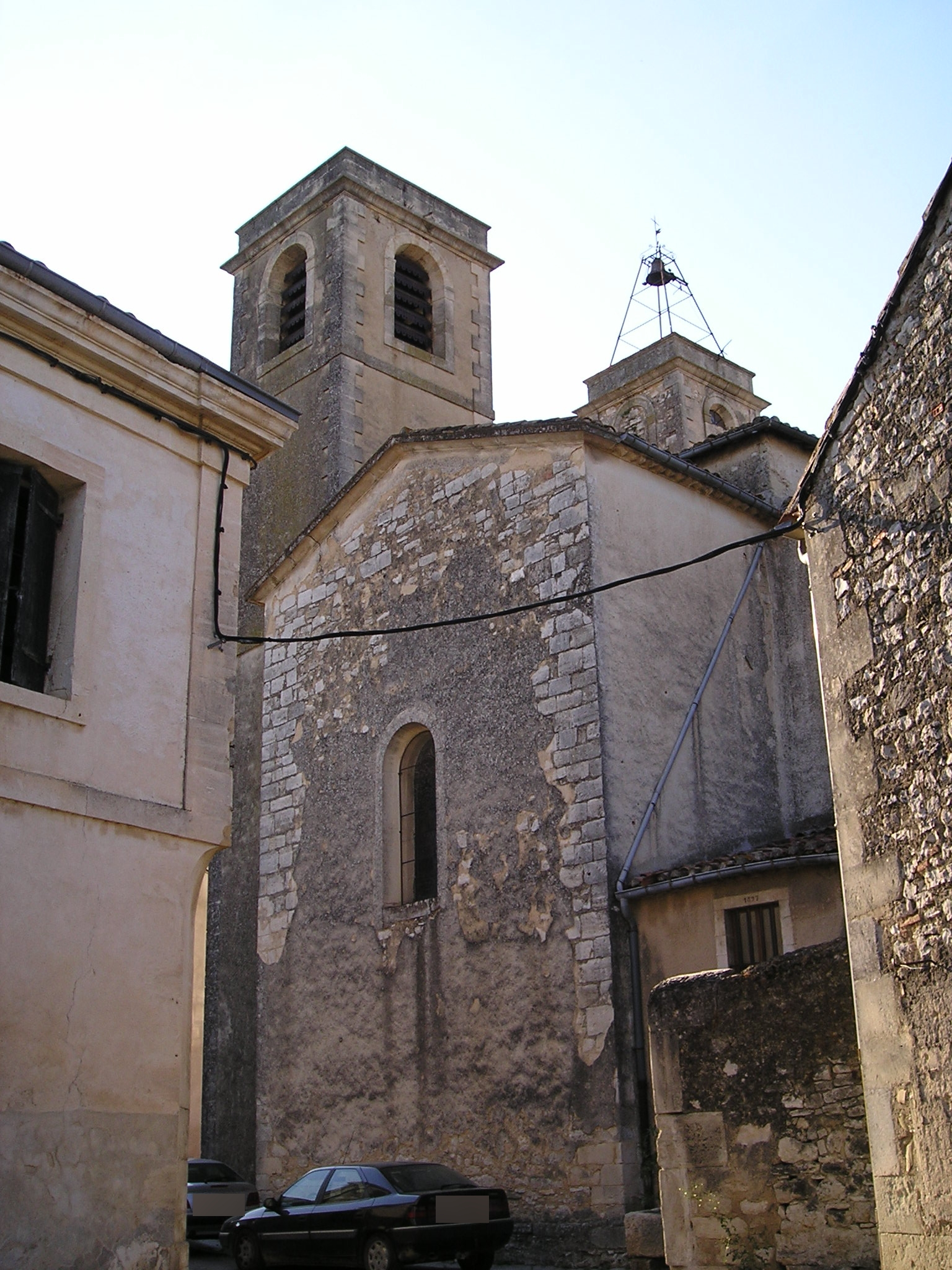
- The church of Notre-Dame-de-l'Assomption

- Coat of arms
- Location of Galargues
- Location within France Location within Occitanie
- Coordinates: 43°46′17″N 4°01′19″E
- Country: France
- Region: Occitania
- Department: Hérault
- Arrondissement: Montpellier
- Canton: Lunel
- Intercommunality: CA Lunel Agglo

Government
  - Mayor (2020–2026): Denis Devriendt
- Area^{1}: 11.43 km^{2} (4.41 sq mi)
- Elevation: 54 m (177 ft)
- Highest elevation: 257 m (843 ft)
- Lowest elevation: 29 m (95 ft)
- Population (2023): 752
  - Density: 65.8/km^{2} (170/sq mi)
- Time zone: UTC+01:00 (CET)
  - Summer (DST): UTC+02:00 (CEST)
- INSEE/Postal code: 34110 /34160
- ^{1} French Land Register data, which excludes lakes, ponds, glaciers > 1 km^{2} (0.386 sq mi or 247 acres) and river estuaries.

Galargues (French pronunciation: [ɡalaʁɡ]) is a commune in the Hérault département in Occitanie in southern France.

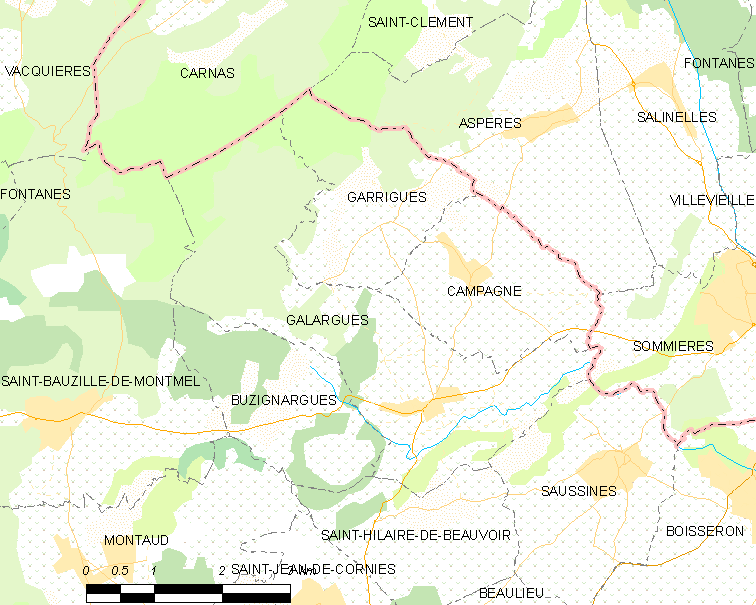
Map

== Population ==
Historical population
Year	Pop.	±% p.a.
1968	279	—
1975	253	−1.39%
1982	342	+4.40%
1990	404	+2.10%
1999	519	+2.82%
2007	618	+2.21%
2012	656	+1.20%
2017	725	+2.02%
2023	752	+0.61%
Source: INSEE

== See also ==
- Communes of the Hérault department
