= Saint-Just, Hérault =

Saint-Just
- Commune
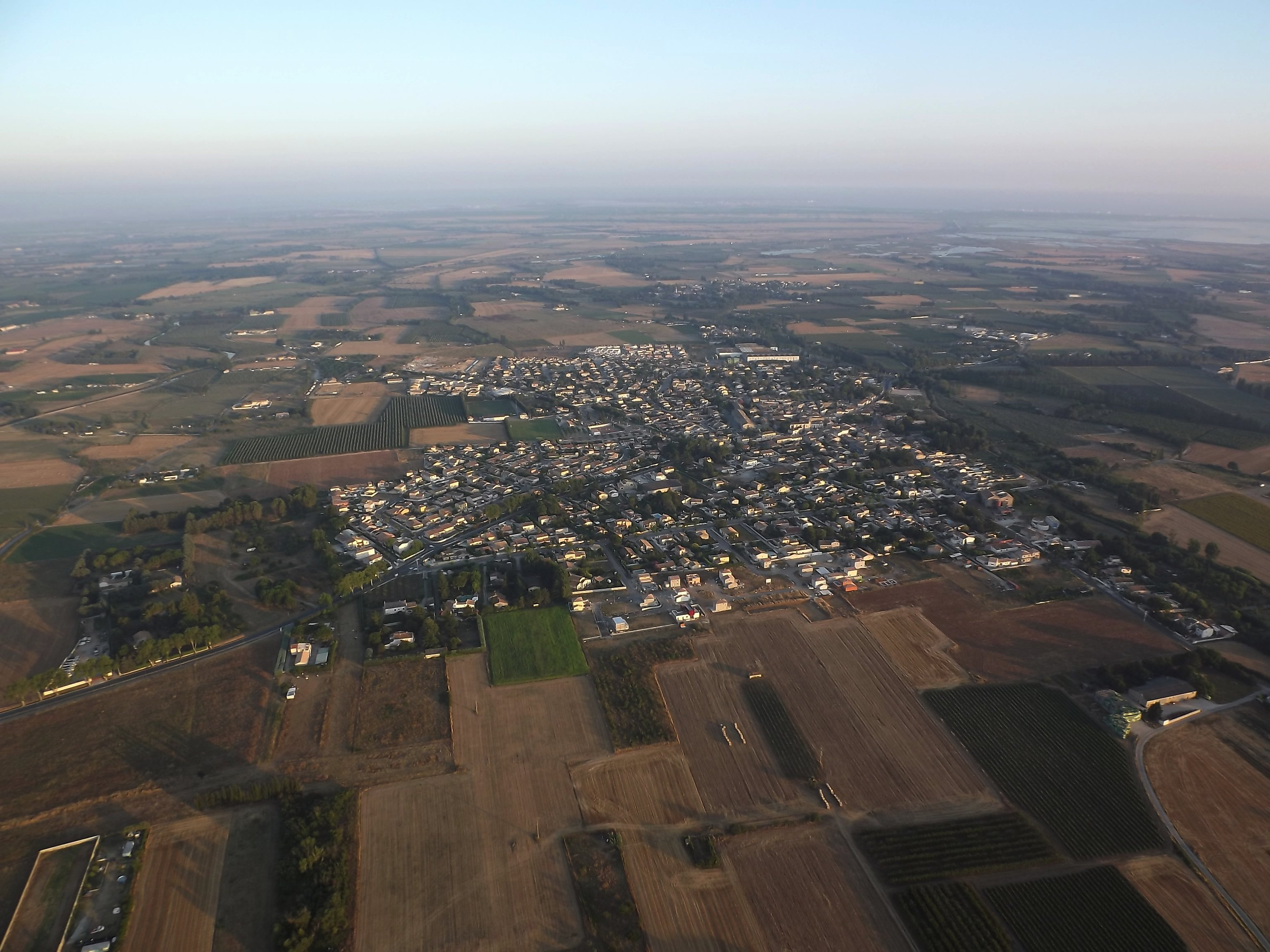
- An aerial view of Saint-Just

- Coat of arms
- Location of Saint-Just
- Location within France Location within Occitanie
- Coordinates: 43°39′29″N 4°06′53″E
- Country: France
- Region: Occitania
- Department: Hérault
- Arrondissement: Montpellier
- Canton: Lunel
- Intercommunality: CA Lunel Agglo

Government
  - Mayor (2022–2026): Yves Quesada
- Area^{1}: 6.08 km^{2} (2.35 sq mi)
- Elevation: 10 m (33 ft)
- Highest elevation: 9 m (30 ft)
- Lowest elevation: 2 m (6.6 ft)
- Population (2023): 3,293
  - Density: 542/km^{2} (1,400/sq mi)
- Time zone: UTC+01:00 (CET)
  - Summer (DST): UTC+02:00 (CEST)
- INSEE/Postal code: 34272 /34400
- ^{1} French Land Register data, which excludes lakes, ponds, glaciers > 1 km^{2} (0.386 sq mi or 247 acres) and river estuaries.

Saint-Just (French pronunciation: [sɛ̃ ʒyst]; Provençal: Sant Just) is a commune in the Hérault department in the Occitanie region in southern France.

== Population ==
Historical population
Year	Pop.	±% p.a.
1968	544	—
1975	581	+0.94%
1982	1,034	+8.58%
1990	1,568	+5.34%
1999	2,493	+5.29%
2007	2,651	+0.77%
2012	2,867	+1.58%
2017	3,255	+2.57%
2023	3,293	+0.19%
Source: INSEE

== See also ==
- Communes of the Hérault department
