= Saint-Sériès =

- Commune
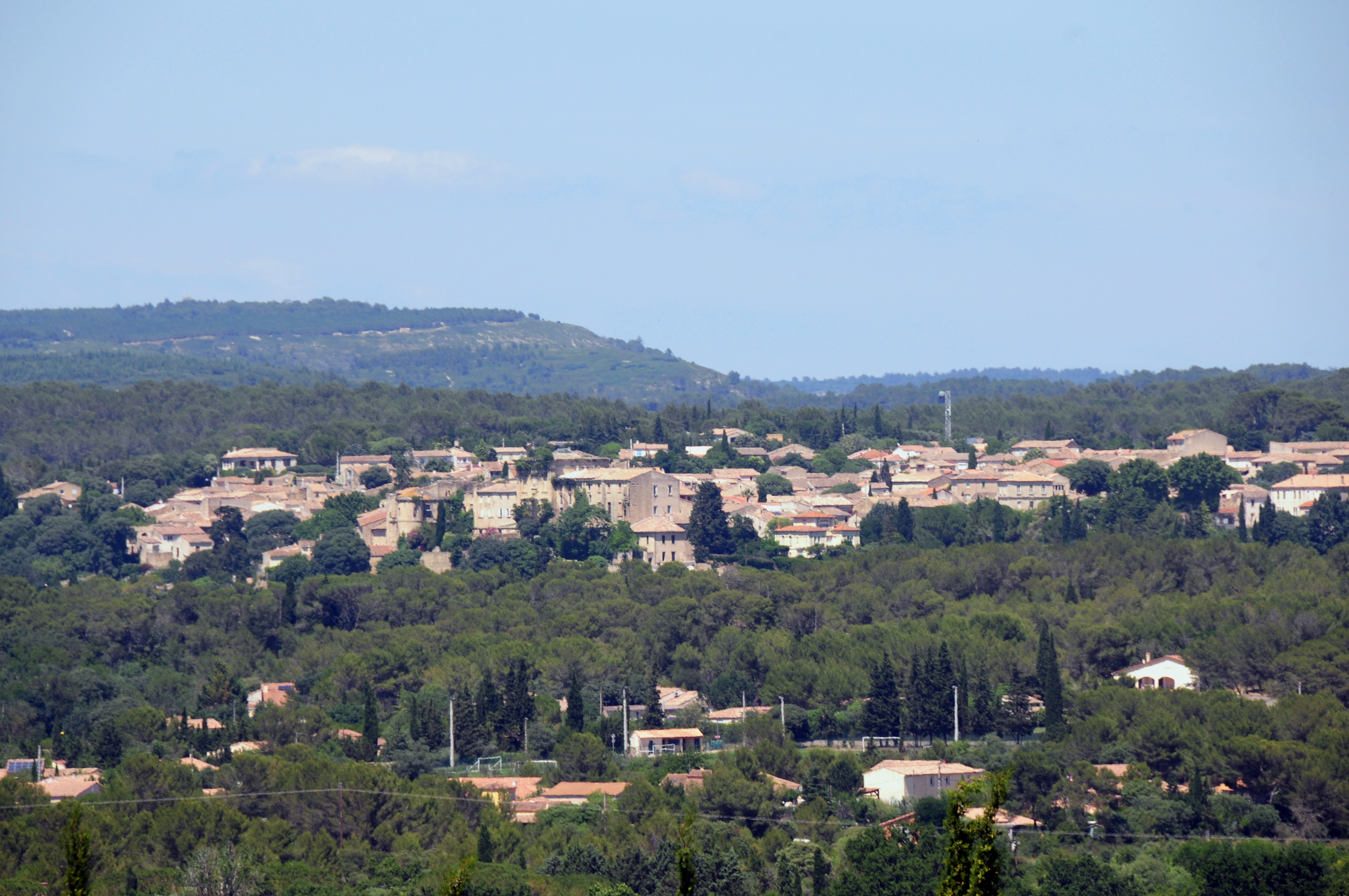

- Coat of arms
- Location of Saint-Sériès
- Location within France Location within Occitanie
- Coordinates: 43°43′58″N 4°06′22″E
- Country: France
- Region: Occitania
- Department: Hérault
- Arrondissement: Montpellier
- Canton: Lunel
- Intercommunality: CA Lunel Agglo

Government
  - Mayor (2023–2026): Yves Person
- Area^{1}: 4.56 km^{2} (1.76 sq mi)
- Elevation: 37 m (121 ft)
- Highest elevation: 68 m (223 ft)
- Lowest elevation: 14 m (46 ft)
- Population (2023): 972
  - Density: 213/km^{2} (552/sq mi)
- Time zone: UTC+01:00 (CET)
  - Summer (DST): UTC+02:00 (CEST)
- INSEE/Postal code: 34288 /34400
- ^{1} French Land Register data, which excludes lakes, ponds, glaciers > 1 km^{2} (0.386 sq mi or 247 acres) and river estuaries.

Saint-Sériès (French pronunciation: [sɛ̃ seʁjɛs]; Occitan: Sanch Erièg) is a commune in the Hérault department in the Occitanie region in southern France.

== Population ==
Historical population
Year	Pop.	±% p.a.
1968	230	—
1975	224	−0.38%
1982	358	+6.93%
1990	448	+2.84%
1999	583	+2.97%
2007	856	+4.92%
2012	846	−0.23%
2017	983	+3.05%
2023	972	−0.19%
Source: INSEE

== See also ==
- Communes of the Hérault department
