= Saturargues =

- Commune
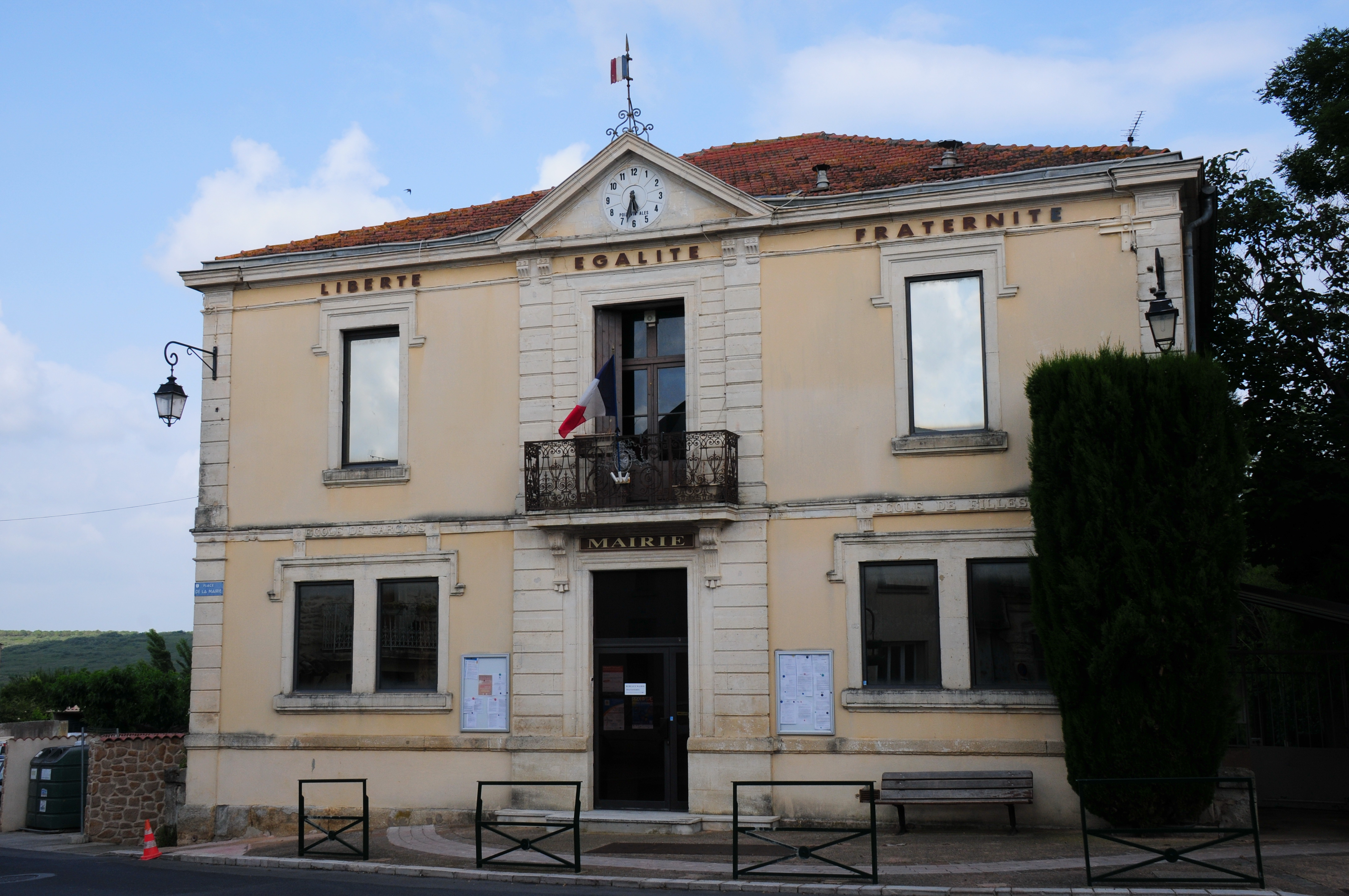
- Town hall

- Coat of arms
- Location of Saturargues
- Location within France Location within Occitanie
- Coordinates: 43°43′24″N 4°06′51″E
- Country: France
- Region: Occitania
- Department: Hérault
- Arrondissement: Montpellier
- Canton: Lunel
- Intercommunality: CA Lunel Agglo

Government
  - Mayor (2020–2026): Martine Dubayle-Calbano
- Area^{1}: 5.99 km^{2} (2.31 sq mi)
- Elevation: 40 m (130 ft)
- Highest elevation: 68 m (223 ft)
- Lowest elevation: 16 m (52 ft)
- Population (2023): 1,022
  - Density: 171/km^{2} (442/sq mi)
- Time zone: UTC+01:00 (CET)
  - Summer (DST): UTC+02:00 (CEST)
- INSEE/Postal code: 34294 /34400
- ^{1} French Land Register data, which excludes lakes, ponds, glaciers > 1 km^{2} (0.386 sq mi or 247 acres) and river estuaries.

Saturargues (French pronunciation: [satyʁaʁɡ]) is a commune in the Hérault department in the Occitanie region in southern France.

== Population ==
Historical population
Year	Pop.	±% p.a.
1968	253	—
1975	275	+1.20%
1982	291	+0.81%
1990	461	+5.92%
1999	596	+2.89%
2007	835	+4.30%
2012	906	+1.65%
2017	971	+1.40%
2023	1,022	+0.86%
Source: INSEE

== See also ==
- Communes of the Hérault department
