= Campagne, Hérault =

Campagne
- Commune
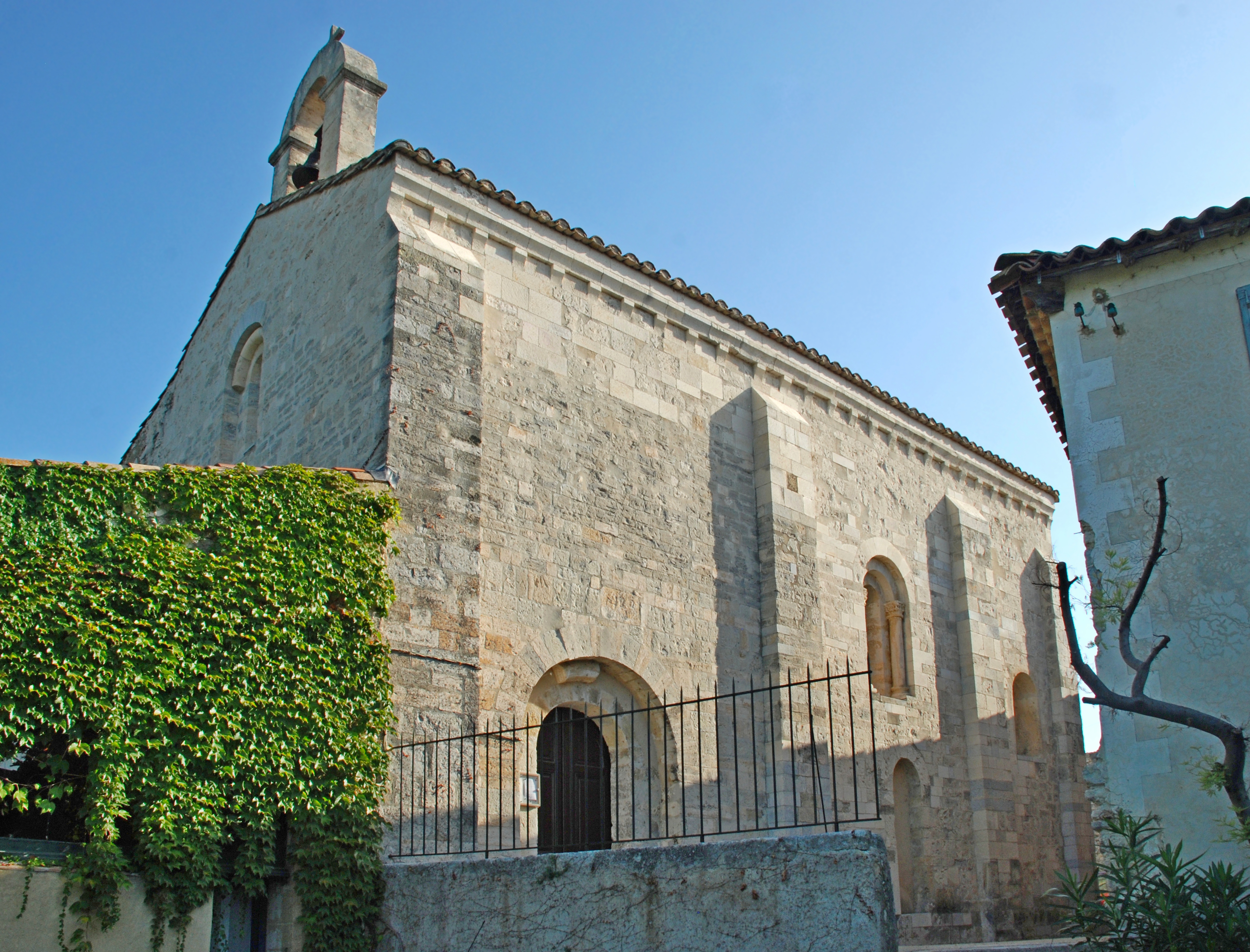
- The church of Saint-Martin

- Coat of arms
- Location of Campagne
- Location within France Location within Occitanie
- Coordinates: 43°47′18″N 4°01′48″E
- Country: France
- Region: Occitania
- Department: Hérault
- Arrondissement: Montpellier
- Canton: Lunel
- Intercommunality: CA Lunel Agglo

Government
  - Mayor (2020–2026): Jacques Gravegeal
- Area^{1}: 4.84 km^{2} (1.87 sq mi)
- Elevation: 30 m (98 ft)
- Highest elevation: 86 m (282 ft)
- Lowest elevation: 35 m (115 ft)
- Population (2023): 318
  - Density: 65.7/km^{2} (170/sq mi)
- Time zone: UTC+01:00 (CET)
  - Summer (DST): UTC+02:00 (CEST)
- INSEE/Postal code: 34048 /34160
- ^{1} French Land Register data, which excludes lakes, ponds, glaciers > 1 km^{2} (0.386 sq mi or 247 acres) and river estuaries.

Campagne (French pronunciation: [kɑ̃paɲ]; Occitan: Campanha) is a commune in the Hérault department in southern France.

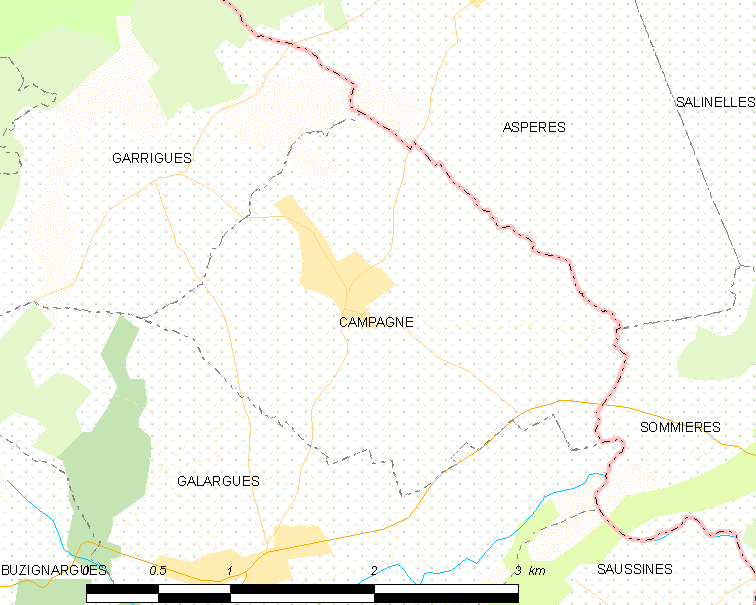
Map

== Population ==
Historical population
Year	Pop.	±% p.a.
1968	159	—
1975	134	−2.41%
1982	122	−1.33%
1990	182	+5.13%
1999	233	+2.78%
2007	264	+1.57%
2012	287	+1.68%
2017	316	+1.94%
2023	318	+0.11%
Source: INSEE

== See also ==
- Communes of the Hérault department
