= Lunel-Viel =

- Commune
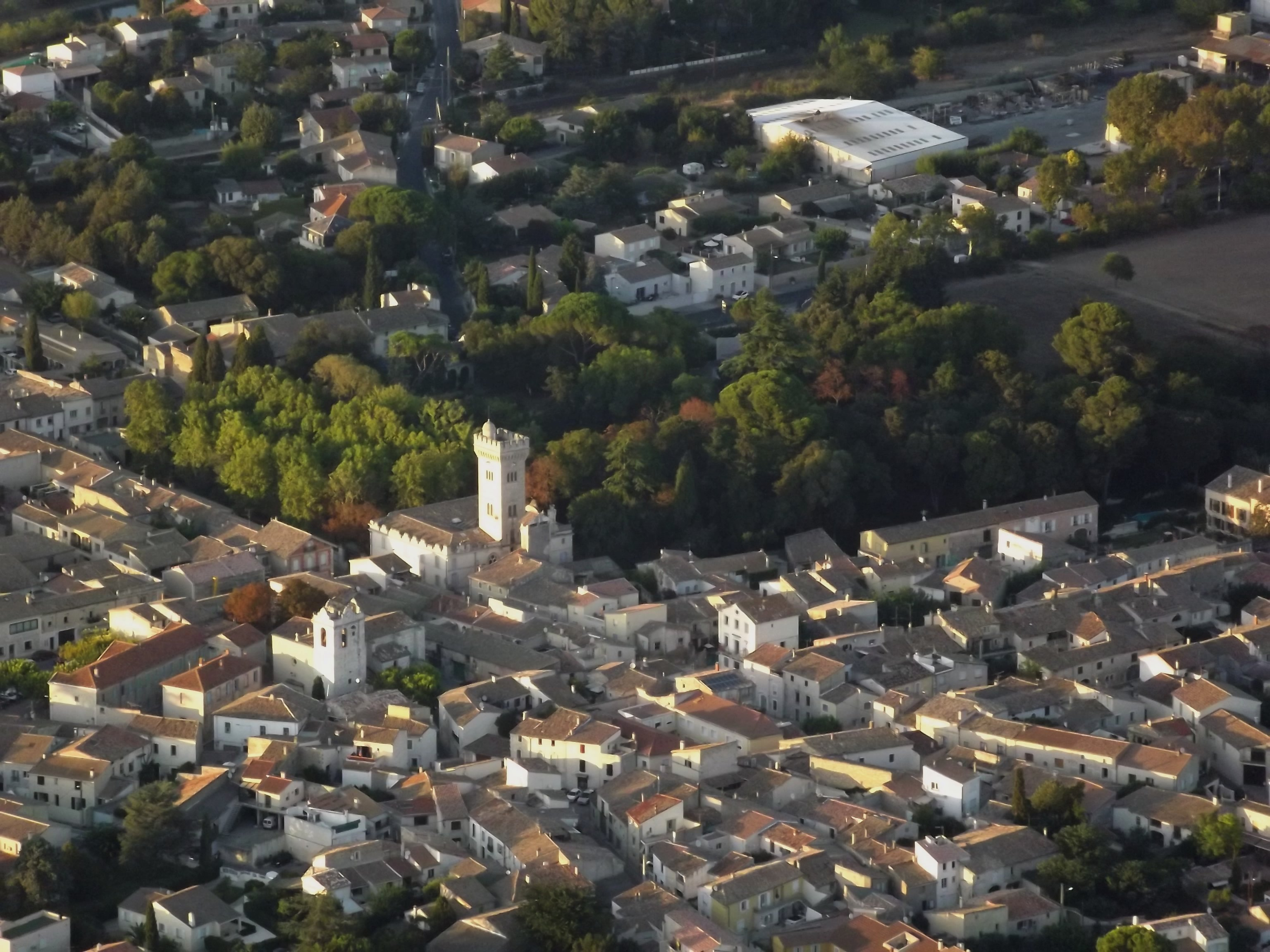
- An aerial view of Lunel-Viel

- Coat of arms
- Location of Lunel-Viel
- Location within France Location within Occitanie
- Coordinates: 43°40′44″N 4°05′33″E
- Country: France
- Region: Occitania
- Department: Hérault
- Arrondissement: Montpellier
- Canton: Lunel
- Intercommunality: CA Lunel Agglo

Government
  - Mayor (2020–2026): Fabrice Fenoy
- Area^{1}: 11.97 km^{2} (4.62 sq mi)
- Elevation: 17 m (56 ft)
- Highest elevation: 50 m (160 ft)
- Lowest elevation: 6 m (20 ft)
- Population (2023): 4,507
  - Density: 376.5/km^{2} (975.2/sq mi)
- Time zone: UTC+01:00 (CET)
  - Summer (DST): UTC+02:00 (CEST)
- INSEE/Postal code: 34146 /34400
- ^{1} French Land Register data, which excludes lakes, ponds, glaciers > 1 km^{2} (0.386 sq mi or 247 acres) and river estuaries.

Lunel-Viel (French pronunciation: [lynɛl vjɛl]; Occitan: Lunèl Vièlh, literally: "old Lunel") is a commune in the Hérault department in southern France. Lunel-Viel station has rail connections to Narbonne, Montpellier and Avignon.

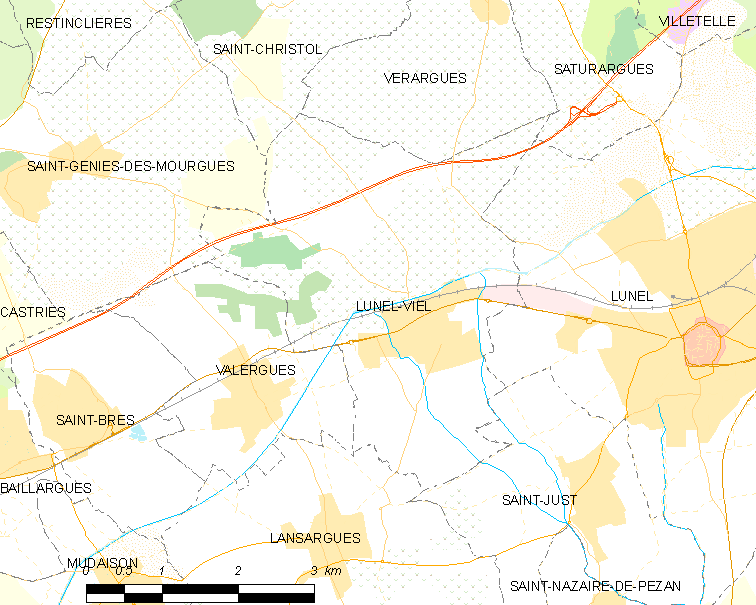
Map

== Population ==
Historical population
| Year | Pop. | ±% p.a. |
|---|---|---|
| 1968 | 1,418 | — |
| 1975 | 1,331 | −0.90% |
| 1982 | 1,673 | +3.32% |
| 1990 | 2,301 | +4.06% |
| 1999 | 3,174 | +3.64% |
| 2007 | 3,529 | +1.33% |
| 2012 | 3,751 | +1.23% |
| 2017 | 3,932 | +0.95% |
| 2023 | 4,507 | +2.30% |
Source: INSEE

== See also ==
- Communes of the Hérault department
