= Saint-Nazaire-de-Pézan =

- Commune
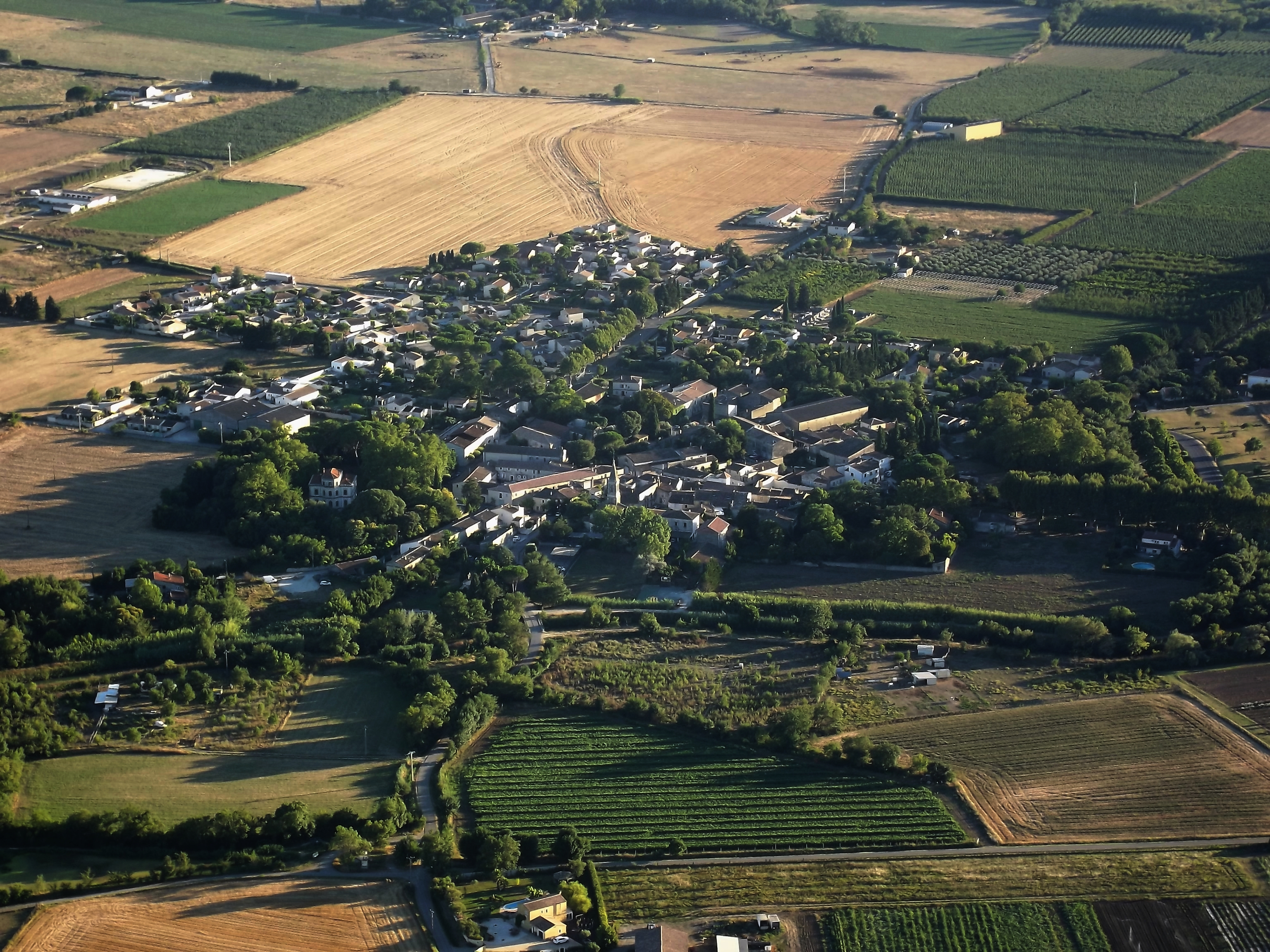
- Aerial view of Saint-Nazaire-de-Pézan

- Coat of arms
- Location of Saint-Nazaire-de-Pézan
- Location within France Location within Occitanie
- Coordinates: 43°38′38″N 4°07′11″E
- Country: France
- Region: Occitania
- Department: Hérault
- Arrondissement: Montpellier
- Canton: Lunel
- Intercommunality: CA Lunel Agglo

Government
  - Mayor (2020–2026): Christophe Calvet
- Area^{1}: 5.66 km^{2} (2.19 sq mi)
- Elevation: 8 m (26 ft)
- Highest elevation: 5 m (16 ft)
- Lowest elevation: 0 m (0 ft)
- Population (2023): 625
  - Density: 110/km^{2} (286/sq mi)
- Time zone: UTC+01:00 (CET)
  - Summer (DST): UTC+02:00 (CEST)
- INSEE/Postal code: 34280 /34400
- ^{1} French Land Register data, which excludes lakes, ponds, glaciers > 1 km^{2} (0.386 sq mi or 247 acres) and river estuaries.

Saint-Nazaire-de-Pézan (French: [sɛ̃ nazɛːʁ də pezɑ̃]; Occitan: Sant Nazari de Pesan) is a commune in the Hérault department in the Occitanie region in southern France.

== Population ==
Historical population
Year	Pop.	±% p.a.
1968	224	—
1975	200	−1.61%
1982	278	+4.82%
1990	469	+6.76%
1999	539	+1.56%
2007	551	+0.28%
2012	576	+0.89%
2017	626	+1.68%
2023	625	−0.03%
Source: INSEE

== See also ==
- Communes of the Hérault department
