= Canton of Sète =

Coordinates: 43.40°N 3.69°E

Sète
- Canton
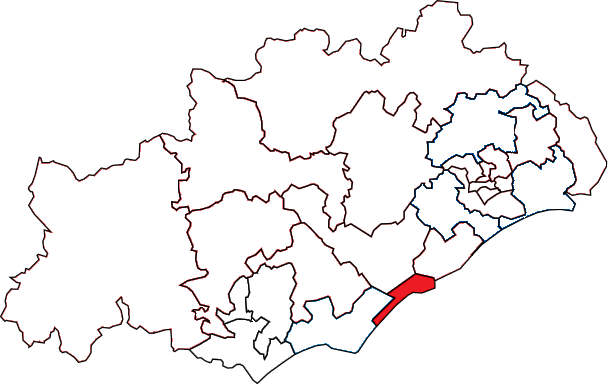
- Interactive map of Sète
- Country: France
- Region: Occitania
- Department: Hérault
- No. of communes: {{{nbcomm}}}

Government
  - Representatives (2021–2028): Gabriel Blasco; Véronique Calueba
- Area: 24.21 km^{2} (9.35 sq mi)
- Population (2023): 45,337
  - Density: 1,873/km^{2} (4,850/sq mi)
- INSEE code: 34 25

The canton of Sète is an administrative division of the Hérault department, southern France. It was created at the French canton reorganisation which came into effect in March 2015. Its seat is in Sète.

== Composition ==
It consists of the following communes:

1. Sète

== Councillors ==
Election	Councillors	Party	Occupation
2015	Véronique Calueba-Rizzolo	FG	Councillor of Sète
2015	François Liberti	PCF	Councillor of Sète; Former Mayor of Sète; Former Member of the French National Assembly for Hérault
2016	Sébastien Andral	PCF	Councillor of Sète
2021	Gabriel Blasco	PCF	Head of medico-social service
2021	Véronique Calueba-Rizzolo	PCF	Councillor of Sète

- In March 2016, François Liberti resigns. He is replaced by his substitute, Sébastien Andral.

== Pictures of the canton ==
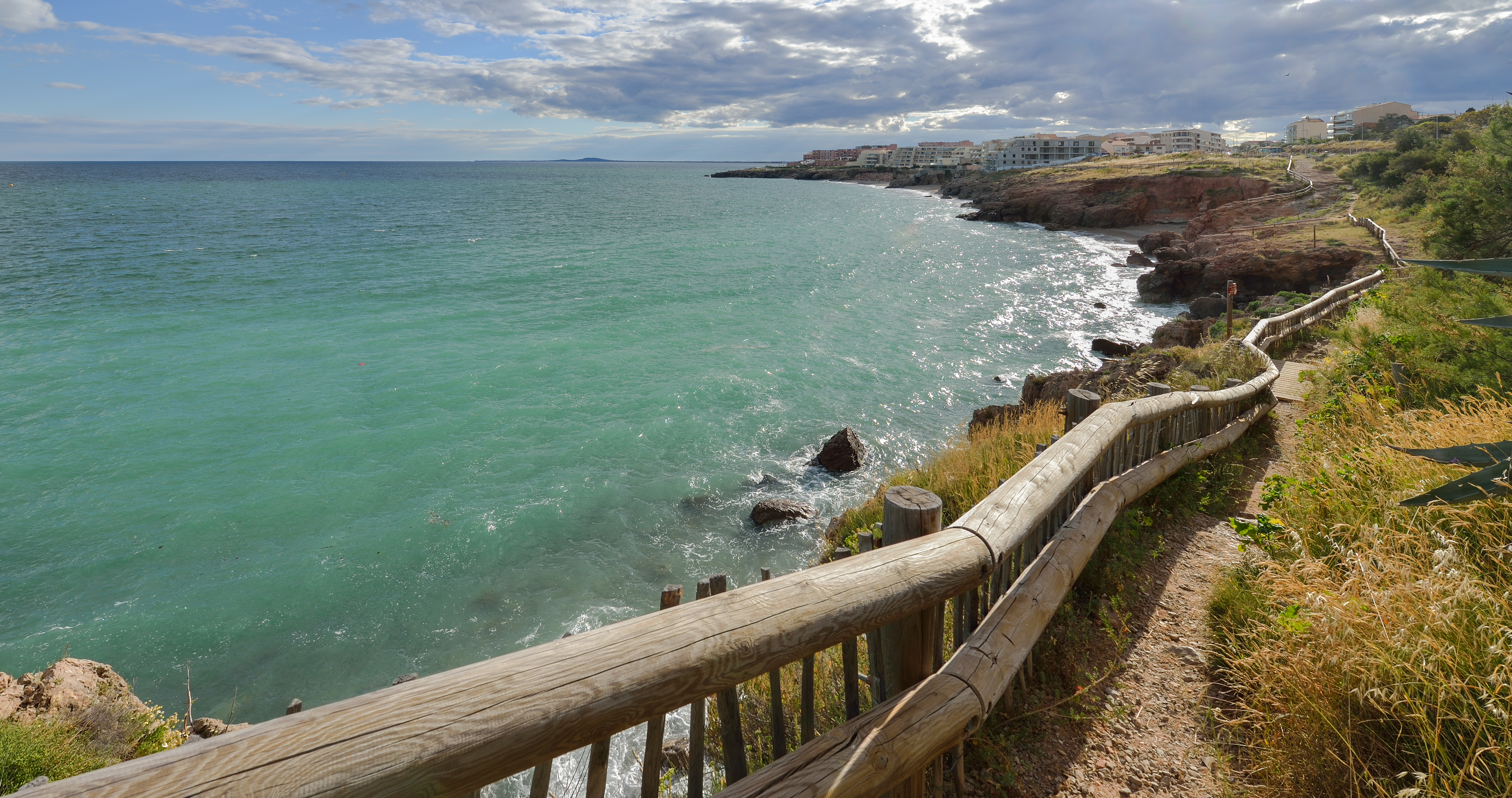
Crique de l'Anau

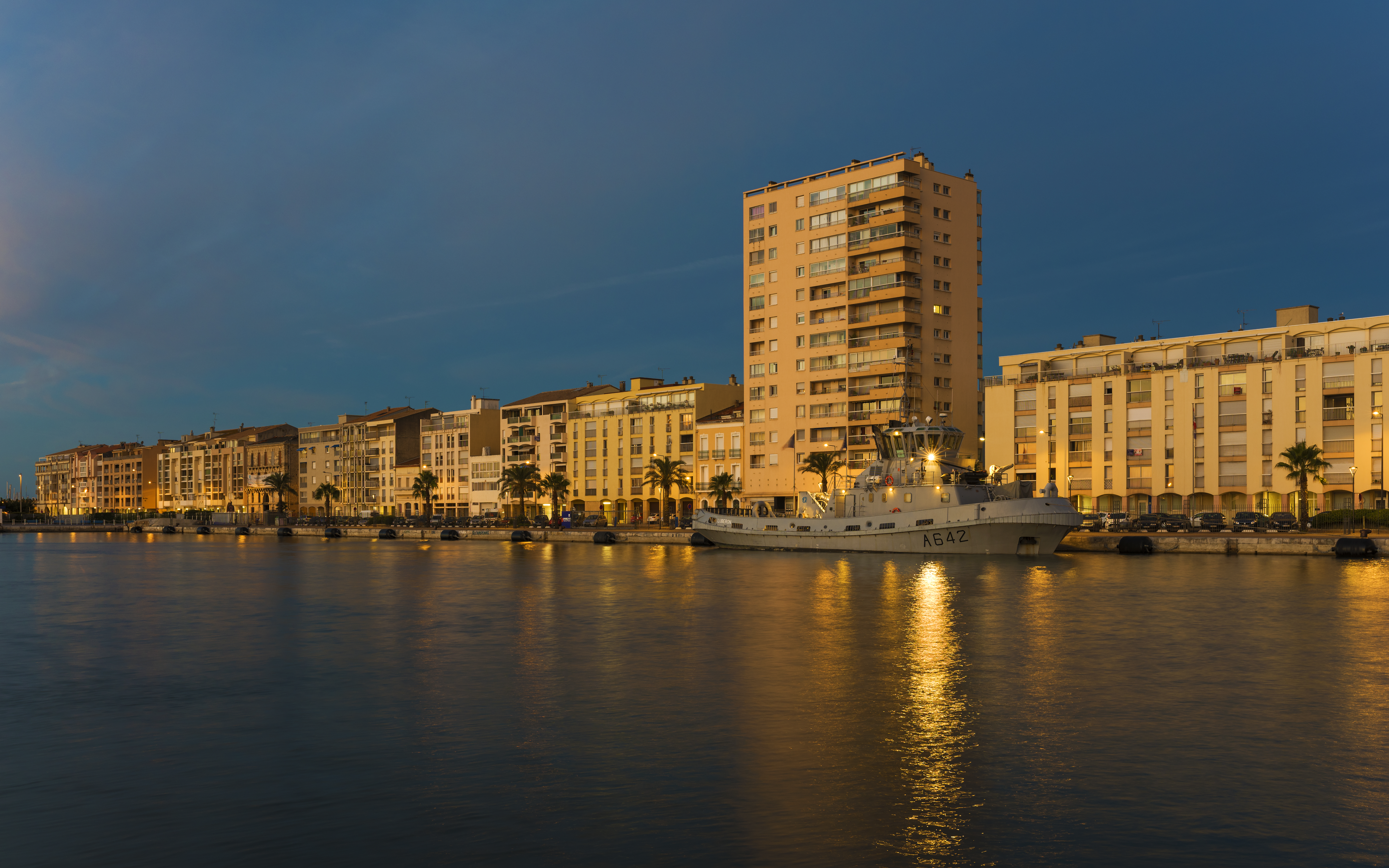
The Algiers Embankment

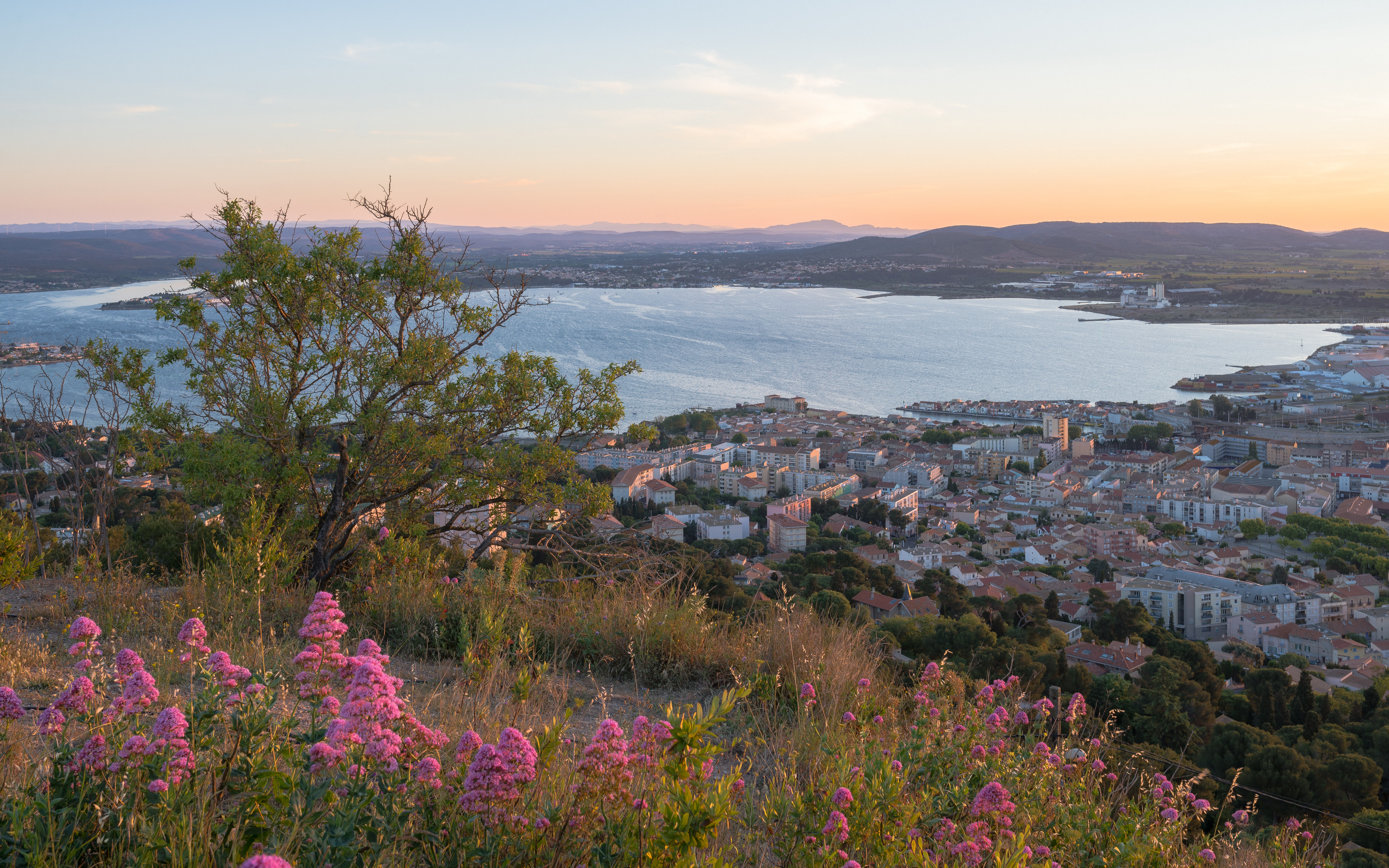
View of Sète
