= Grabels =

- Commune
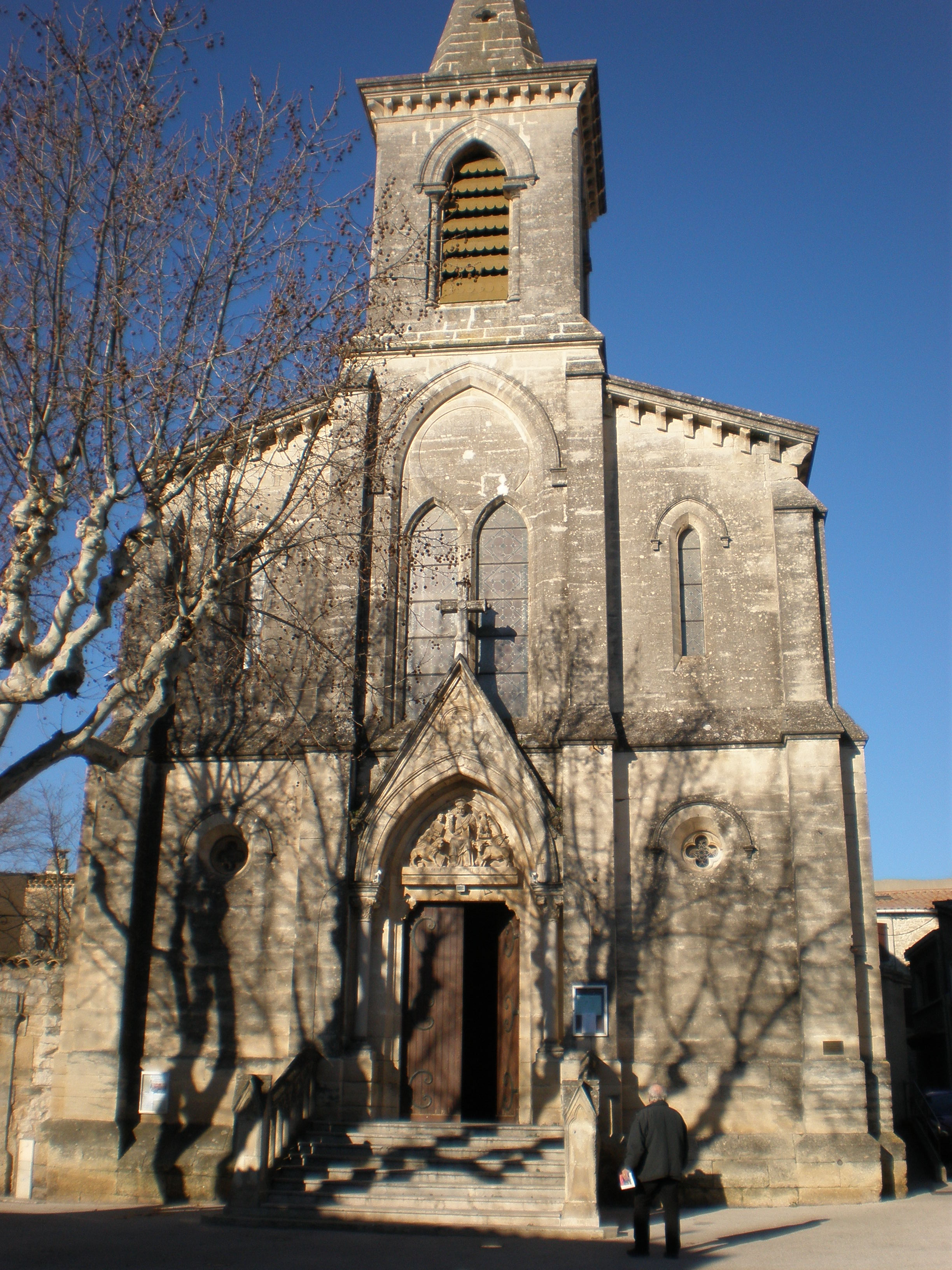
- Church

- Coat of arms
- Location of Grabels
- Location within France Location within Occitanie
- Coordinates: 43°38′55″N 3°48′09″E
- Country: France
- Region: Occitania
- Department: Hérault
- Arrondissement: Montpellier
- Canton: Montpellier-1
- Intercommunality: Montpellier Méditerranée Métropole

Government
  - Mayor (2020–2026): René Revol (DVG)
- Area^{1}: 16.24 km^{2} (6.27 sq mi)
- Elevation: 68 m (223 ft)
- Highest elevation: 167 m (548 ft)
- Lowest elevation: 50 m (160 ft)
- Population (2023): 9,092
  - Density: 559.9/km^{2} (1,450/sq mi)
- Time zone: UTC+01:00 (CET)
  - Summer (DST): UTC+02:00 (CEST)
- INSEE/Postal code: 34116 /34790
- ^{1} French Land Register data, which excludes lakes, ponds, glaciers > 1 km^{2} (0.386 sq mi or 247 acres) and river estuaries.

Grabels (French pronunciation: [ɡʁabɛl]; Occitan: Grabèls) is a commune in the Hérault département in the Occitanie region in southern France. It is located on the north west of Montpellier.

== Population ==
Historical population
Year	Pop.	±% p.a.
1968	1,020	—
1975	1,537	+6.03%
1982	2,527	+7.36%
1990	3,130	+2.71%
1999	5,438	+6.33%
2007	6,025	+1.29%
2012	6,698	+2.14%
2017	8,430	+4.71%
2023	9,092	+1.27%
Source: INSEE

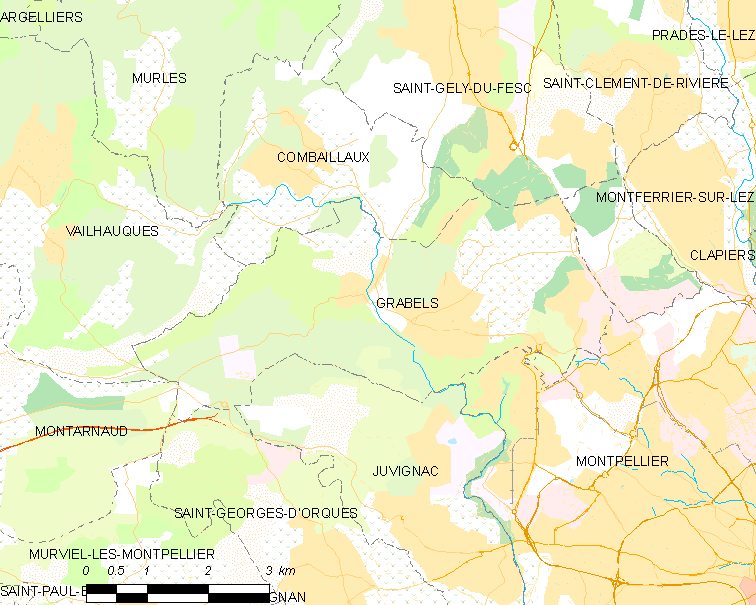
Map

== See also ==
- Communes of the Hérault department
