= Boisseron =

- Commune
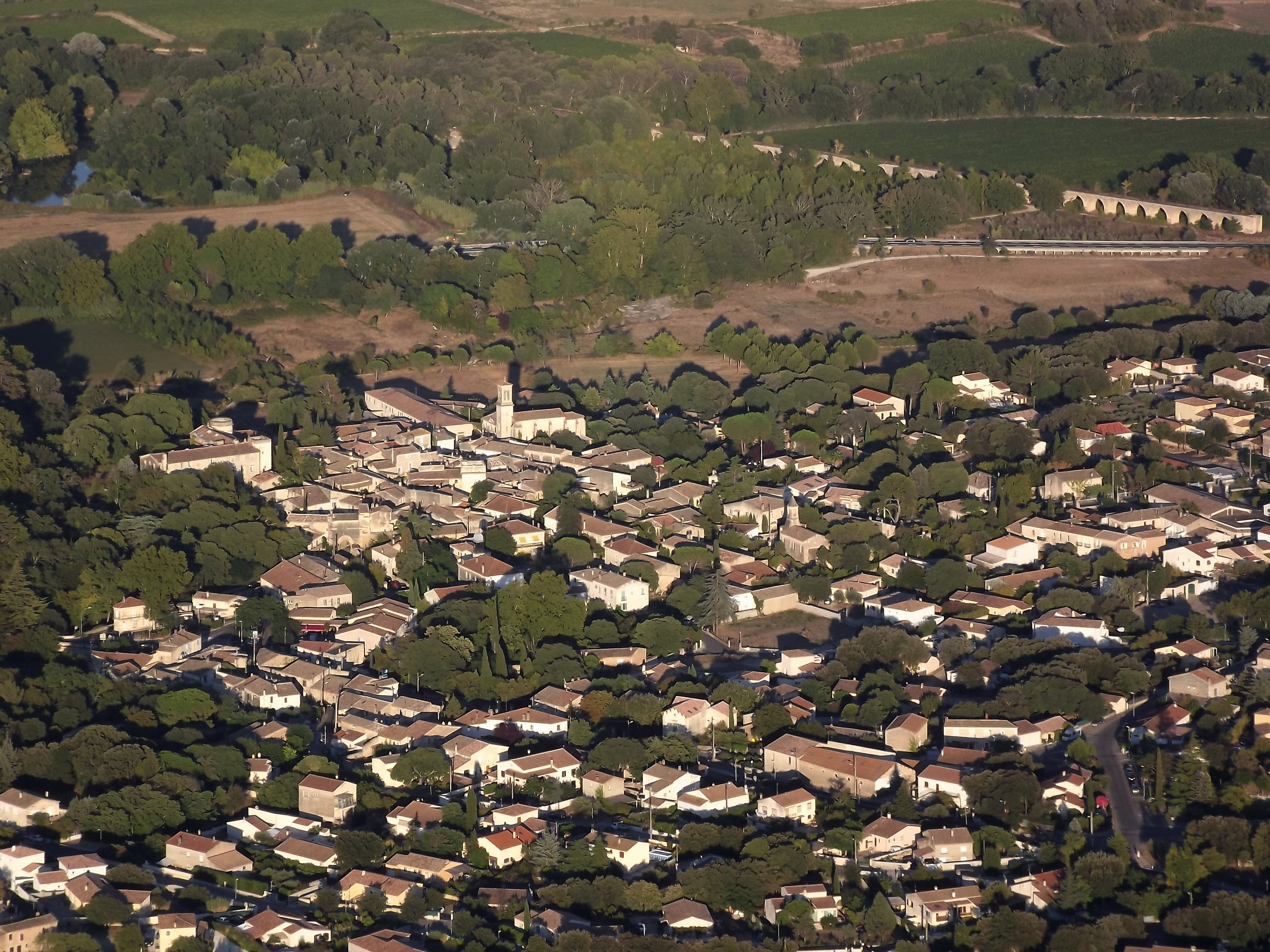
- An aerial view of Boisseron

- Coat of arms
- Location of Boisseron
- Location within France Location within Occitanie
- Coordinates: 43°45′38″N 4°04′55″E
- Country: France
- Region: Occitania
- Department: Hérault
- Arrondissement: Montpellier
- Canton: Lunel
- Intercommunality: CA Lunel Agglo

Government
  - Mayor (2020–2026): Loïc Fataccioli
- Area^{1}: 7.46 km^{2} (2.88 sq mi)
- Elevation: 32 m (105 ft)
- Highest elevation: 77 m (253 ft)
- Lowest elevation: 19 m (62 ft)
- Population (2023): 2,185
  - Density: 293/km^{2} (759/sq mi)
- Time zone: UTC+01:00 (CET)
  - Summer (DST): UTC+02:00 (CEST)
- INSEE/Postal code: 34033 /34160
- ^{1} French Land Register data, which excludes lakes, ponds, glaciers > 1 km^{2} (0.386 sq mi or 247 acres) and river estuaries.

Boisseron (French pronunciation: [bwasʁɔ̃]) is a commune in the Hérault department in the Occitanie region in southern France.

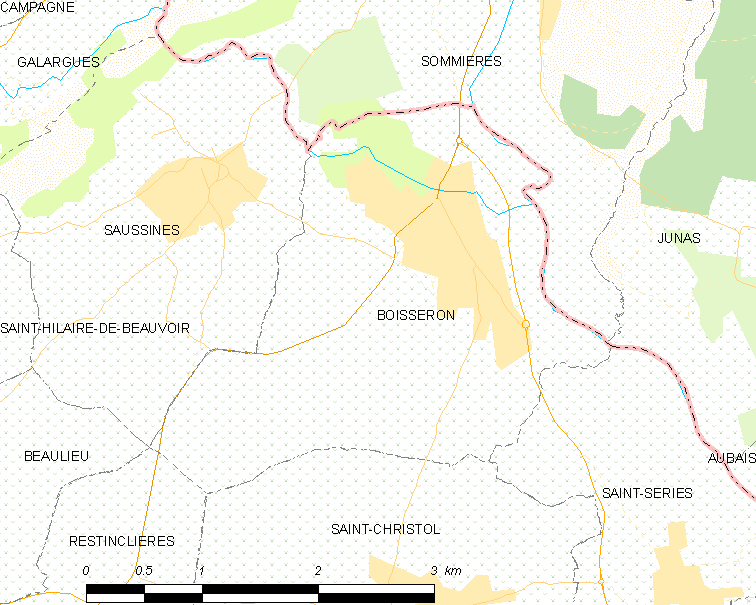
Map

== Population ==
Historical population
Year	Pop.	±% p.a.
1968	583	—
1975	643	+1.41%
1982	864	+4.31%
1990	981	+1.60%
1999	1,151	+1.79%
2007	1,359	+2.10%
2012	1,884	+6.75%
2017	1,989	+1.09%
2023	2,185	+1.58%
Source: INSEE

== See also ==
- Communes of the Hérault department
