= Marsillargues =

- Commune
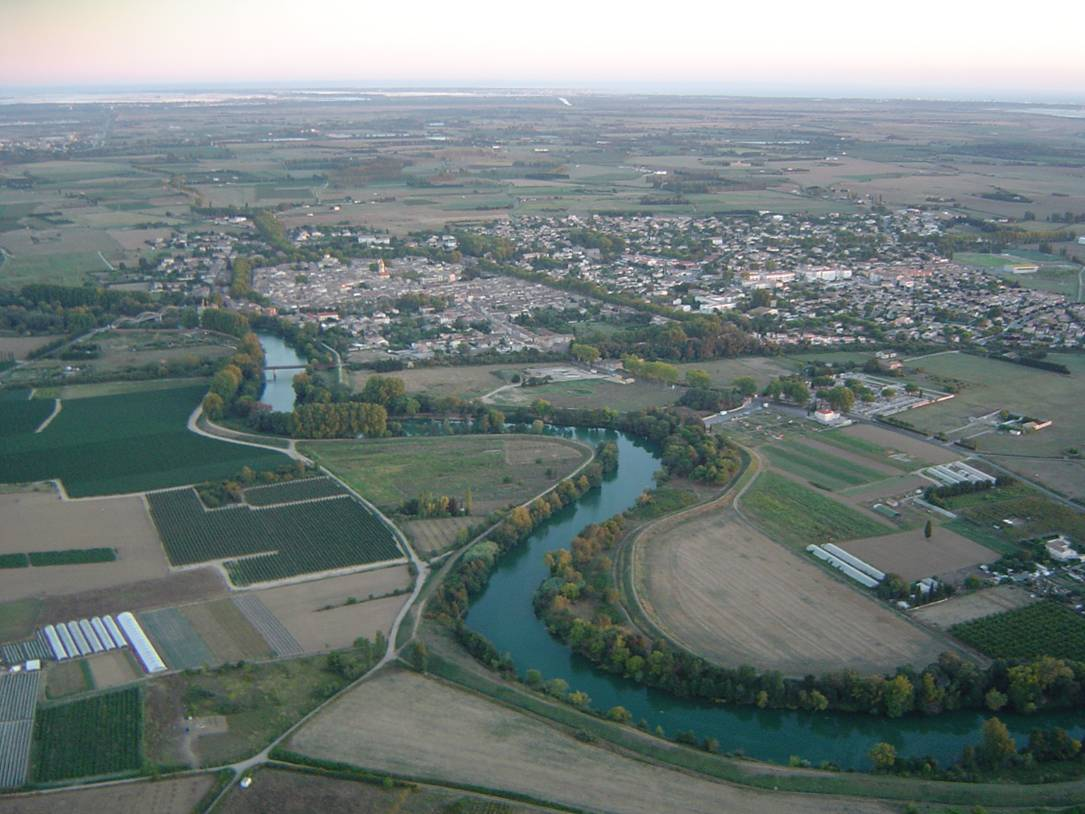
- An aerial view of Marsillargues

- Coat of arms
- Location of Marsillargues
- Location within France Location within Occitanie
- Coordinates: 43°39′54″N 4°10′44″E
- Country: France
- Region: Occitania
- Department: Hérault
- Arrondissement: Montpellier
- Canton: Lunel
- Intercommunality: CA Lunel Agglo

Government
  - Mayor (2020–2026): Patrice Spéziale
- Area^{1}: 42.7 km^{2} (16.5 sq mi)
- Highest elevation: 11 m (36 ft)
- Lowest elevation: 0 m (0 ft)
- Population (2023): 6,988
  - Density: 164/km^{2} (424/sq mi)
- Time zone: UTC+01:00 (CET)
  - Summer (DST): UTC+02:00 (CEST)
- INSEE/Postal code: 34151 /34590
- ^{1} French Land Register data, which excludes lakes, ponds, glaciers > 1 km^{2} (0.386 sq mi or 247 acres) and river estuaries.

Marsillargues (French pronunciation: [maʁsijaʁɡ]; Provençal: Marsilhargues) is a commune in the Hérault department in southern France.

Its inhabitants are called Marsillarguois.

== Geography ==
The city is situated on the Vidourle river, at mid distance of Montpellier and Nîmes. The commune lies on a vast plain, quite marshy in the south part, which is called Petite Camargue. The closest towns to Marsillargues are Lunel, Aimargues and Saint-Laurent-d'Aigouze.

=== Climate ===
Marsillargues has a mediterranean climate (Köppen climate classification Csa). The average annual temperature in Marsillargues is 14.8 °C (58.6 °F). The average annual rainfall is 621.7 mm (24.48 in) with October as the wettest month. The temperatures are highest on average in July, at around 23.6 °C (74.5 °F), and lowest in January, at around 6.9 °C (44.4 °F). The highest temperature ever recorded in Marsillargues was 45.1 °C (113.2 °F) on 28 June 2019; the coldest temperature ever recorded was −9.8 °C (14.4 °F) on 5 February 2012.

Climate data for Marsillargues (1981–2010 averages, extremes 1988−present)
Month	Jan	Feb	Mar	Apr	May	Jun	Jul	Aug	Sep	Oct	Nov	Dec	Year
Record high °C (°F)	21.7 (71.1)	24.2 (75.6)	27.4 (81.3)	30.8 (87.4)	35.0 (95.0)	45.1 (113.2)	36.9 (98.4)	39.0 (102.2)	35.6 (96.1)	32.5 (90.5)	26.1 (79.0)	20.4 (68.7)	45.1 (113.2)
Mean daily maximum °C (°F)	12.1 (53.8)	13.6 (56.5)	16.9 (62.4)	19.0 (66.2)	23.5 (74.3)	27.6 (81.7)	30.5 (86.9)	30.4 (86.7)	25.6 (78.1)	21.0 (69.8)	15.5 (59.9)	12.1 (53.8)	20.7 (69.3)
Daily mean °C (°F)	6.9 (44.4)	8.0 (46.4)	10.8 (51.4)	13.0 (55.4)	17.3 (63.1)	20.9 (69.6)	23.6 (74.5)	23.6 (74.5)	19.4 (66.9)	15.8 (60.4)	10.4 (50.7)	7.3 (45.1)	14.8 (58.6)
Mean daily minimum °C (°F)	1.8 (35.2)	2.3 (36.1)	4.8 (40.6)	7.1 (44.8)	11.2 (52.2)	14.3 (57.7)	16.7 (62.1)	16.8 (62.2)	13.1 (55.6)	10.5 (50.9)	5.3 (41.5)	2.5 (36.5)	8.9 (48.0)
Record low °C (°F)	−8.2 (17.2)	−9.8 (14.4)	−9.4 (15.1)	−2.6 (27.3)	2.8 (37.0)	4.3 (39.7)	8.1 (46.6)	8.3 (46.9)	3.0 (37.4)	−2.2 (28.0)	−7.9 (17.8)	−9.5 (14.9)	−9.8 (14.4)
Average precipitation mm (inches)	55.7 (2.19)	36.6 (1.44)	30.6 (1.20)	62.1 (2.44)	41.6 (1.64)	26.2 (1.03)	15.8 (0.62)	34.3 (1.35)	94.4 (3.72)	102.8 (4.05)	65.2 (2.57)	56.4 (2.22)	621.7 (24.48)
Average precipitation days (≥ 1.0 mm)	5.8	4.1	4.1	6.5	4.9	3.2	2.2	3.5	5.4	7.7	6.8	5.7	60.0
Source: Meteociel

== Population ==
Historical population

Year	Pop.	±% p.a.
1793	2,916	—
1800	2,777	−0.70%
1806	2,905	+0.75%
1821	3,078	+0.39%
1831	3,292	+0.67%
1836	3,382	+0.54%
1841	3,529	+0.85%
1846	3,522	−0.04%
1851	3,549	+0.15%
1856	3,435	−0.65%
1861	3,446	+0.06%
1866	3,609	+0.93%
1872	3,466	−0.67%
1876	3,368	−0.71%
1881	3,227	−0.85%
1886	3,195	−0.20%
1891	3,413	+1.33%
1896	3,507	+0.54%
1901	3,684	+0.99%

Year	Pop.	±% p.a.
1906	3,421	−1.47%
1911	3,242	−1.07%
1921	3,395	+0.46%
1926	3,182	−1.29%
1931	3,334	+0.94%
1936	3,002	−2.08%
1946	2,693	−1.08%
1954	2,755	+0.28%
1962	2,812	+0.26%
1968	3,048	+1.35%
1975	3,023	−0.12%
1982	3,653	+2.74%
1990	4,386	+2.31%
1999	5,334	+2.20%
2007	5,821	+1.10%
2012	6,172	+1.18%
2017	6,248	+0.25%
2023	6,988	+1.88%

Source: EHESS and INSEE (1968-2023)

== Sights ==
=== Guillaume de Nogaret's Castle ===
The castle was founded in 1305 by Guillaume de Nogaret, who became Lord of Marsillargues, in reward of his services returned to Philip IV, King of France. From the feudal castle, only the basements, the large kitchens and the keep with its square tower remain.

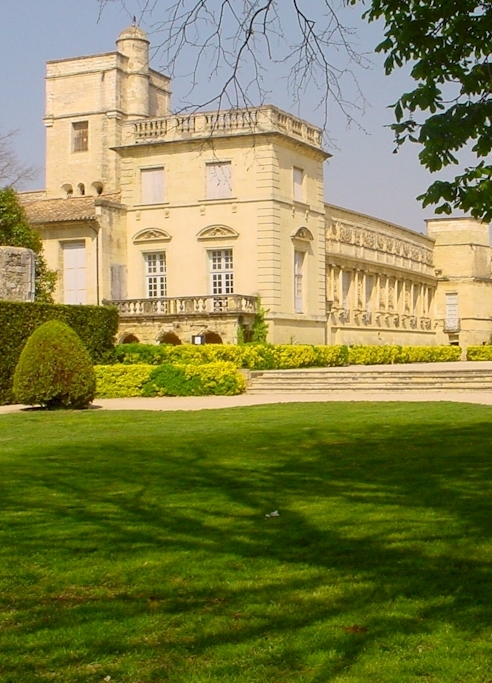
Guillaume de Nogaret's Castle

=== Saint-Sauveur Church ===
The church was built in 1688 by Jacques Cubissol, and houses a remarkable oil painting on canvas "La Nativité" attributed to French painter Charles Errard.

=== Protestant Temple ===
A Temple was first built between 1574 and 1582. During the tragic period of the French Wars of Religion, it was damaged and then repaired in 1599, only to be totally destroyed in 1685 following the revocation of the Edict of Nantes. The Concordat of 1801 allowed a Protestant minister to be installed at Marsillargues in 1803. Ground was broken for a new Temple in 1806, and it was finished in 1818.

== Personalities ==
- Jacques Antoine Mourgue, French Interior Minister in 1792, was born in Marsillargues in 1734.
- Paulin Etienne d'Anglas de Praviel, was born in Marsillargues in 1793: The French lieutenant known as the last marooned man of the shipwreck of the French frigate "Medusa".
- Apollon, born Louis Uni (1862–1928) was a French strongman native from Marsillargues.
- Gaston Defferre (1910–1986), French Interior Minister (1981–1984), and Mayor of Marseille (1944–1945, 1953–1986) was born in Marsillargues in 1910.

== See also ==
- Communes of the Hérault department
