= Canton of Montpellier-5 =

Coordinates: 43.61°N 3.87°E

Montpellier-5
- Canton
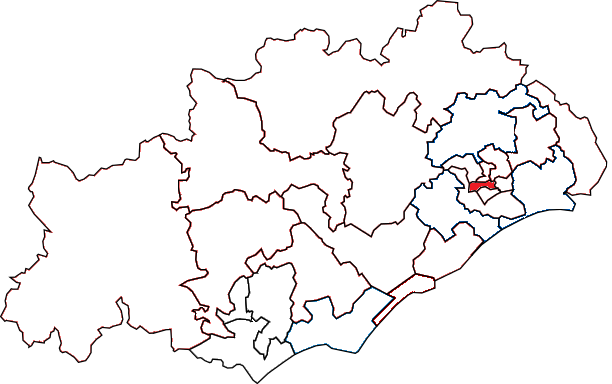
- Interactive map of Montpellier-5
- Country: France
- Region: Occitania
- Department: Hérault
- No. of communes: {{{nbcomm}}}

Government
  - Representatives (2021–2028): Zita Chelvi-Sandin; Sébastien Cristol
- Population (2023): 54,495
- INSEE code: 34 19

The canton of Montpellier-5 is an administrative division of the Hérault department, southern France. Its borders were modified at the French canton reorganisation which came into effect in March 2015. Its seat is in Montpellier.

== Composition ==
It consists of the following communes:

1. Montpellier (partly)

== Councillors ==
Election	Councillors	Party	Occupation
2015	Maud Bodkin	DVG	Councillor of Montpellier
2015	Jérémie Malek	DVG	Councillor of Montpellier
2021	Zita Chelvi-Sandin	PS	DJ
2021	Philippe Vidal	EELV	Spa director
