= Canton of Montpellier-1 =

Coordinates: 43.62°N 3.84°E

Montpellier-1
- Canton
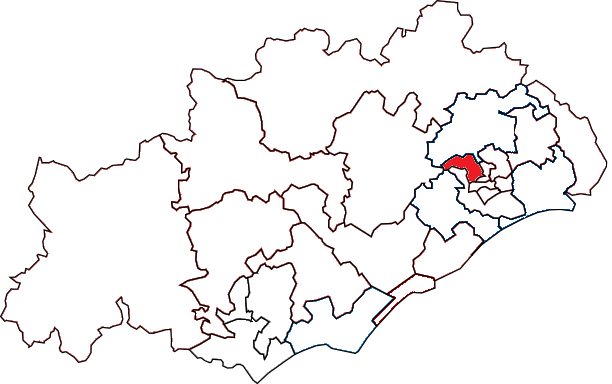
- Interactive map of Montpellier-1
- Country: France
- Region: Occitania
- Department: Hérault
- No. of communes: {{{nbcomm}}}

Government
  - Representatives (2021–2028): Manar Bouida; Rachid El Moudden
- Population (2023): 55,396
- INSEE code: 34 15

The canton of Montpellier-1 is an administrative division of the Hérault department, southern France. Its borders were modified at the French canton reorganisation which came into effect in March 2015. Its seat is in Montpellier.

== Composition ==
It consists of the following communes:

1. Grabels
2. Montpellier (partly)

== Councillors ==
Election	Councillors	Party	Occupation
2015	Abdi El Kandoussi	DVG	Councillor of Montpellier
2015	Chantal Lévy-Rameau	DVG	Dermatologist
2021	Manar Bouida	PS	Administrative assistant of the public service
2021	Rachid El Moudden	EELV	Territorial official

== Pictures of the canton ==
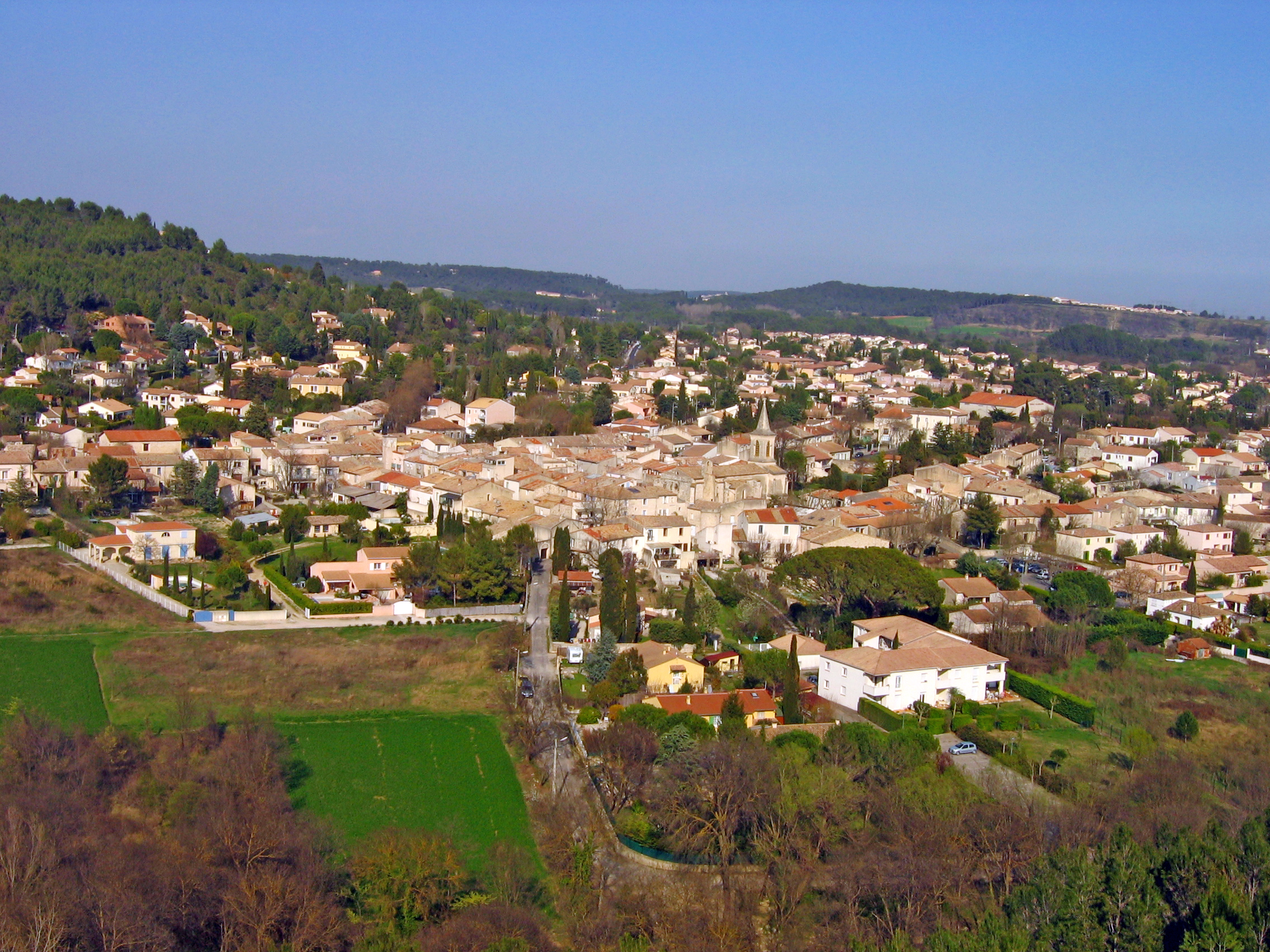
View of Grabels

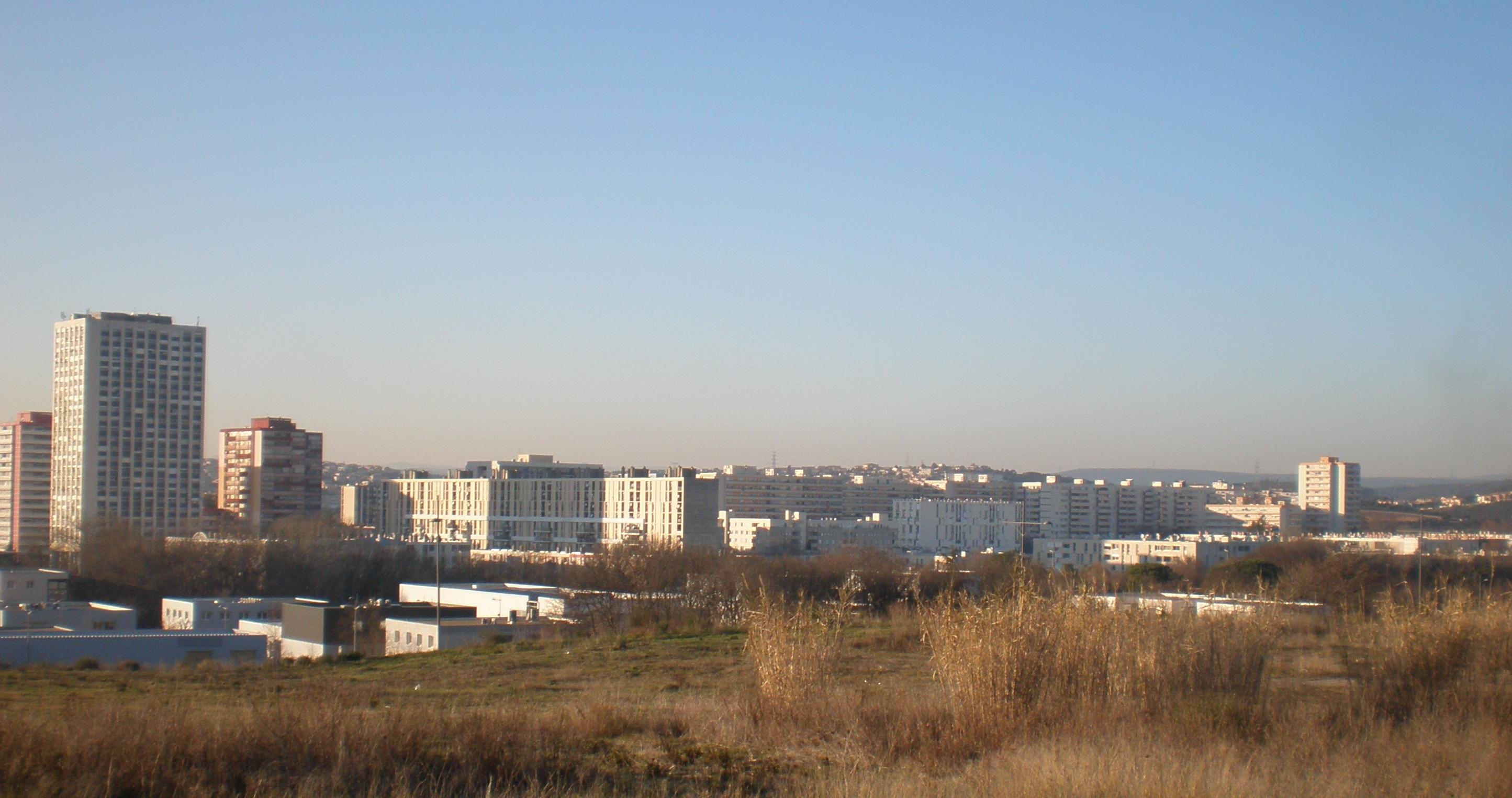
Mosson district in Montpellier
