= Canton of Montpellier-3 =

Coordinates: 43.61°N 3.88°E

Montpellier-3
- Canton
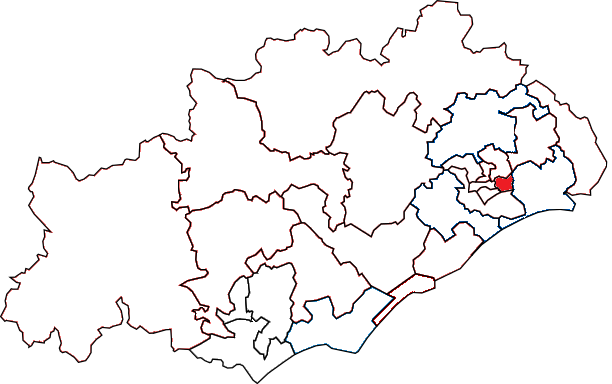
- Interactive map of Montpellier-3
- Country: France
- Region: Occitania
- Department: Hérault
- No. of communes: {{{nbcomm}}}

Government
  - Representatives (2021–2028): Serge Guidez; Karine Wisniewski
- Population (2023): 55,198
- INSEE code: 34 17

The canton of Montpellier-3 is an administrative division of the Hérault department, southern France. Its borders were modified at the French canton reorganisation which came into effect in March 2015. Its seat is in Montpellier.

== Composition ==
It consists of the following communes:

1. Montpellier (partly)

== Councillors ==
Election	Councillors	Party	Occupation
2015	Michèle Dray-Fitoussi	DVG	Councillor of Montpellier
2015	Sauveur Tortorici	DVG	Councillor of Montpellier
2021	Serge Guidez	PS	Former President of the Montpellier Rugby Club Association
2021	Karine Wisniewski	PS	Team manager
