= Canton of Lunel =

Coordinates: 43.67°N 4.13°E

Lunel
- Canton
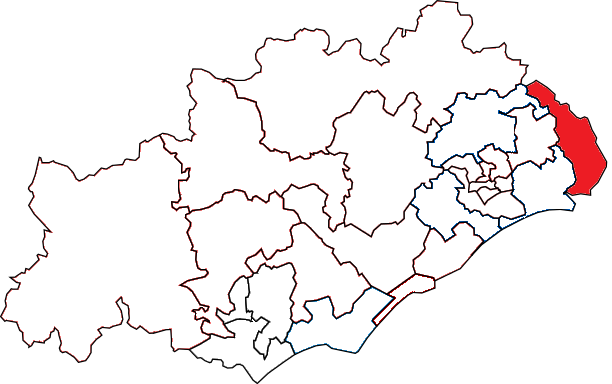
- Interactive map of Lunel
- Country: France
- Region: Occitania
- Department: Hérault
- No. of communes: {{{nbcomm}}}

Government
  - Representatives (2021–2028): Paulette Gougeon; Jérôme Boisson
- Area: 157.91 km^{2} (60.97 sq mi)
- Population (2023): 52,490
  - Density: 332.4/km^{2} (860.9/sq mi)
- INSEE code: 34 12

The canton of Lunel is an administrative division of the Hérault department, southern France. Its borders were modified at the French canton reorganisation which came into effect in March 2015. Its seat is in Lunel.

== Composition ==
It consists of the following communes:

1. Boisseron
2. Campagne
3. Entre-Vignes
4. Galargues
5. Garrigues
6. Lunel
7. Lunel-Viel
8. Marsillargues
9. Saint-Just
10. Saint-Nazaire-de-Pézan
11. Saint-Sériès
12. Saturargues
13. Saussines
14. Villetelle

== Councillors ==
Election	Councillors	Party	Occupation
2015	Claude Barral	PS	Former Mayor of Lunel
2015	Bernadette Vignon	DVG	Mayor of Marsillargues

== Pictures of the canton ==
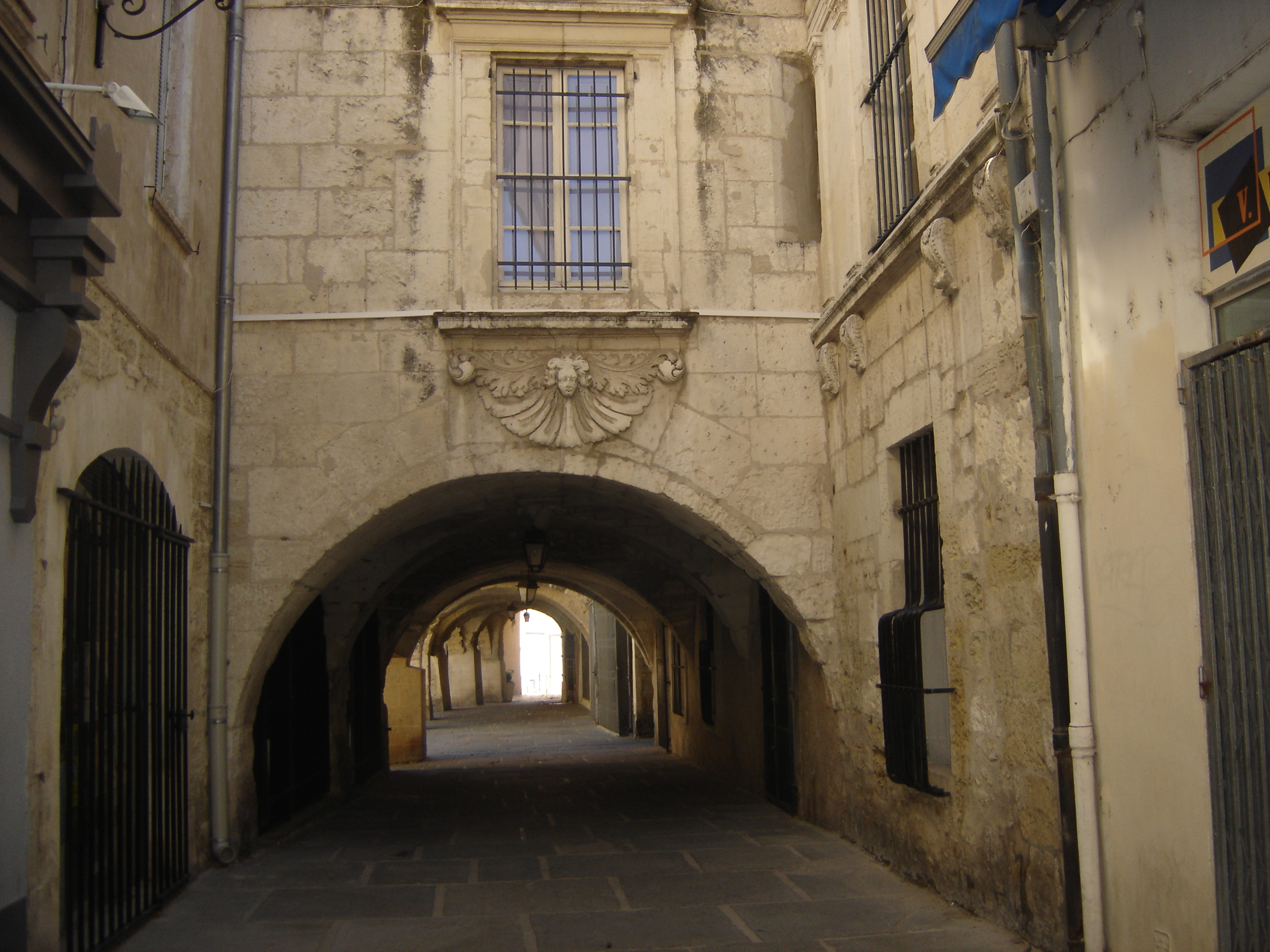
Mediaeval arcades in Lunel

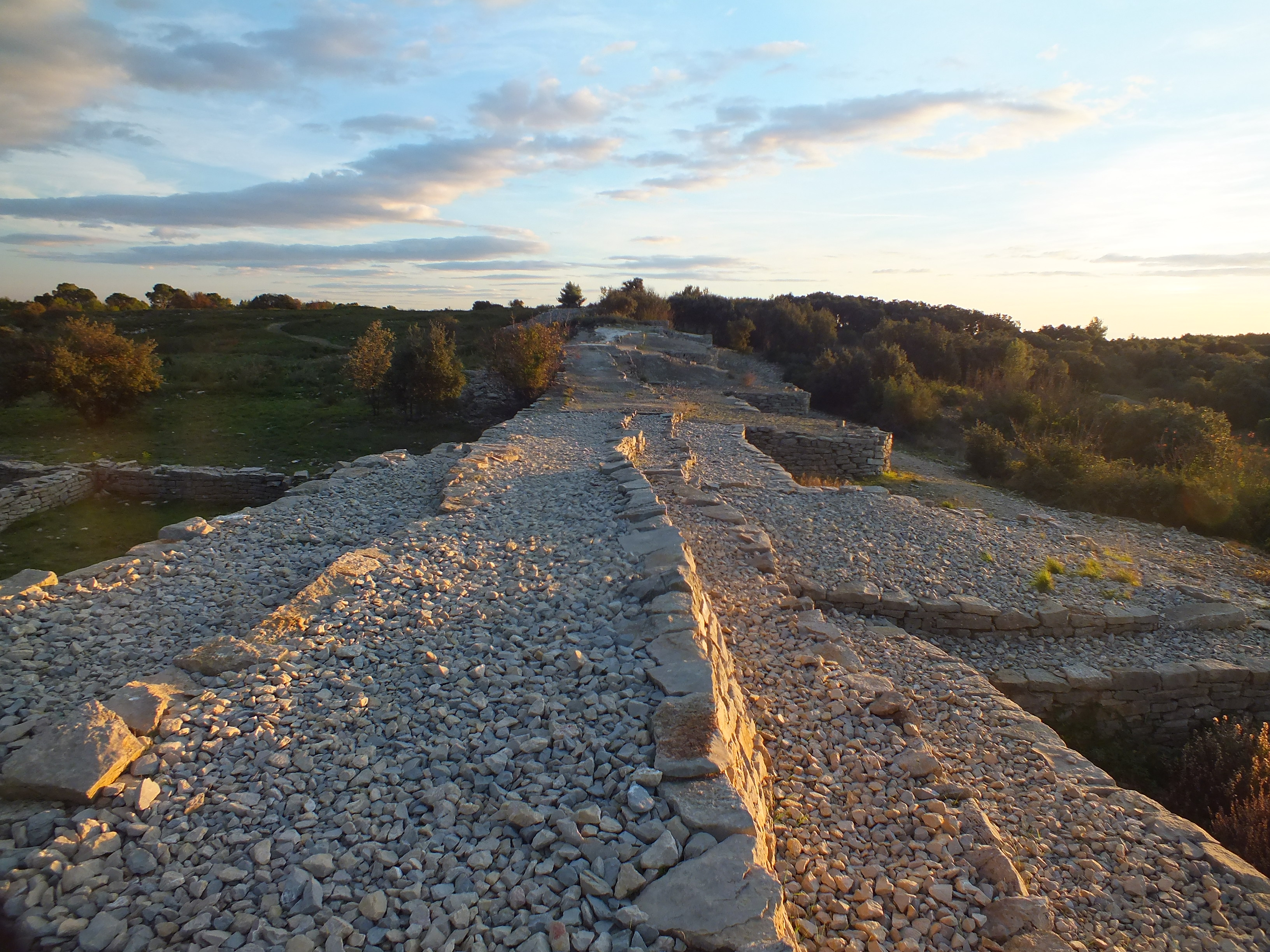
Ambrussum

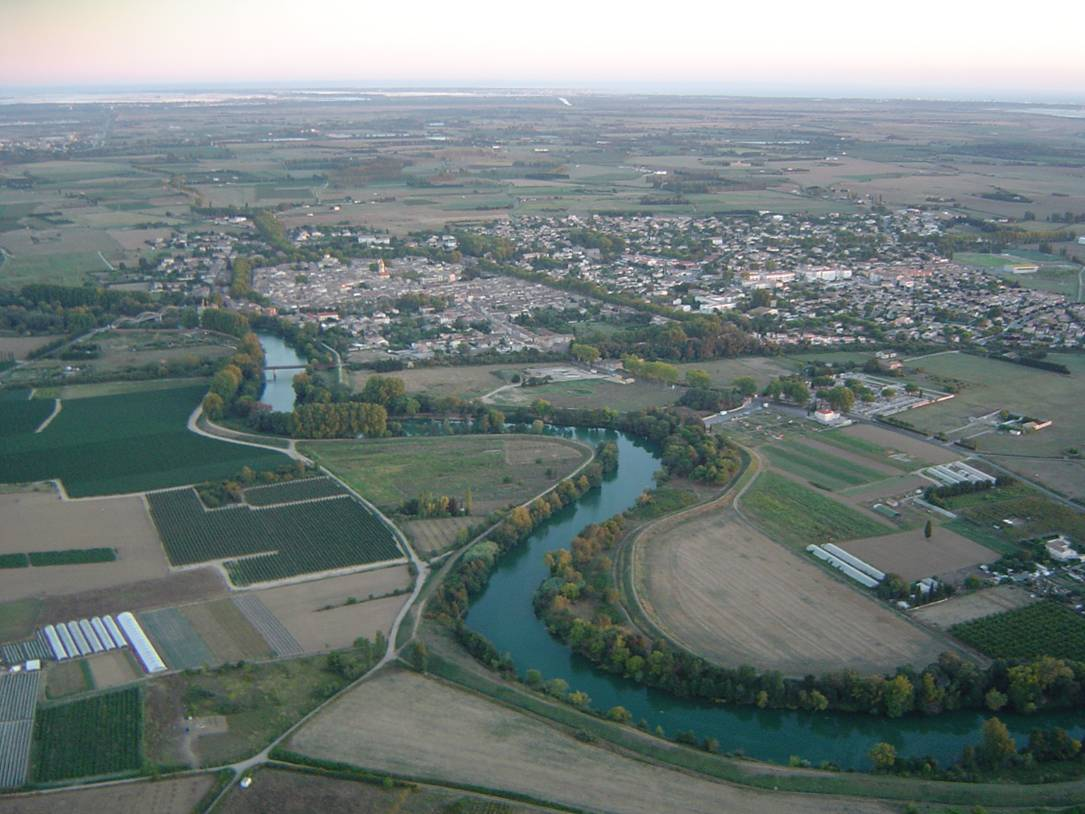
View of Marsillargues
