= 2015 French departmental elections =

To elect the membership of the Departmental Councils of France's departments

Party affiliation of the Departmental Council Presidents after the elections

Departmental elections to elect the membership of the departmental councils of France's 100 departments were held on 22 and 29 March 2015 (first and second round). In 2015 for the first time, the term "departmental elections" (French: élections départementales) replaced "cantonal elections" (élections cantonales); as did the term "Departmental Council" (conseil départemental), replacing "General Council" (conseil général).

The right-wing Union for a Popular Movement (UMP) won 27 new departments and lost one, resulting in it holding a majority in 67 departmental councils. 62 candidates were elected for the National Front (FN) nationwide although the party won no departments.

== Electoral system ==
Like the previous cantonal elections, the departmental elections used a two-round system similar to that employed in the country's legislative elections. One change was that the election adopted paired voting known as binomial voting.

- 2 councillors (a man and a woman) were elected from the reconfigured cantons adopted in 2014.
- A pair securing the votes of at least 25% of the canton's registered voters and more than 50% of the total number of votes actually cast in the first round of voting would be thereby elected. If no candidate satisfies these conditions, then a second round of voting would be held one week later.
- The two pairs who received the highest number of votes in the first round, plus any other pair of candidates who received the votes of at least 12.5% of those registered to vote in the canton, would be eligible to stand in the second round.
- In the second round, the pair receiving the highest number of votes would be elected.

Neither the city of Paris, the Lyon Metropolis, nor Martinique and French Guiana took part in this election due to their particular statuses.

== Results ==
Leading single party or grouping after the first round in Metropolitan France, broken down by department. Colour key: National Front Union for a Popular Movement Union of the Right Miscellaneous right Socialist Party Union of the Left Miscellaneous left No election

Party	First round			Second round			Total seats
Party	Votes	%	Seats	Votes	%	Seats	Total seats
Left Front (Front de Gauche)	962,394	4.72	1	266,896	1.44	7	19
Union of the Left (Union de la Gauche) [Socialist Party and its allies]	1,667,533	8,19	-	1,679,890	9,09	-	-
Socialist Party (Parti socialiste)	2,708,427	13.30	24	2,967,883	16.06	925	954
Europe Écologie – Les Verts	412,729	2.03	0	29,888	0.16	35	35
Communist Party (Parti communiste français)	269,285	1.32	5	100,413	0.54	167	121
Miscellaneous left (Divers gauche)	1,383,318	6.79	27	828,537	4.48	376	403
Radical Party of the Left (Parti radical de gauche)	62,372	0.31	4	64 110	0.35	59	63
Left Party (Parti de gauche)	12,027	0.06	0	2,498	0.01	2	2
Union for a Popular Movement (Union pour un Mouvement Populaire)	1,339,412	6.57	74	1,596,391	8.64	1006	1080
Miscellaneous right (Divers droite)	1,386,466	6.81	115	1,279,623	6.92	784	899
Union of Democrats and Independents (Union des Démocrates Indépendants)	263,209	1.29	30	247,714	1.34	334	364
Union of the Right (Union de la Droite) [Union pour un Mouvement Populaire and its allies]	4,254,050	20.88	-	5,102,317	27.61	-	-
National Front (Front national)	5,141,897	25.24	8	4,108,404	22.23	54	62
Others (Divers)	271,065	1.33	4	98,781	0.53	45	49
Democratic Movement (Mouvement démocrate)	72,410	0.36	1	48,038	0.26	47	48
Far-right (Extrême droite)	13,382	0.07	0	12,851	0.07	4	4
Totals	21,419,393	50.17	528	20,160,862	49.98		
Turnout							
