= Saint-Jean-de-Védas =

- Commune
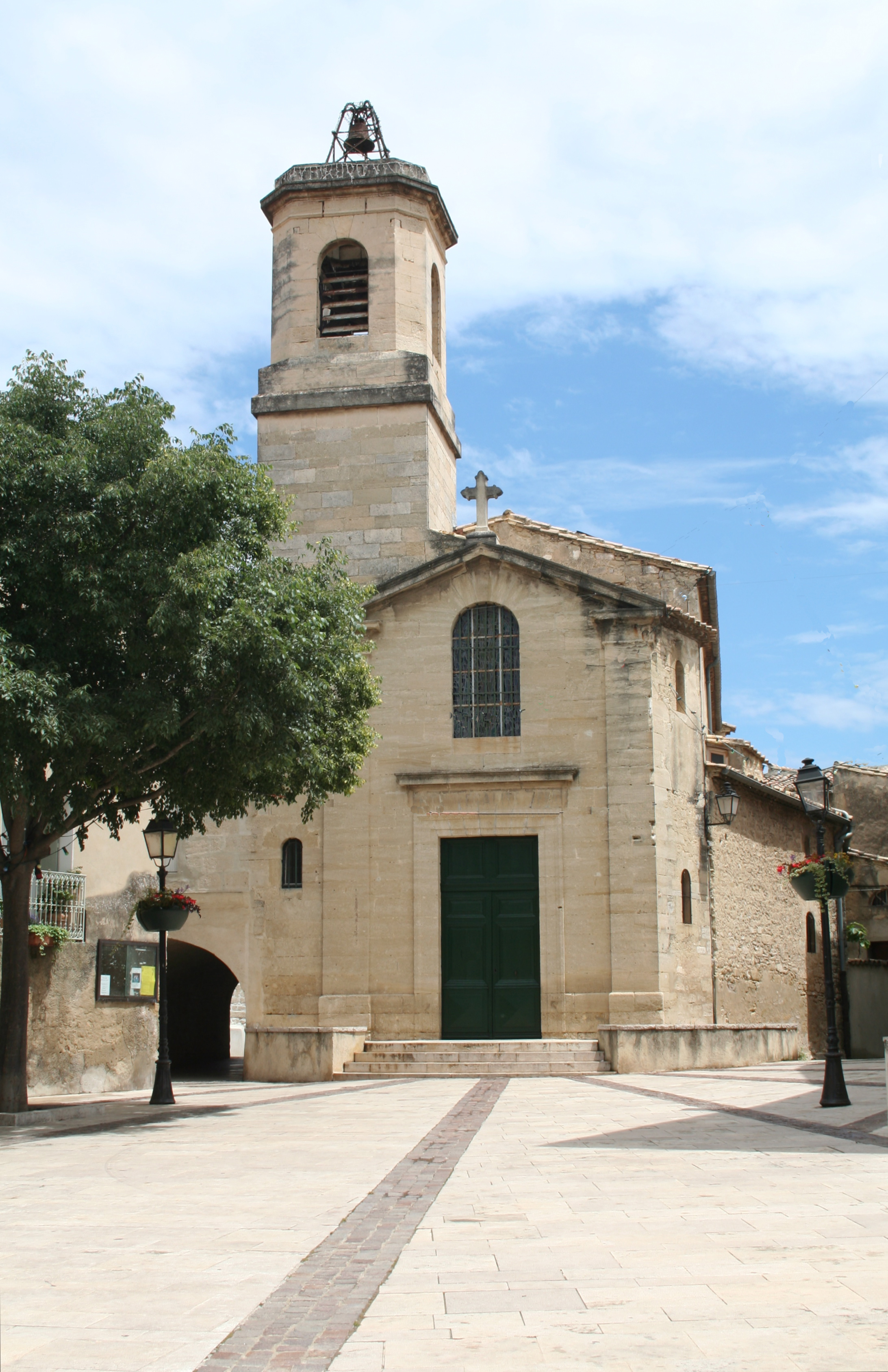
- The church of Saint-Jean-de-Védas

- Coat of arms
- Location of Saint-Jean-de-Védas
- Location within France Location within Occitanie
- Coordinates: 43°34′38″N 3°49′29″E
- Country: France
- Region: Occitania
- Department: Hérault
- Arrondissement: Montpellier
- Canton: Lattes
- Intercommunality: Montpellier Méditerranée Métropole

Government
  - Mayor (2020–2026): François Rio
- Area^{1}: 12.89 km^{2} (4.98 sq mi)
- Elevation: 49 m (161 ft)
- Highest elevation: 65 m (213 ft)
- Lowest elevation: 4 m (13 ft)
- Population (2023): 13,328
  - Density: 1,034/km^{2} (2,678/sq mi)
- Time zone: UTC+01:00 (CET)
  - Summer (DST): UTC+02:00 (CEST)
- INSEE/Postal code: 34270 /34430
- ^{1} French Land Register data, which excludes lakes, ponds, glaciers > 1 km^{2} (0.386 sq mi or 247 acres) and river estuaries.

Saint-Jean-de-Védas (French pronunciation: [sɛ̃ ʒɑ̃ də vedas]; Languedocien: Sant Joan de Vedats) is a commune in the Hérault department in the Occitanie region in southern France.

== Geography ==
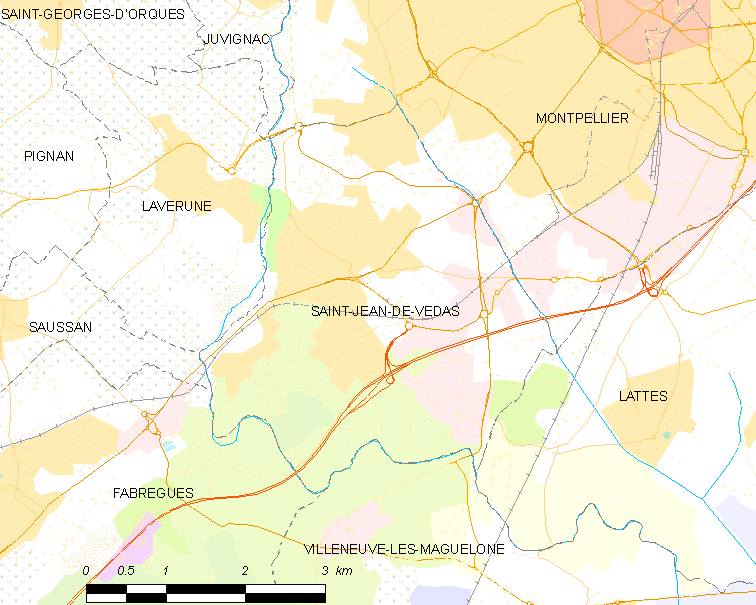
Map

Located southwest of Montpellier, the commune is composed of a series of increasingly steep hills towards the southwest and the Gardiole massif. It is traversed by the Rieucoulon River along its boundary with Montpellier and by the Mosson River to the west and south.

The commune borders Montpellier to the north and east, Juvignac and Lavérune to the northwest, Fabrègues to the southwest, and Villeneuve-lès-Maguelone to the southeast, and Lattes to the east.

=== Climate ===
In 2010, the climate of the commune is classified as a frank Mediterranean climate, according to a study based on a dataset covering the 1971-2000 period. In 2020, Météo-France published a typology of climates in mainland France in which the commune is exposed to a Mediterranean climate and is part of the Provence, Languedoc-Roussillon climatic region, characterized by low rainfall in summer, very good sunshine (2,600 h/year), a hot summer 21.5 °C (71 °F), very dry air in summer, dry conditions in all seasons, strong winds (with a frequency of 40 to 50% for winds > 5 m/s), and little fog.

For the 1971-2000 period, the average annual temperature was 14.4 °C (58 °F) with an annual atmospheric temperature of 16.3 °C (61 °F). The average annual total rainfall during this period was 657 mm, with 5.8 days of precipitation in January and 2.7 days in July. For the subsequent period of 1991 to 2020, the average annual temperature observed at the nearest weather station, located in the commune of Saint-André-de-Sangonis, 6 kilometres (4 mi) away as the crow flies, is 15.4 °C (60 °F), and the average annual total rainfall is 591.6 mm.

For the future, climate parameters for the commune projected for 2050, based on different greenhouse gas emission scenarios, can be consulted on a dedicated website published by Météo-France in November 2022.

== Urbanism ==
=== Typology ===
As of 1 January 2024, Saint-Jean-de-Védas is classified as a ‘grand centre urbain’ (major urban center) according to the new seven-level commune density grid established by Insee in 2022. It is part of the Montpellier urban unit, (Note: An urban unit in France is defined as a commune or a group of communes with a continuous built-up area (no gap greater than 200 meters between two buildings) and a population of at least 2,000 inhabitants. A commune must have more than half of its population within this built-up area to qualify as part of an urban unit.) an intra-departmental agglomeration comprising 22 communes, of which Saint-Jean-de-Védas is a suburban commune. (Note: In a multi-communal agglomeration, a commune is classified as suburban when it is not the central city; this means its population is less than 50% of the agglomeration’s total population or that of the most populated commune. In the case of the Montpellier urban unit, there is one central city and 21 suburban communes.) Additionally, Saint-Jean-de-Védas belongs to the Montpellier attraction area, where it is designated as a primary hub city. (Note: The concept of a functional area replaced the former concept of an urban area in October 2020, enabling consistent comparisons with other European Union countries.) This area, encompassing 161 communes, falls under the category of areas with 700,000 inhabitants or more (excluding Paris).

=== Land Use ===
The land use in the commune, as recorded in the European biophysical land use database, Corine Land Cover (CLC), is characterized by a high proportion of artificial areas, accounting for 51.4% in 2018, up from 33.9% in 1990. The detailed distribution in 2018 was as follows: urban areas (30.2%), heterogeneous agricultural areas (26.5%), industrial or commercial zones and communication networks (21.2%), shrub and/or herbaceous vegetation environments (18.5%), grasslands (1.9%), forests (1.3%), and arable land (0.5%). Changes in the commune’s land use and infrastructure can be observed on various cartographic representations of the area: the Cassini map (18th century), the military topographic map (1820–1866), and IGN maps or aerial photographs from 1950 to the present day.

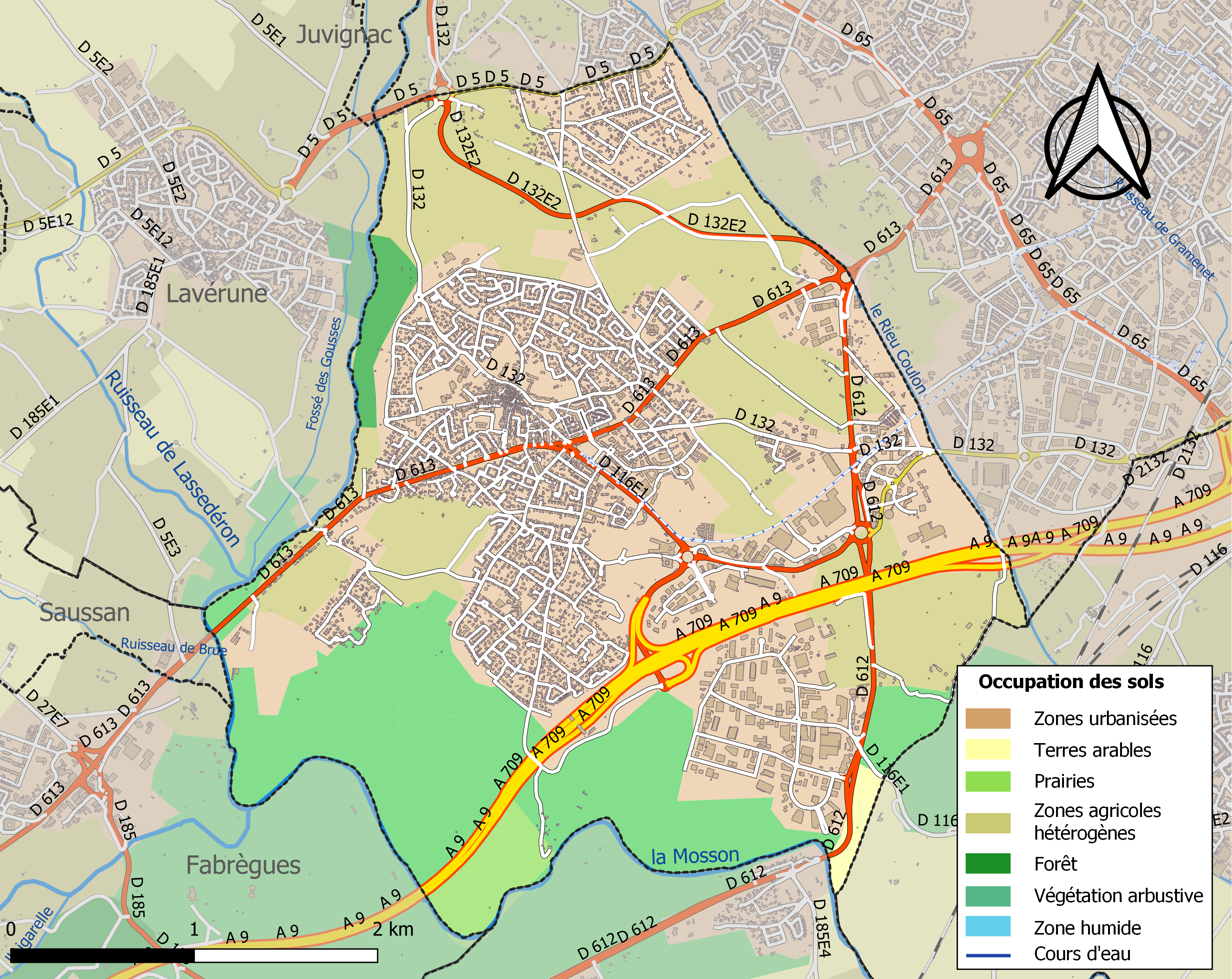
Map of Infrastructure and Land Use in the Commune in 2018 (CLC)

== Population ==
Historical population

Year	Pop.	±% p.a.
1793	441	—
1800	483	+1.31%
1806	497	+0.48%
1821	483	−0.19%
1831	562	+1.53%
1836	593	+1.08%
1841	628	+1.15%
1846	662	+1.06%
1851	703	+1.21%
1856	650	−1.56%
1861	655	+0.15%
1866	746	+2.64%
1872	824	+1.67%
1876	864	+1.19%
1881	674	−4.85%
1886	759	+2.40%
1891	788	+0.75%
1896	883	+2.30%
1901	859	−0.55%

Year	Pop.	±% p.a.
1906	845	−0.33%
1911	858	+0.31%
1921	876	+0.21%
1926	910	+0.76%
1931	936	+0.57%
1936	956	+0.42%
1946	986	+0.31%
1954	1,149	+1.93%
1962	1,772	+5.56%
1968	2,086	+2.76%
1975	3,529	+7.80%
1982	4,284	+2.81%
1990	5,390	+2.91%
1999	8,056	+4.57%
2007	8,653	+0.90%
2012	8,549	−0.24%
2017	10,008	+3.20%
2023	13,328	+4.89%

Source: Ldh/EHESS/Cassini until 1999, and INSEE since 2007.

== See also ==
- Communes of the Hérault department
