= Juvignac =

- Commune
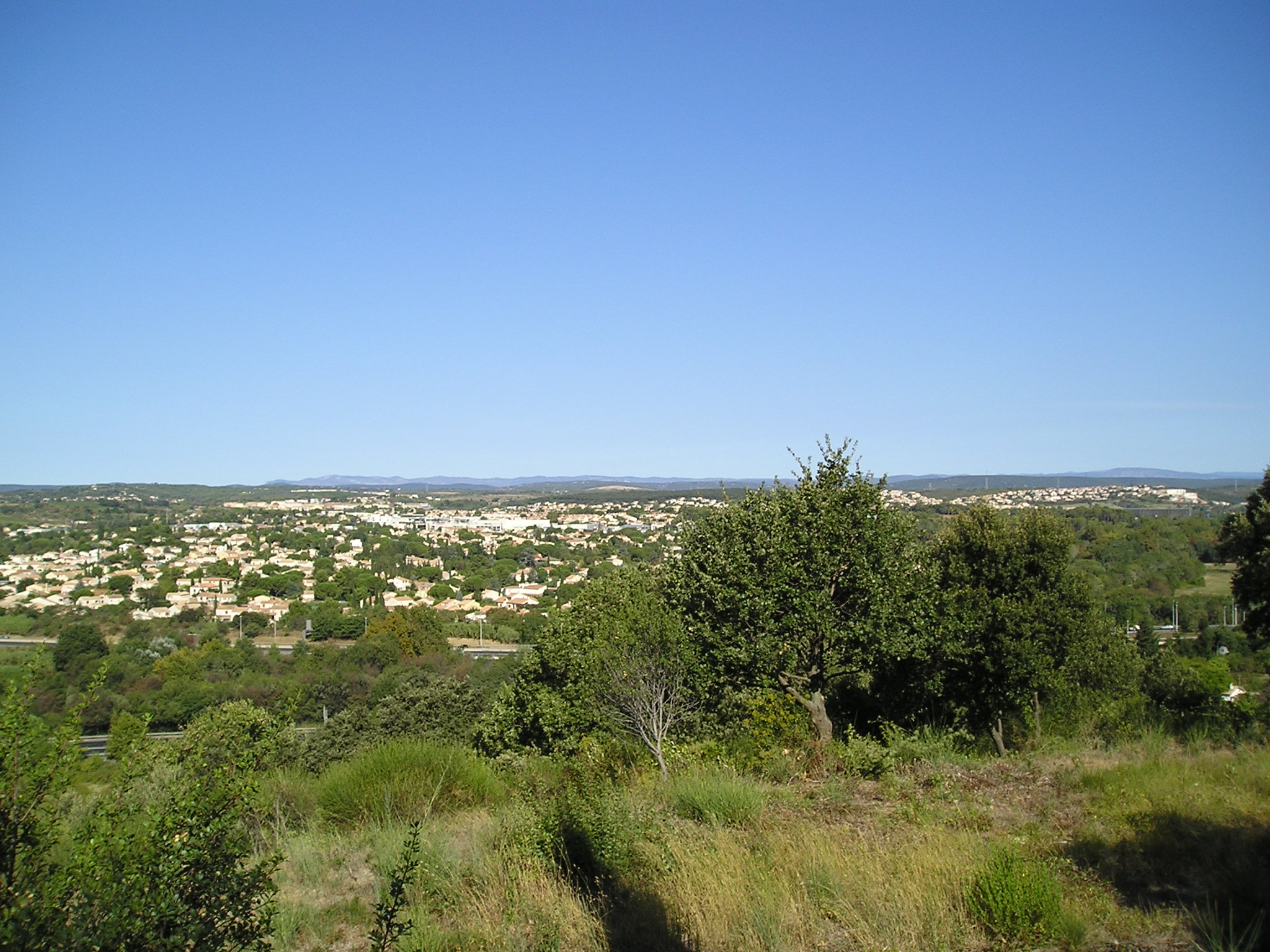
- A general view of Juvignac

- Coat of arms
- Location of Juvignac
- Location within France Location within Occitanie
- Coordinates: 43°36′50″N 3°48′38″E
- Country: France
- Region: Occitania
- Department: Hérault
- Arrondissement: Montpellier
- Canton: Lattes
- Intercommunality: Montpellier Méditerranée Métropole

Government
  - Mayor (2020–2026): Jean-Luc Savy
- Area^{1}: 10.83 km^{2} (4.18 sq mi)
- Highest elevation: 145 m (476 ft)
- Lowest elevation: 22.5 m (74 ft)
- Population (2023): 14,055
  - Density: 1,298/km^{2} (3,361/sq mi)
- Time zone: UTC+01:00 (CET)
  - Summer (DST): UTC+02:00 (CEST)
- INSEE/Postal code: 34123 /34990
- ^{1} French Land Register data, which excludes lakes, ponds, glaciers > 1 km^{2} (0.386 sq mi or 247 acres) and river estuaries.

Juvignac (French pronunciation: [ʒyviɲak]; Occitan: Juvinhac) is a commune in the Hérault département in the Occitanie region in southern France.

== Geography ==
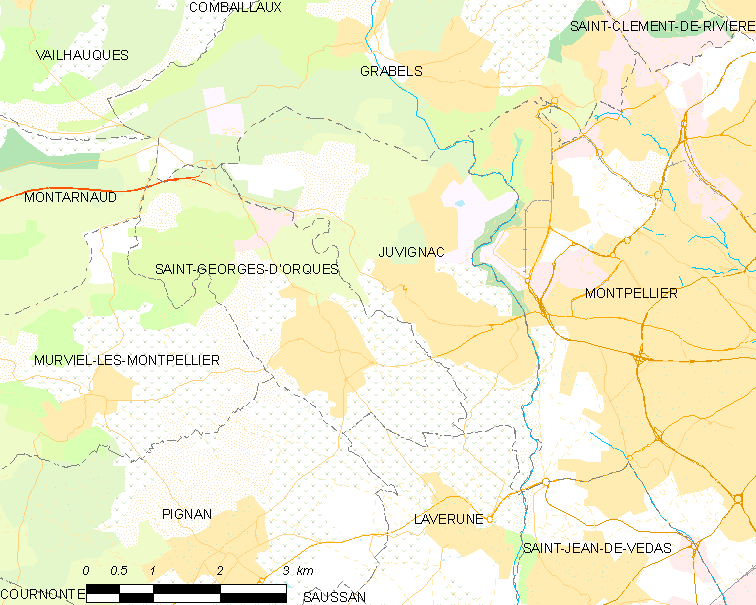
Map

The commune borders Montpellier to the east (separated by the Mosson River), Lavérune and Saint-Jean-de-Védas to the south (meeting at a quadripoint), Saint-Georges-d'Orques to the west, and Grabels to the north. Juvignac is the most populous commune in the western arc of Montpellier. It has a Mediterranean climate, with over three hundred days of sunshine annually.

=== Climate ===
In 2010, the climate of the commune was classified as a frank Mediterranean climate, according to a study based on a dataset covering the 1971-2000 period. In 2020, Météo-France published a typology of climates in mainland France in which the commune is exposed to a Mediterranean climate and is part of the Provence, Languedoc-Roussillon climatic region, characterized by low rainfall in summer, very good sunshine (2,600 h/year), a hot summer 21.5 °C (71 °F), very dry air in summer, dry conditions in all seasons, strong winds (with a frequency of 40 to 50% for winds > 5 m/s), and little fog.

From 1971-2000, the average annual temperature was 14.4 °C (58 °F) with an annual atmospheric temperature of 16.5 °C (62 °F). The average annual total rainfall during this period was 695 mm, with 6 days of precipitation in January and 2.8 days in July. For the subsequent period of 1991 to 2020, the average annual temperature observed at the nearest weather station, located in the commune of Prades-le-Lez, 10 kilometres (6 mi) away, was 14.6 °C (58 °F), and the average annual total rainfall was 869.7 mm.

Climate parameters for the commune projected for 2050, based on different greenhouse gas emission scenarios, can be consulted on a dedicated website published by Météo-France in November 2022.

=== Natural environments and biodiversity ===
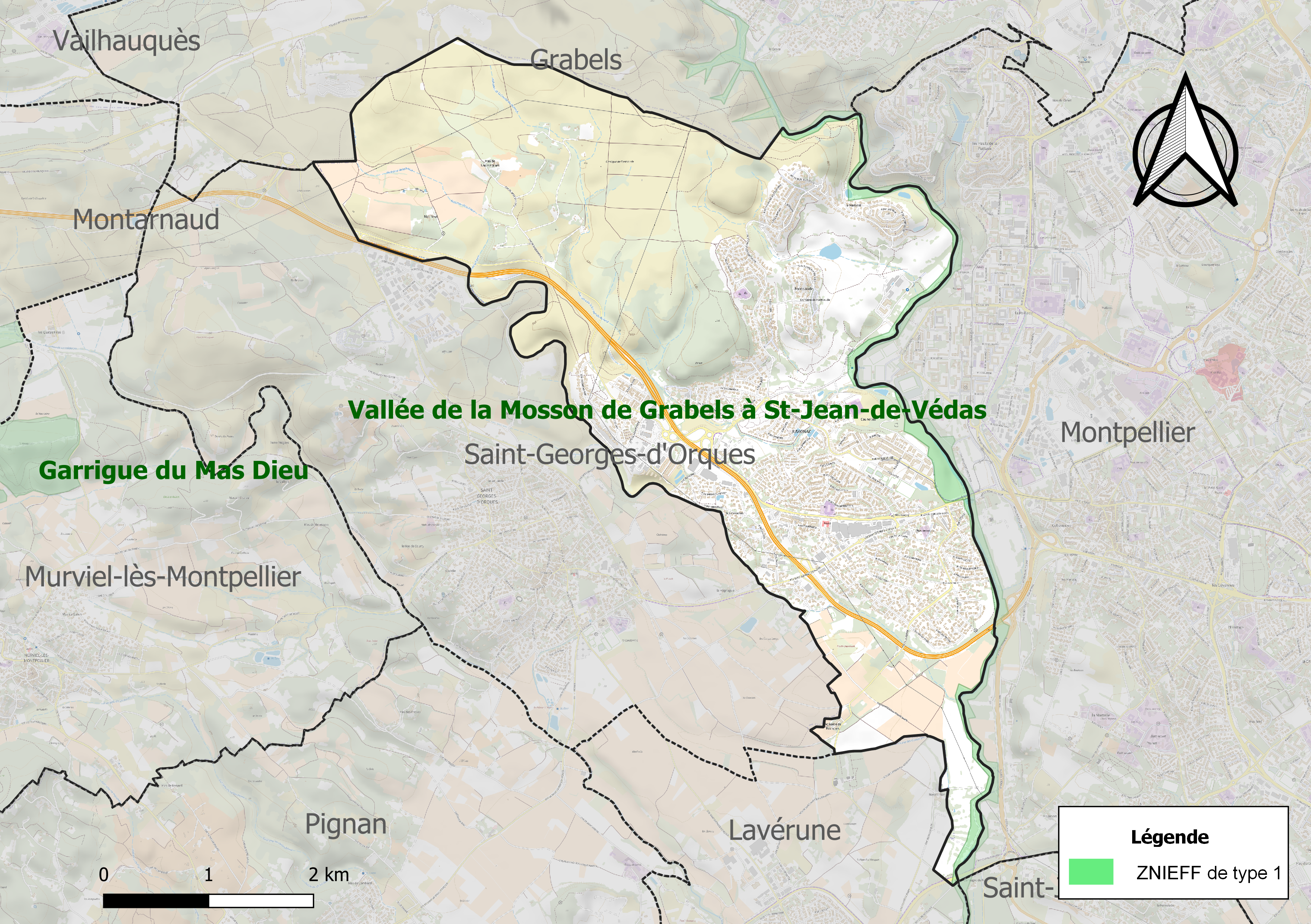
Map of the Type 1 ZNIEFF located within the commune.

The inventory of natural areas of ecological, faunistic, and floristic interest (Zone naturelle d'intérêt écologique, faunistique et floristique, ZNIEFF) is a French national program aimed at identifying ecologically significant areas to enhance knowledge of natural heritage and aid decision-makers in integrating environmental concerns into land-use planning. One type 1 ZNIEFF (Note: Type 1 ZNIEFF are areas generally of limited size, characterized by the presence of rare or remarkable species, species associations, or habitats that are typical of the regional or national natural heritage.) is recorded in the commune: the 'Mosson Valley from Grabels to St-Jean-de-Védas', covering approximately 114 hectares (282 acres) across five communes in the department.

== Urbanism ==
=== Typology ===
As of 1 January 2024, Juvignac is classified as an ‘ceinture urbaine’ (urban belt) according to the new seven-level commune density grid established by Insee in 2022. It is part of the urban unit of Montpellier, (Note: An urban unit in France is defined as a commune or a group of communes with a continuous built-up area (no gap greater than 200 meters between two buildings) and a population of at least 2,000 inhabitants. A commune must have more than half of its population within this built-up area to qualify as part of an urban unit.) an intra-departmental agglomeration comprising 22 communes, of which Juvignac is a suburban commune. (Note: In a multi-communal agglomeration, a commune is classified as suburban when it is not the central city; this means its population is less than 50% of the agglomeration’s total population or that of the most populated commune. In the case of the Montpellier urban unit, there is one central city and 21 suburban communes.) Additionally, Juvignac belongs to the Montpellier attraction area, where it is designated as a commuter town. (Note: The concept of a functional area replaced the former concept of an urban area in October 2020, enabling consistent comparisons with other European Union countries.) This area, encompassing 161 communes, falls under the category of areas with 700,000 inhabitants or more (excluding Paris).

== Population ==
Historical population

Year	Pop.	±% p.a.
1793	105	—
1800	97	−1.13%
1806	103	+1.01%
1821	111	+0.50%
1831	75	−3.84%
1836	89	+3.48%
1841	88	−0.23%
1846	78	−2.38%
1851	89	+2.67%
1856	72	−4.15%
1861	74	+0.55%
1866	86	+3.05%
1872	85	−0.19%
1876	86	+0.29%
1881	76	−2.44%
1886	77	+0.26%
1891	92	+3.62%
1896	76	−3.75%
1901	86	+2.50%

Year	Pop.	±% p.a.
1906	92	+1.36%
1911	111	+3.83%
1921	92	−1.86%
1926	90	−0.44%
1931	115	+5.02%
1936	109	−1.07%
1946	79	−3.17%
1954	89	+1.50%
1962	182	+9.35%
1968	398	+13.93%
1975	2,653	+31.13%
1982	3,488	+3.99%
1990	4,221	+2.41%
1999	5,592	+3.17%
2007	6,354	+1.61%
2012	7,865	+4.36%
2017	11,084	+7.10%
2023	14,055	+4.04%

Source: Ldh/EHESS/Cassini until 1999, and INSEE since 2007.

== See also ==
- Communes of the Hérault department
