= Canton of Lattes =

Coordinates: 43°33′19″N 3°55′50″E

Lattes
- Canton
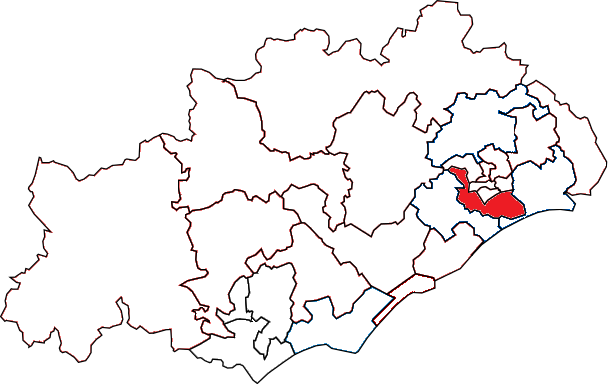
- Interactive map of Lattes
- Country: France
- Region: Occitania
- Department: Hérault
- No. of communes: {{{nbcomm}}}

Government
  - Representatives (2021–2028): Cyril Meunier; Patricia Weber
- Area: 64.74 km^{2} (25.00 sq mi)
- Population (2023): 57,651
  - Density: 890.5/km^{2} (2,306/sq mi)
- INSEE code: 34 10

The canton of Lattes is an administrative division of the Hérault department, southern France. Its borders were modified at the French canton reorganisation which came into effect in March 2015. Its seat is in Lattes.

== Composition ==
It consists of the following communes:

- Juvignac
- Lattes
- Lavérune
- Pérols
- Saint-Jean-de-Védas

== Councillors ==
Election	Councillors	Party	Occupation
2015	Cyril Meunier	PS	Mayor of Lattes; Vice President of Montpellier Méditerranée Métropole
2015	Patricia Weber	PS	Councillor of Juvignac
2021	Cyril Meunier	PS	Mayor of Lattes
2021	Patricia Weber	PS	Councillor of Juvignac

== Pictures of the canton ==
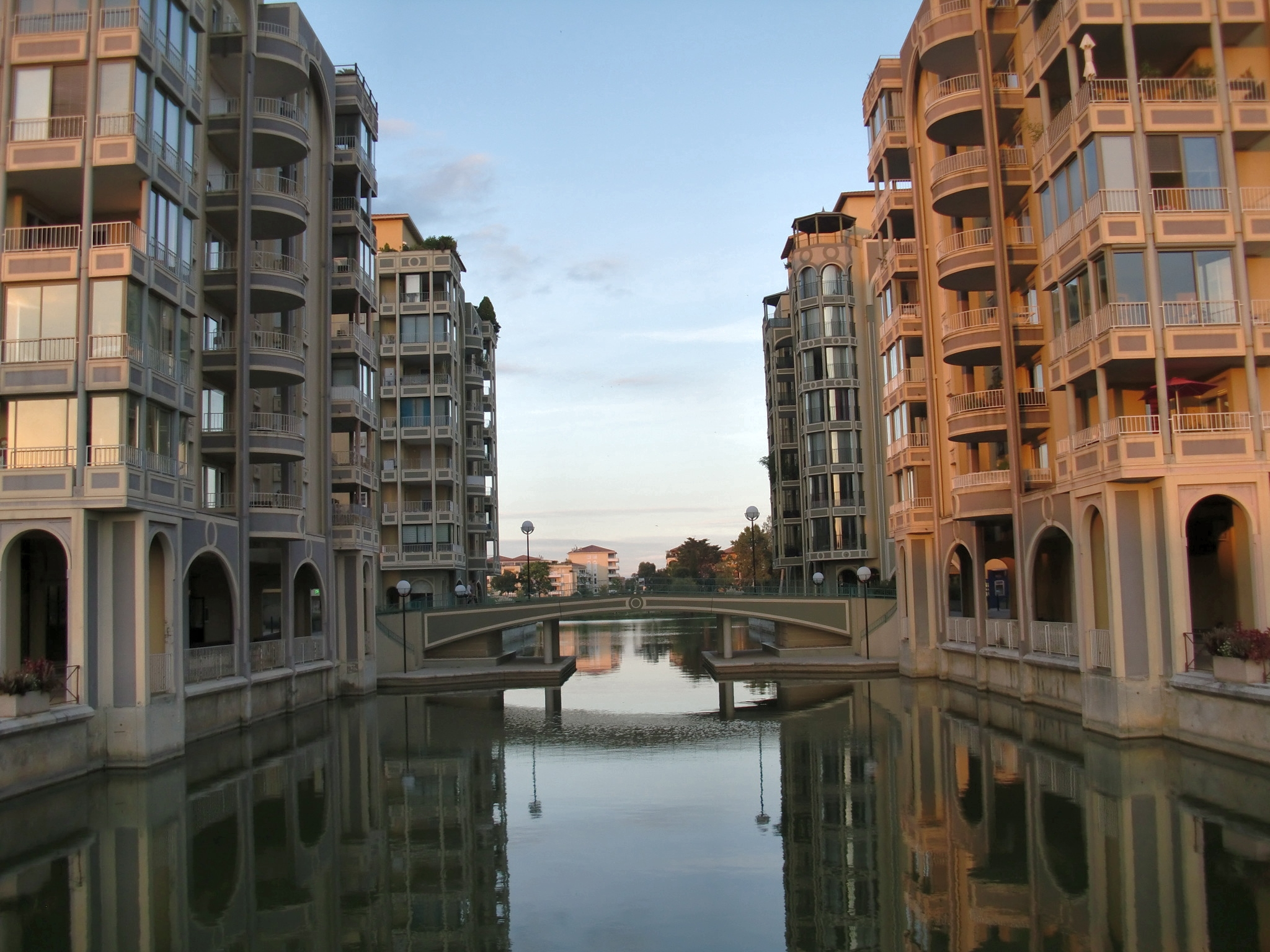
Port Ariane district in Lattes

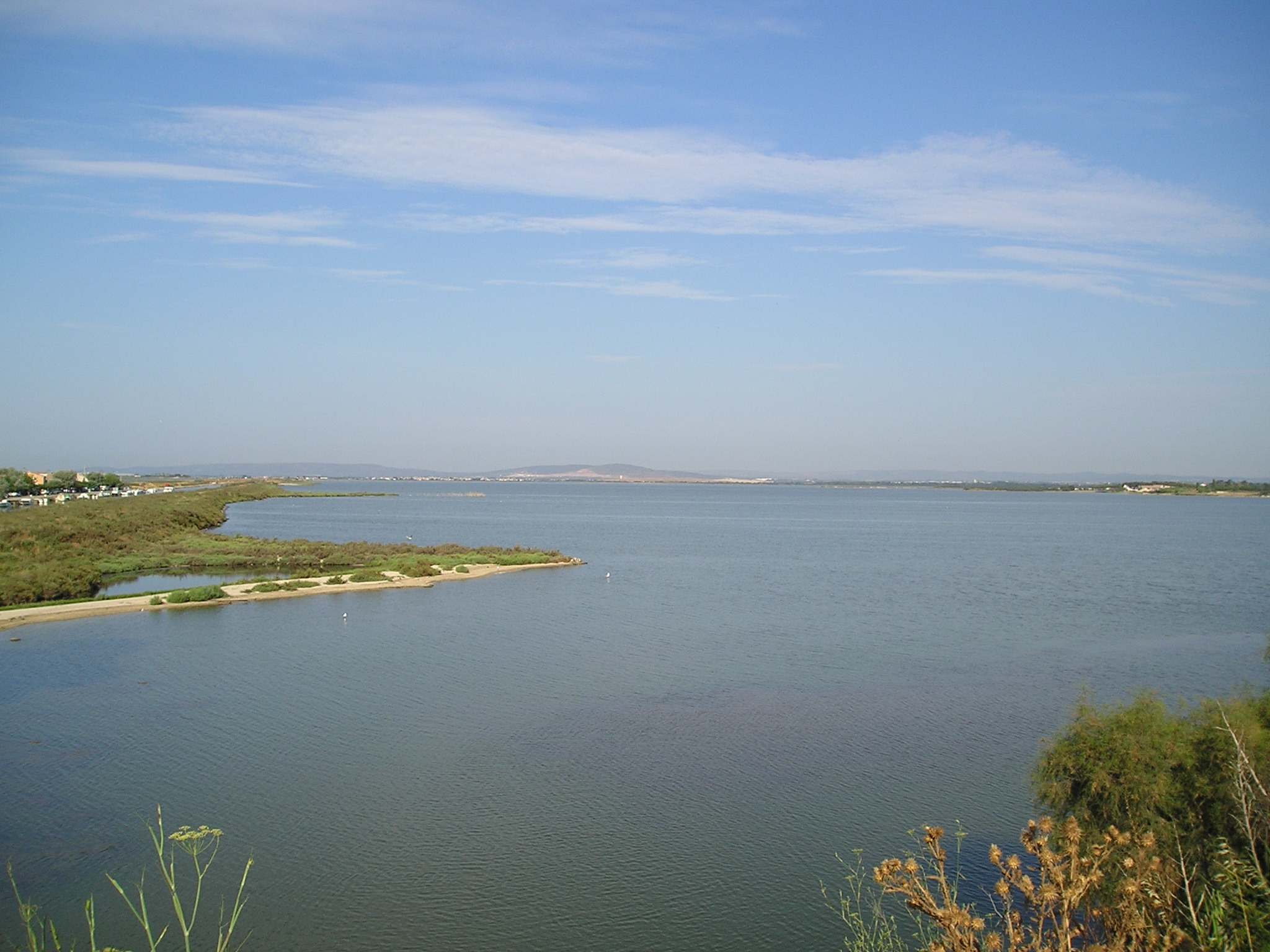
View of Étang du Méjean in Pérols

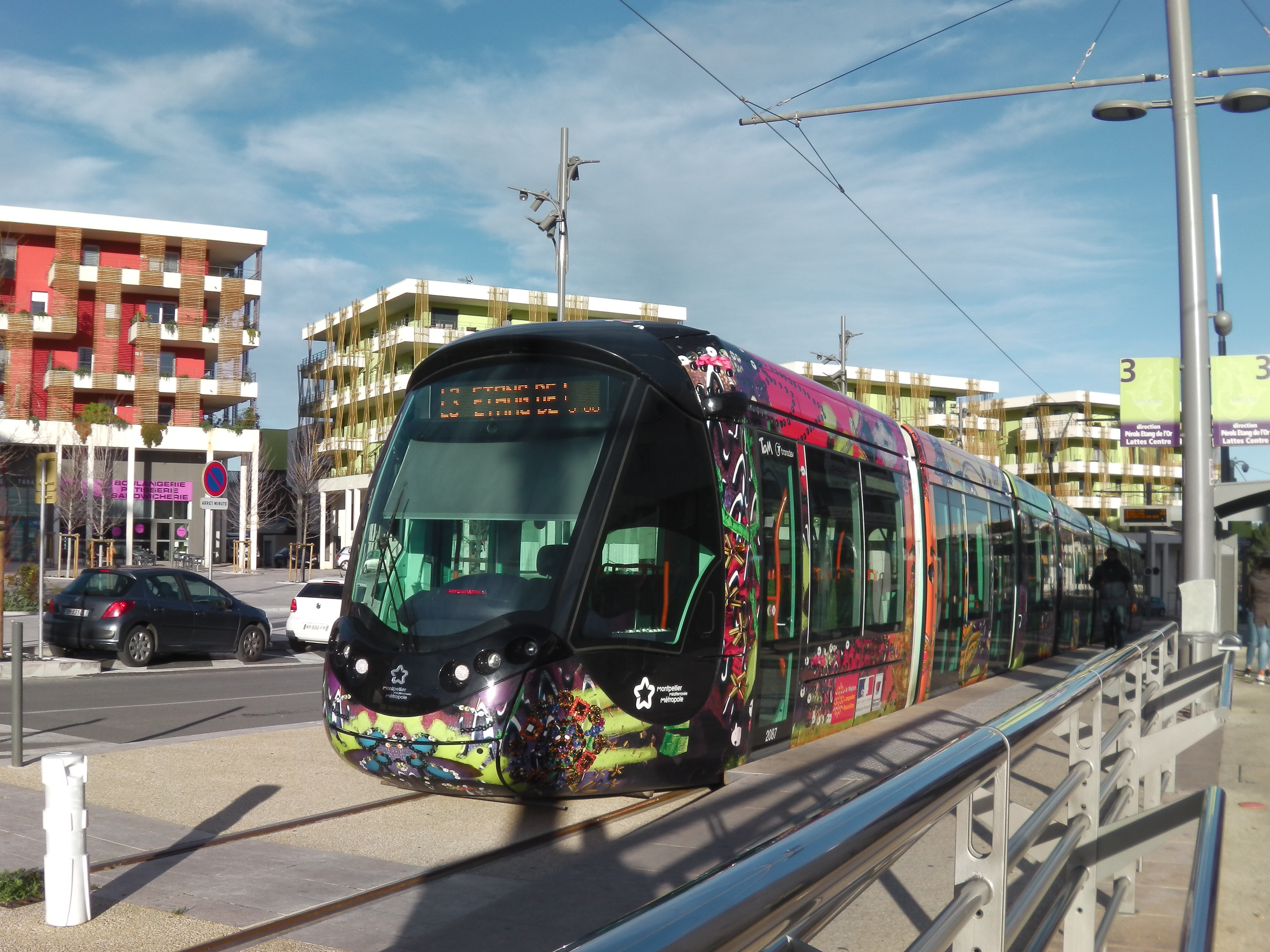
Tramway in Juvignac
