= Canton of Pignan =

Coordinates: 43.58°N 3.76°E

Pignan
- Canton
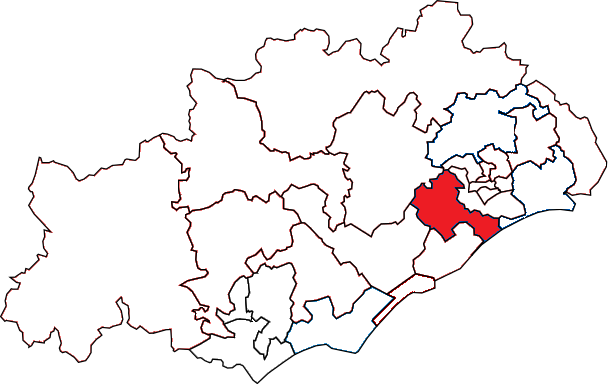
- Interactive map of Pignan
- Country: France
- Region: Occitania
- Department: Hérault
- No. of communes: {{{nbcomm}}}

Government
  - Representatives (2021–2028): Michelle Cassar; Jacques Martinier
- Area: 138.18 km^{2} (53.35 sq mi)
- Population (2023): 47,545
  - Density: 344.08/km^{2} (891.16/sq mi)
- INSEE code: 34 22

The canton of Pignan is an administrative division of the Hérault department, southern France. Its borders were modified at the French canton reorganisation which came into effect in March 2015. Its seat is in Pignan.

== Composition ==
It consists of the following communes:

1. Cournonsec
2. Cournonterral
3. Fabrègues
4. Murviel-lès-Montpellier
5. Pignan
6. Saint-Georges-d'Orques
7. Saussan
8. Villeneuve-lès-Maguelone

== Councillors ==
Election	Councillors	Party	Occupation
2015	Anne Amiel	LR	Councillor of Saint-Georges-d'Orques
2015	Jacques Martinier	DVD	Mayor of Fabrègues

== Pictures of the canton ==
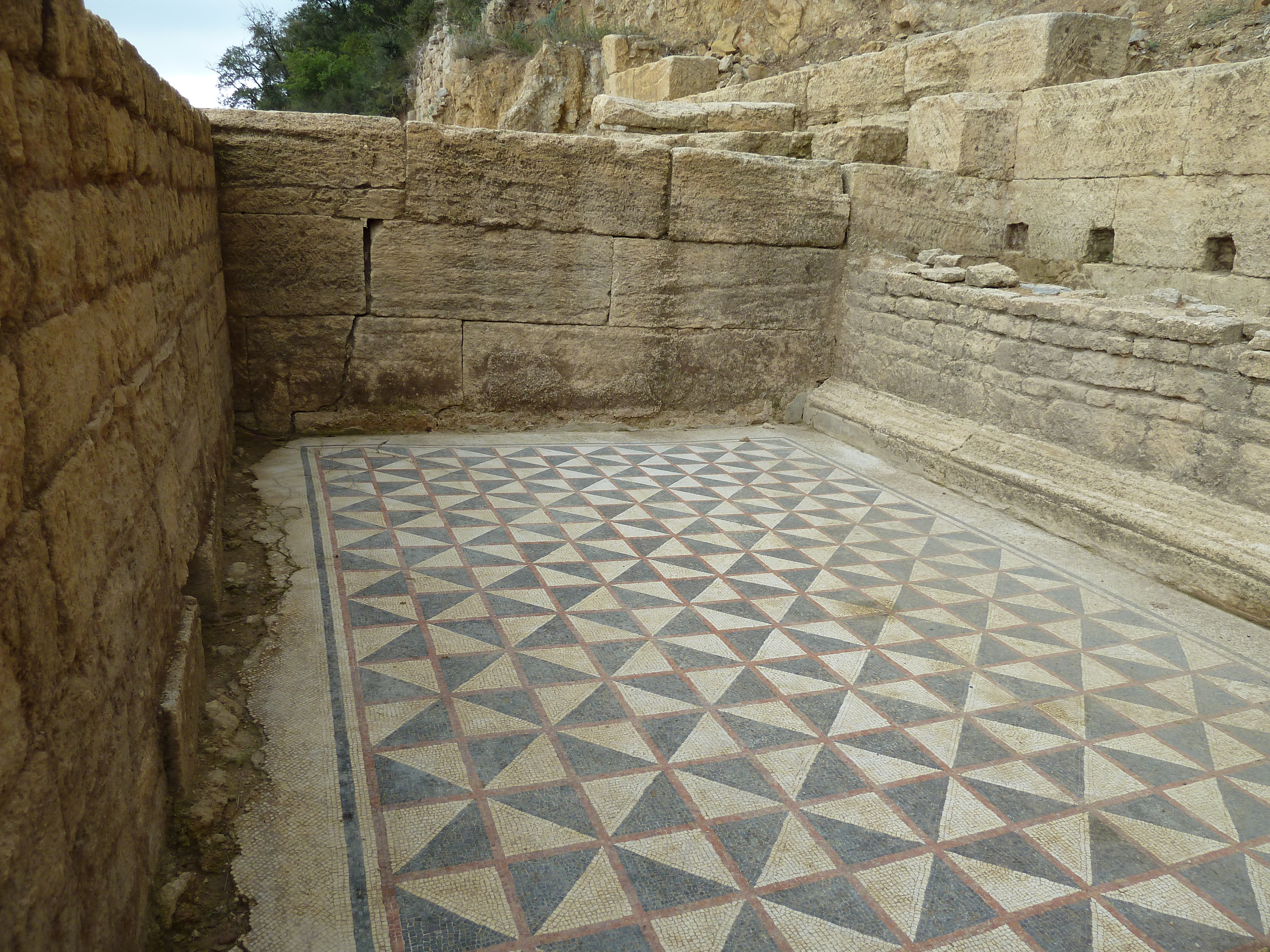
Oppidum d'Altimurium

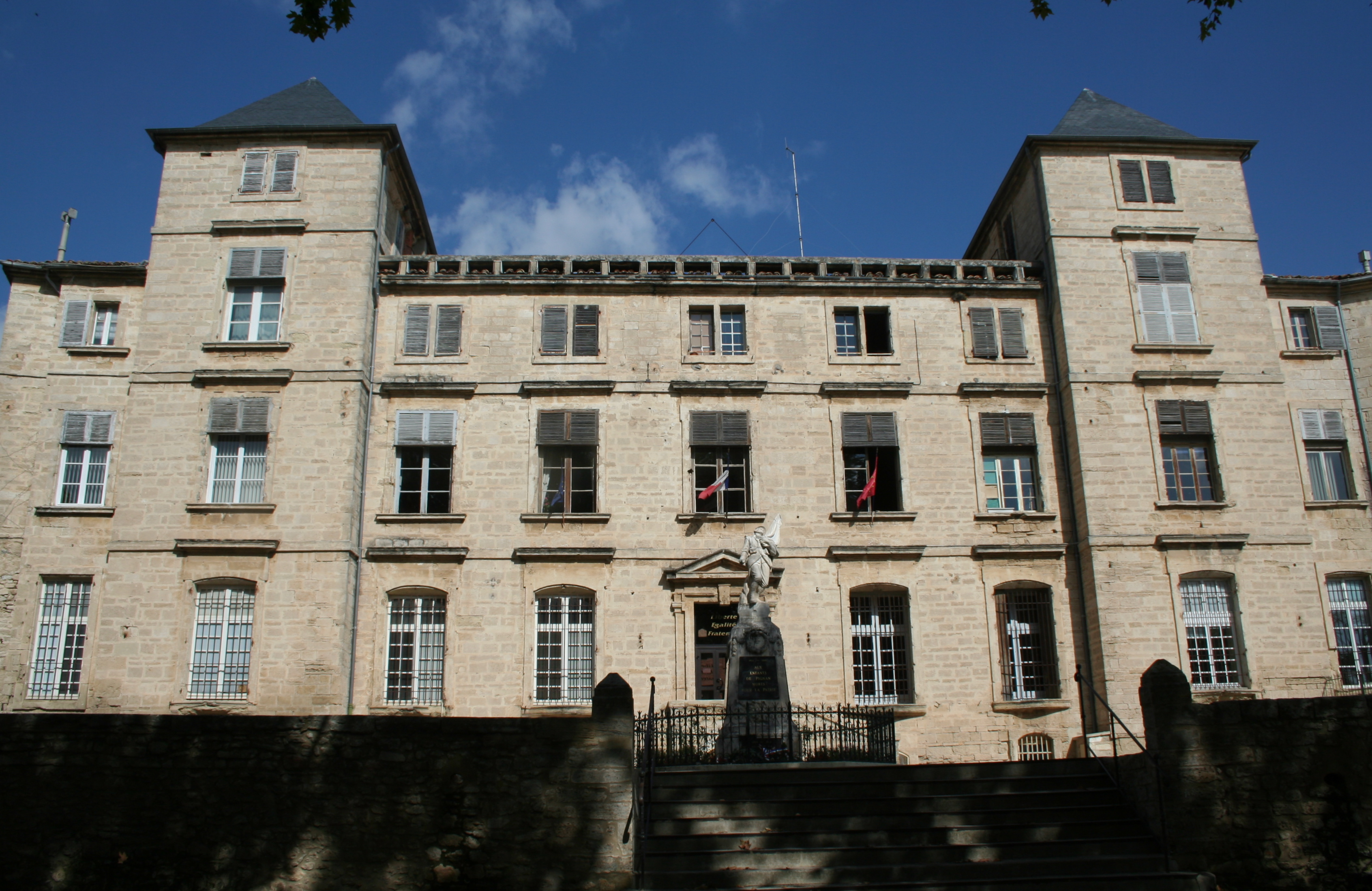
seat hall of Pignan

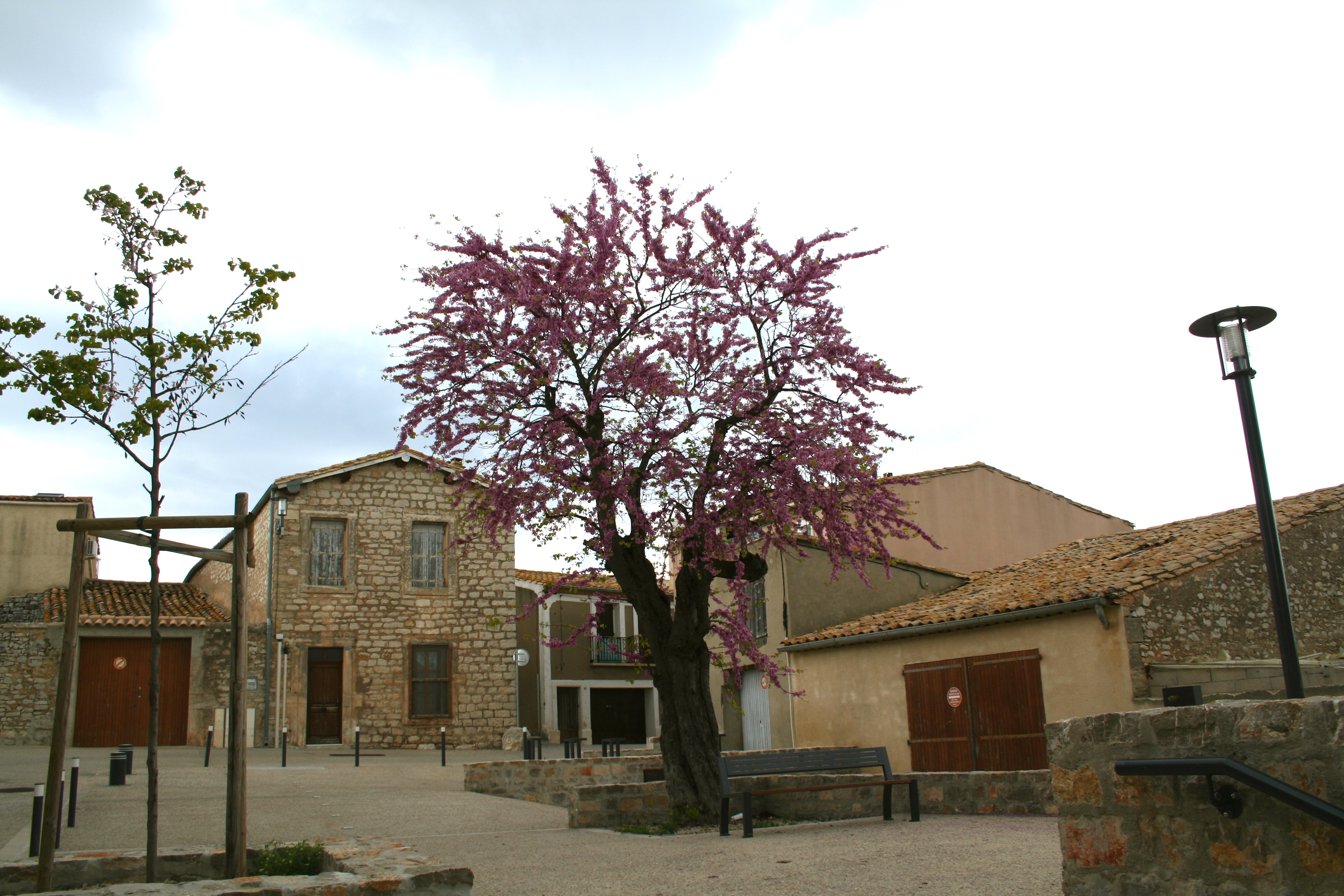
Square in Cournonsec
