= Agénor Azéma de Montgravier =

French archaeologist and soldier (1805–1863)

Michel Auguste Martin Agénor Azéma de Montgravier (28 October 1805, in Béziers – 14 September 1863, in Montpellier) was a French archaeologist and soldier.

== Career ==
He was one of the most distinguished students at the École Polytechnique from 1825 to 1828, then started his military career in the artillery. Promoted to lieutenant in 1831, captain in 1837 and then Chef d'escadron (Major or Commandant) in 1850, he completed his military career as deputy director of the Ecole d'Artillerie de Montpellier, to which he was appointed in 1859.

Montgravier spent three periods in Algeria, from 1832 to 1834, from 1839 to 1845, and finally from 1846 to 1851. In the first two periods he acted as Officer for Arab affairs, and in the third period he started as assistant officer in the Oran bureau, becoming chief officer in 1849 and then moving on in 1850 to the advisory committee on Algeria at the Ministry of War.

== Archaeology ==
He was passionate about antiques, and was one of the pioneers of Roman Archaeology in North Africa. In 1840, he was the first to identify Cherchell as the ancient Caesarea, the capital of Mauretania. He was an active member of the Société Historique Algérienne, and copied and published many ancient stone inscriptions discovered during his missions.

His contribution to North African Archaeology led to him being elected corresponding member of the Académie des Inscriptions et Belles-Lettres on 27 December 1850.

At the end of his life, he carried out excavations at the Roman ruins of Murviel-les-Montpellier on behalf of the Commission de la Carte des Gaules.

He was decorated with the Legion of Honour on 14 April 1844, and was created officer of the same order in 1862.

== Publications ==
- Lettre sur les inscriptions trouvées à Orléansville et à Tenez (1843)
- Observations sur les antiquités romaines de la province d'Oran et en particulier sur les ruines de Tiaret (1843)
- Les Tumulus de Lachdar, province d'Oran (1844)
- Études historiques pour servir au projet de colonisation d'une partie du territoire de la province d'Oran (1846)
- Excursions archéologiques d’Oran à Tlemcen (1847)
- Mémoire sur l’occupation de la Mauritanie par les Romains (couronné par la 1^{re} médaille au concours de 1848 à l'Académie des Inscriptions)
- Deux lettres au Président de la République (1849–1850)
- Les Deux Paris ou 1848 et 1858. Chant lyrique (1858)
- Murviel. Ruines d'un "oppidum" des Volces arécomiques (1863) en collaboration avec Adolphe Ricard
- Notice biographique sur M^{me} de Tencin (s.d.).
