= Pignan =

- Commune
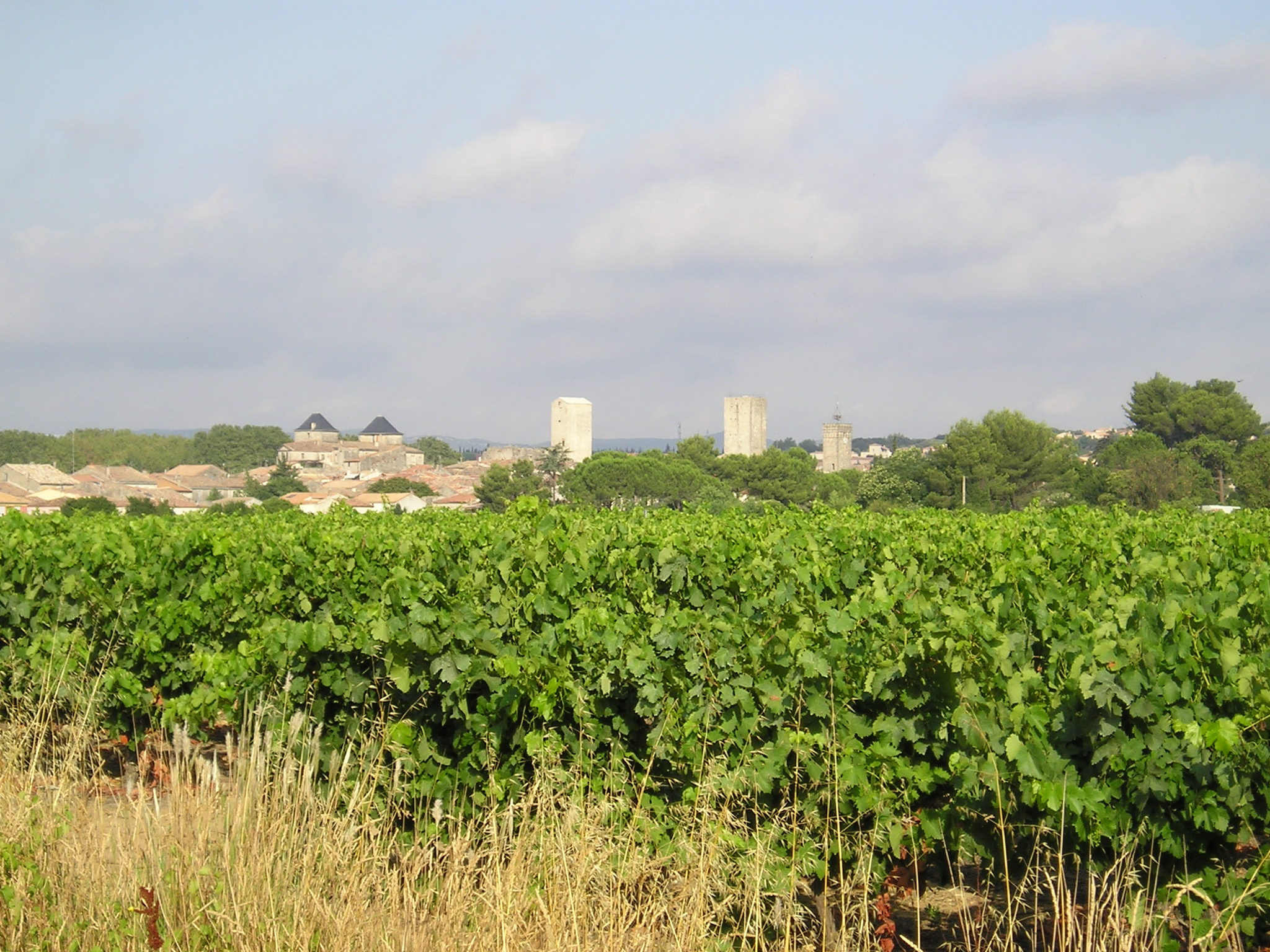
- A general view of Pignan

- Coat of arms
- Location of Pignan
- Location within France Location within Occitanie
- Coordinates: 43°35′07″N 3°45′45″E
- Country: France
- Region: Occitania
- Department: Hérault
- Arrondissement: Montpellier
- Canton: Pignan
- Intercommunality: Montpellier Méditerranée Métropole

Government
  - Mayor (2020–2026): Michelle Cassar
- Area^{1}: 20.32 km^{2} (7.85 sq mi)
- Highest elevation: 217 m (712 ft)
- Lowest elevation: 29 m (95 ft)
- Population (2023): 8,431
  - Density: 414.9/km^{2} (1,075/sq mi)
- Time zone: UTC+01:00 (CET)
  - Summer (DST): UTC+02:00 (CEST)
- INSEE/Postal code: 34202 /34570
- ^{1} French Land Register data, which excludes lakes, ponds, glaciers > 1 km^{2} (0.386 sq mi or 247 acres) and river estuaries.

Pignan (French pronunciation: [piɲɑ̃]; Occitan: Pinhan) is a commune in the Hérault department in the Occitanie region in southern France.

== Population ==
Historical population

Year	Pop.	±% p.a.
1793	1,414	—
1800	1,566	+1.47%
1806	1,541	−0.27%
1821	1,809	+1.07%
1831	1,889	+0.43%
1836	2,012	+1.27%
1841	1,925	−0.88%
1846	2,018	+0.95%
1851	1,903	−1.17%
1856	1,891	−0.13%
1861	1,952	+0.64%
1866	2,158	+2.03%
1872	2,166	+0.06%
1876	2,081	−1.00%
1881	1,757	−3.33%
1886	1,835	+0.87%
1891	1,882	+0.51%
1896	2,167	+2.86%
1901	2,113	−0.50%

Year	Pop.	±% p.a.
1906	1,949	−1.60%
1911	1,859	−0.94%
1921	1,819	−0.22%
1926	1,755	−0.71%
1931	1,766	+0.13%
1936	1,644	−1.42%
1946	1,509	−0.85%
1954	1,680	+1.35%
1962	1,905	+1.58%
1968	2,216	+2.55%
1975	2,677	+2.74%
1982	3,319	+3.12%
1990	4,097	+2.67%
1999	5,665	+3.67%
2007	6,092	+0.91%
2012	6,525	+1.38%
2017	7,019	+1.47%
2023	8,431	+3.10%

Source: EHESS and INSEE (1968-2023)

== See also ==
- Communes of the Hérault department
