= Saussan =

- Commune
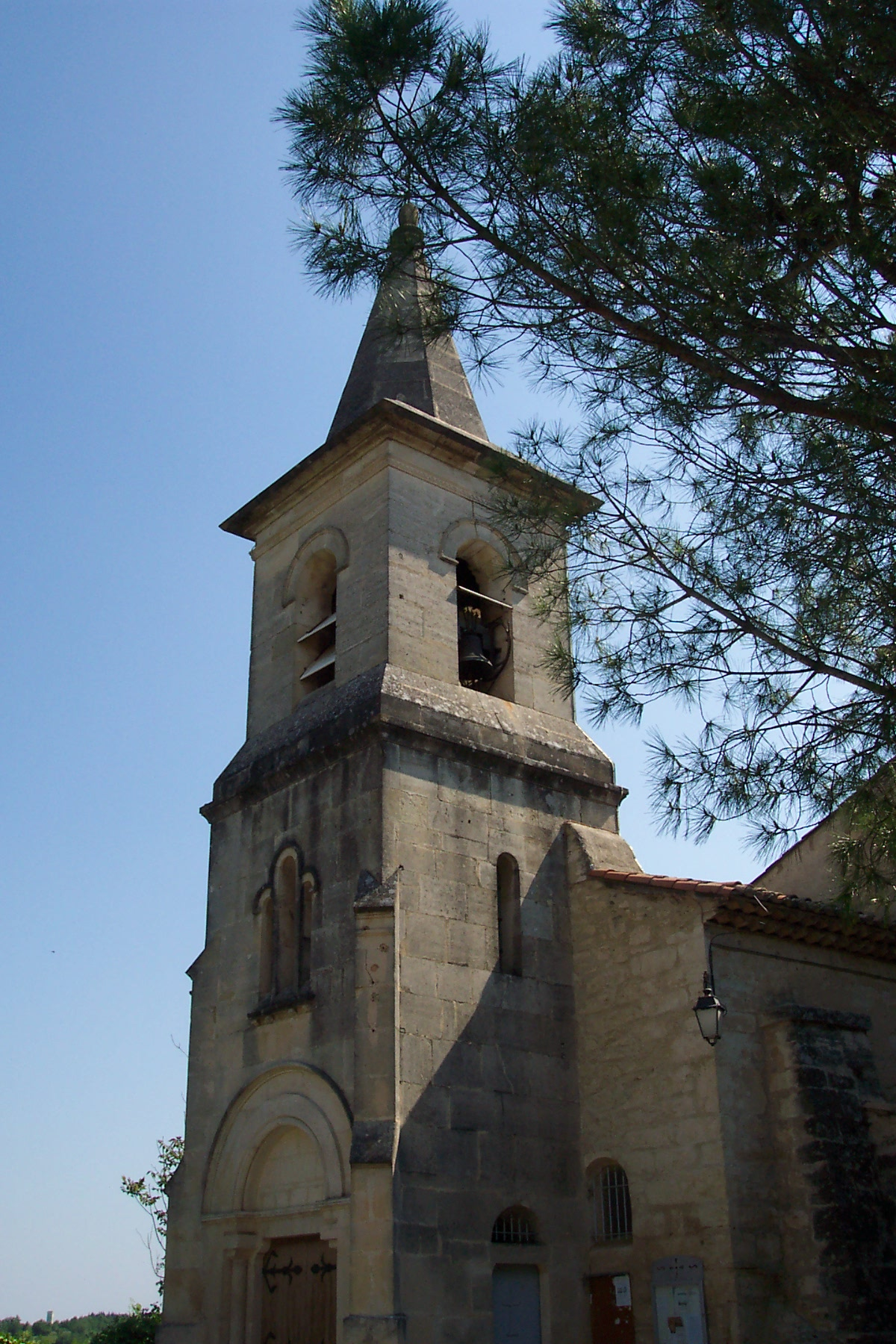
- The church of Saussan

- Coat of arms
- Location of Saussan
- Location within France Location within Occitanie
- Coordinates: 43°34′20″N 3°46′30″E
- Country: France
- Region: Occitania
- Department: Hérault
- Arrondissement: Montpellier
- Canton: Pignan
- Intercommunality: Montpellier Méditerranée Métropole

Government
  - Mayor (2020–2026): Joël Vera
- Area^{1}: 3.6 km^{2} (1.4 sq mi)
- Elevation: 23 m (75 ft)
- Highest elevation: 53 m (174 ft)
- Lowest elevation: 13 m (43 ft)
- Population (2023): 2,069
  - Density: 570/km^{2} (1,500/sq mi)
- Time zone: UTC+01:00 (CET)
  - Summer (DST): UTC+02:00 (CEST)
- INSEE/Postal code: 34295 /34570
- ^{1} French Land Register data, which excludes lakes, ponds, glaciers > 1 km^{2} (0.386 sq mi or 247 acres) and river estuaries.

Saussan (French pronunciation: [sosɑ̃]; Occitan: Çaussan) is a commune in the Hérault department in the Occitanie region in southern France.

== Population ==
Historical population
Year	Pop.	±% p.a.
1968	425	—
1975	526	+3.09%
1982	808	+6.32%
1990	1,166	+4.69%
1999	1,445	+2.41%
2007	1,482	+0.32%
2012	1,463	−0.26%
2017	1,588	+1.65%
2023	2,069	+4.51%
Source: INSEE

== See also ==
- Communes of the Hérault department
