= Étang du Méjean =

- Location within France
- Location: Hérault, southern France
- Coordinates: 43.545811°N 3.927585°E
- Type: Lagoon
- Surface elevation: 0 m (0 ft)
- Settlements: Palavas-les-Flots; Lattes; Pérols

The Étang du Méjean, the "pond of Méjean" (sometimes called Étang de Pérols in its eastern part) is part of the lagoon complex of the Palavas ponds (Étangs palavasiens). It is located in the Hérault department, in southern France, on the Mediterranean coast.

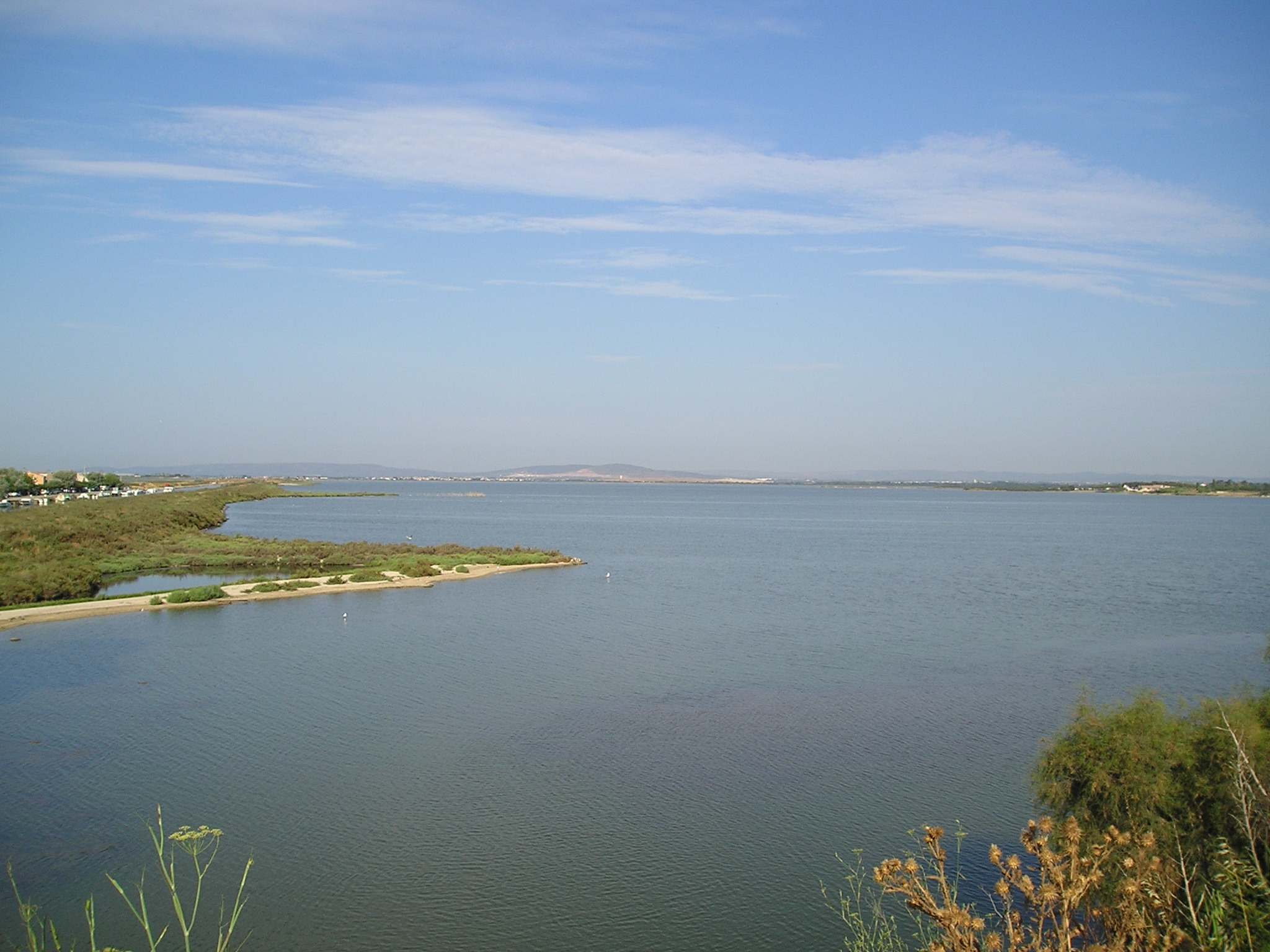
Étang du Méjean seen from the bridge of Carnon looking to the west. Left, the Canal du Rhône à Sète.

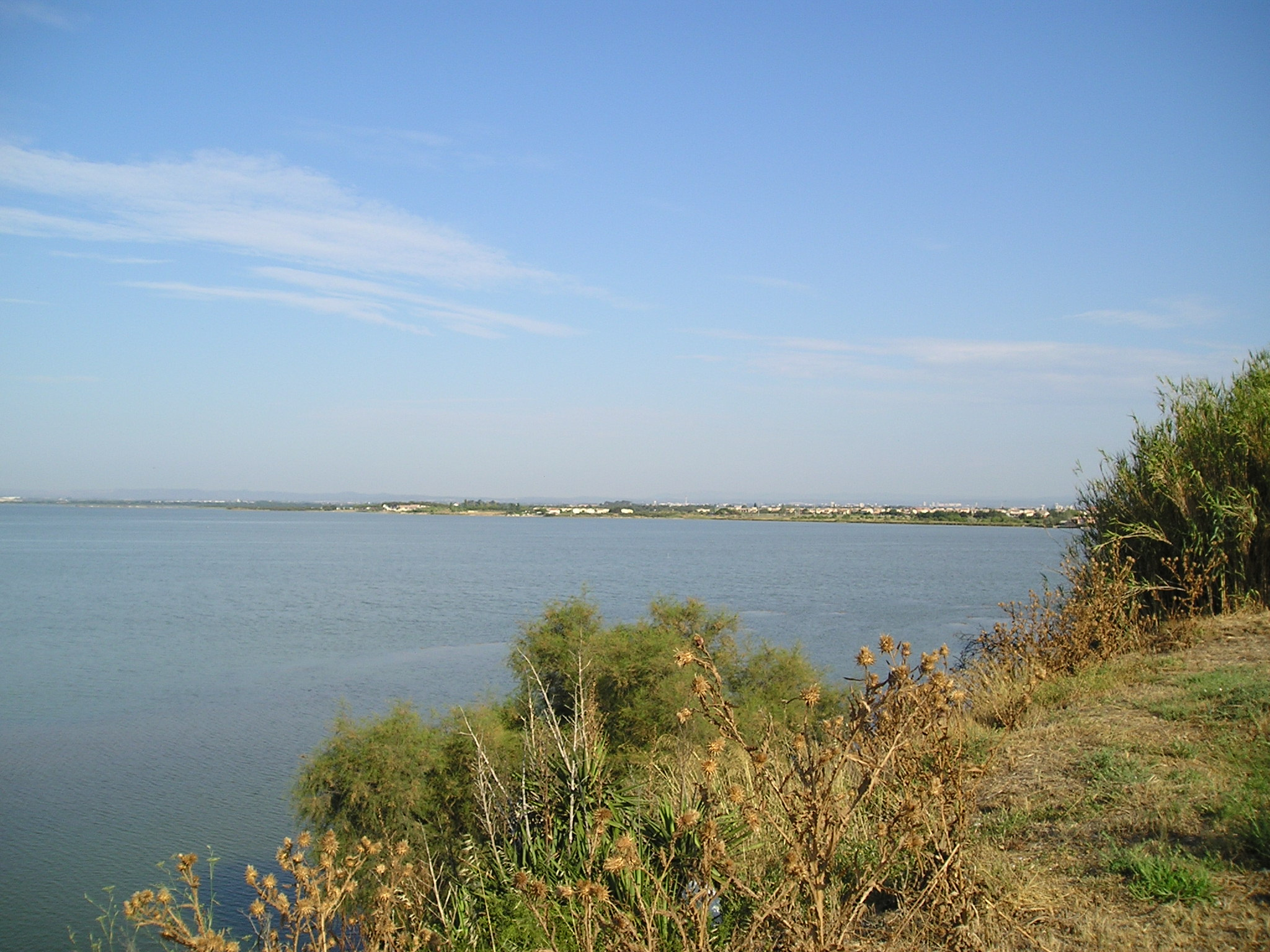
Étang du Méjean looking to the northwest. Right, the town of Pérols.

== See also ==
- Étang de l'Or
