= Cournonsec =

- Commune
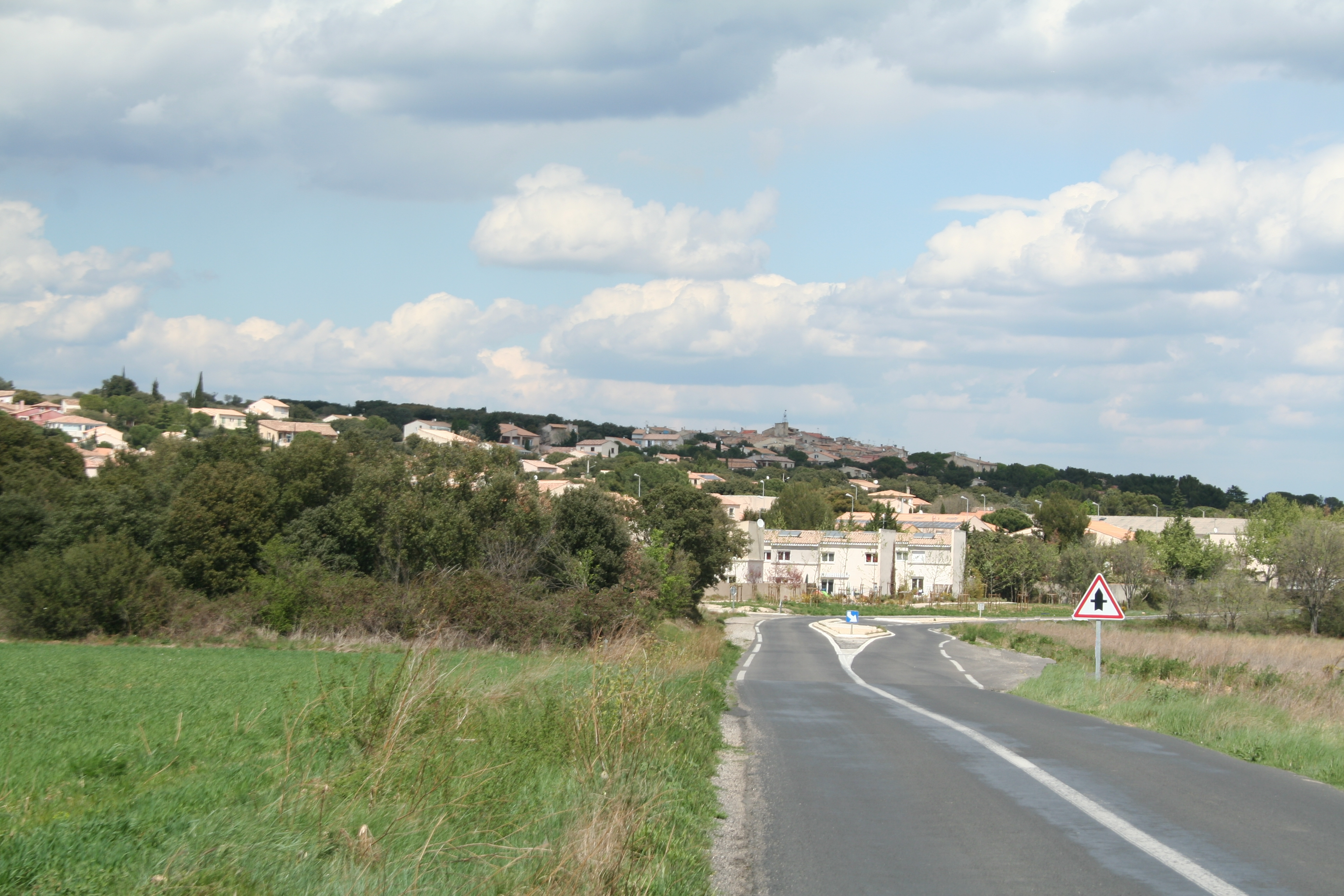
- Cournonsec

- Coat of arms
- Location of Cournonsec
- Location within France Location within Occitanie
- Coordinates: 43°32′58″N 3°42′20″E
- Country: France
- Region: Occitania
- Department: Hérault
- Arrondissement: Montpellier
- Canton: Pignan
- Intercommunality: Montpellier Méditerranée Métropole

Government
  - Mayor (2026–32): Richard Paul
- Area^{1}: 12.06 km^{2} (4.66 sq mi)
- Elevation: 63 m (207 ft)
- Highest elevation: 156 m (512 ft)
- Lowest elevation: 34 m (112 ft)
- Population (2023): 3,616
  - Density: 299.8/km^{2} (776.6/sq mi)
- Time zone: UTC+01:00 (CET)
  - Summer (DST): UTC+02:00 (CEST)
- INSEE/Postal code: 34087 /34660
- ^{1} French Land Register data, which excludes lakes, ponds, glaciers > 1 km^{2} (0.386 sq mi or 247 acres) and river estuaries.

Cournonsec (French pronunciation: [kuʁnɔ̃sɛk]; Occitan: Cornonsec) is a commune in the Hérault department in southern France.

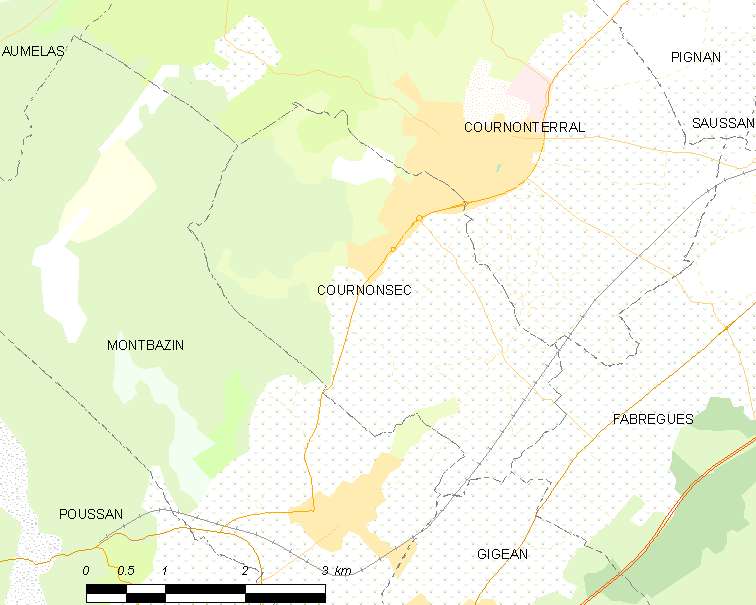
Map

== Population ==
Historical population
Year	Pop.	±% p.a.
1968	555	—
1975	603	+1.19%
1982	856	+5.13%
1990	1,122	+3.44%
1999	1,964	+6.42%
2007	2,122	+0.97%
2012	2,742	+5.26%
2017	3,397	+4.38%
2023	3,616	+1.05%
Source: INSEE

== See also ==
- Communes of the Hérault department
