= Étang de l'Or =

- Location within France
- Location: Hérault
- Coordinates: 43°34′56″N 4°2′42″E
- Type: brackish lagoon
- Catchment area: 400 km^{2} (150 sq mi)
- Basin countries: France
- Max. length: 15 km (9.3 mi)
- Max. width: 4 km (2.5 mi)
- Surface area: 30 km^{2} (12 sq mi)
- Average depth: 0.8 m (2 ft 7 in)
- Surface elevation: 0 m (0 ft)

Étang de l'Or, or Golden Lagoon, is a large, shallow, brackish body of water in the Département of Hérault in the south of France. Its surface area is 30 km². Being directly connected to the Mediterranean Sea and to several adjacent lagoons, its elevation is zero.

== See also ==
- Étang du Méjean
