= Murviel-lès-Montpellier =

- Commune
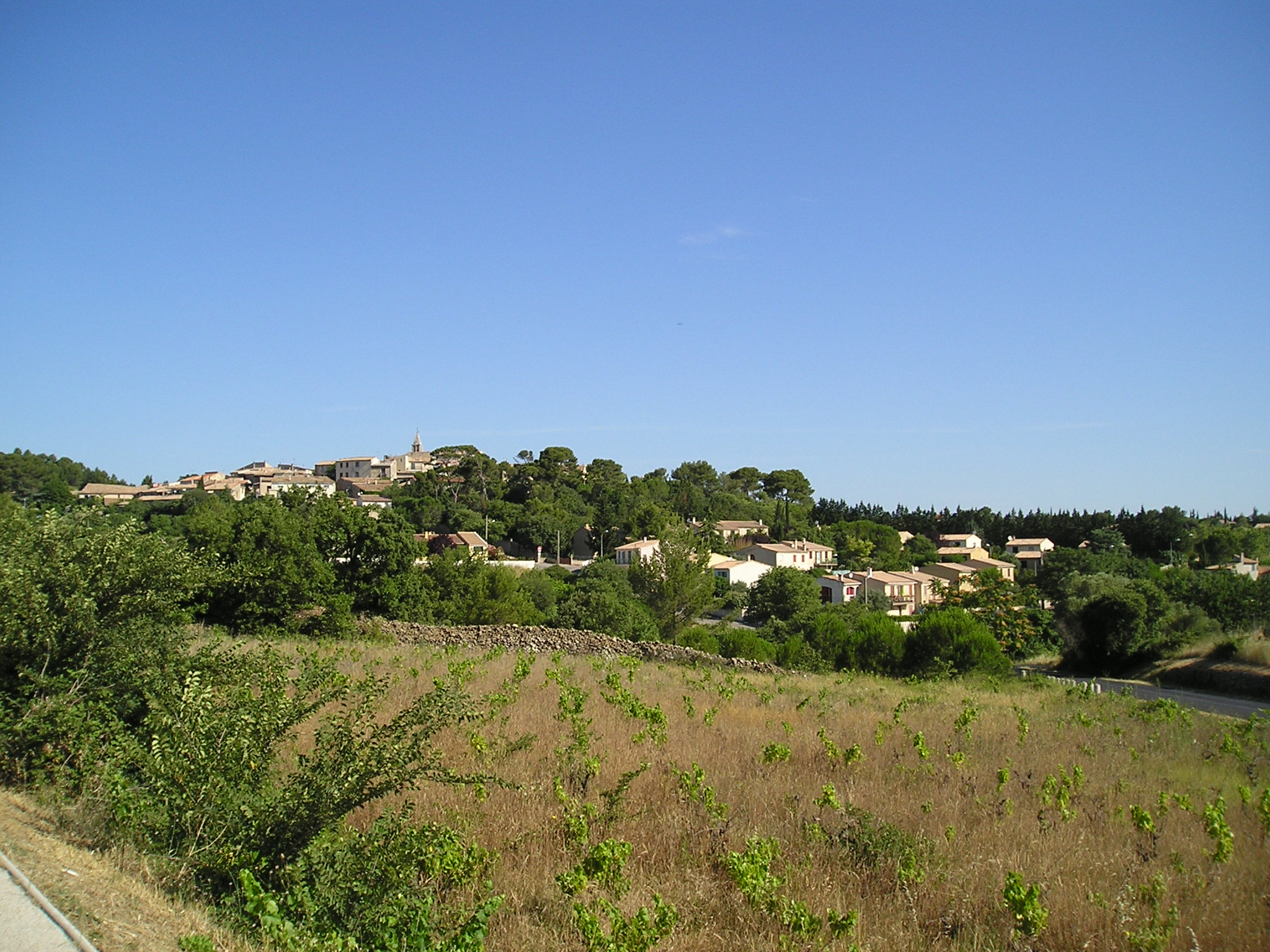
- A general view of Murviel-lès-Montpellier

- Coat of arms
- Location of Murviel-lès-Montpellier
- Location within France Location within Occitanie
- Coordinates: 43°36′19″N 3°44′15″E
- Country: France
- Region: Occitania
- Department: Hérault
- Arrondissement: Montpellier
- Canton: Pignan
- Intercommunality: Montpellier Méditerranée Métropole

Government
  - Mayor (2020–2026): Isabelle Touzard
- Area^{1}: 10.11 km^{2} (3.90 sq mi)
- Elevation: 150 m (490 ft)
- Highest elevation: 236 m (774 ft)
- Lowest elevation: 66 m (217 ft)
- Population (2023): 2,075
  - Density: 205.2/km^{2} (531.6/sq mi)
- Time zone: UTC+01:00 (CET)
  - Summer (DST): UTC+02:00 (CEST)
- INSEE/Postal code: 34179 /34570
- ^{1} French Land Register data, which excludes lakes, ponds, glaciers > 1 km^{2} (0.386 sq mi or 247 acres) and river estuaries.

Murviel-lès-Montpellier (French pronunciation: [myʁvjɛl lɛ mɔ̃pəlje], literally Murviel near Montpellier; Languedocien: Mervièlh) is a commune in the Hérault department in the Occitanie region in southern France.

The Oppidum d'Altimurium, also known as the Oppidum Murviel-les-Montpellier, is an ancient hill-town (or oppidum) located near the village.

Agénor Azéma de Montgravier, pioneering archaeologist, carried out excavations in the mid 19th century at the Roman ruins of Murviel-lès-Montpellier on behalf of the Commission de la Carte des Gaules. An archaeological museum with some artifacts from the site is located in Murviel-les-Montpellier.

== Population ==
Historical population
Year	Pop.	±% p.a.
1968	424	—
1975	441	+0.56%
1982	687	+6.54%
1990	935	+3.93%
1999	1,208	+2.89%
2007	1,658	+4.04%
2012	1,877	+2.51%
2017	1,883	+0.06%
2023	2,075	+1.63%
Source: INSEE

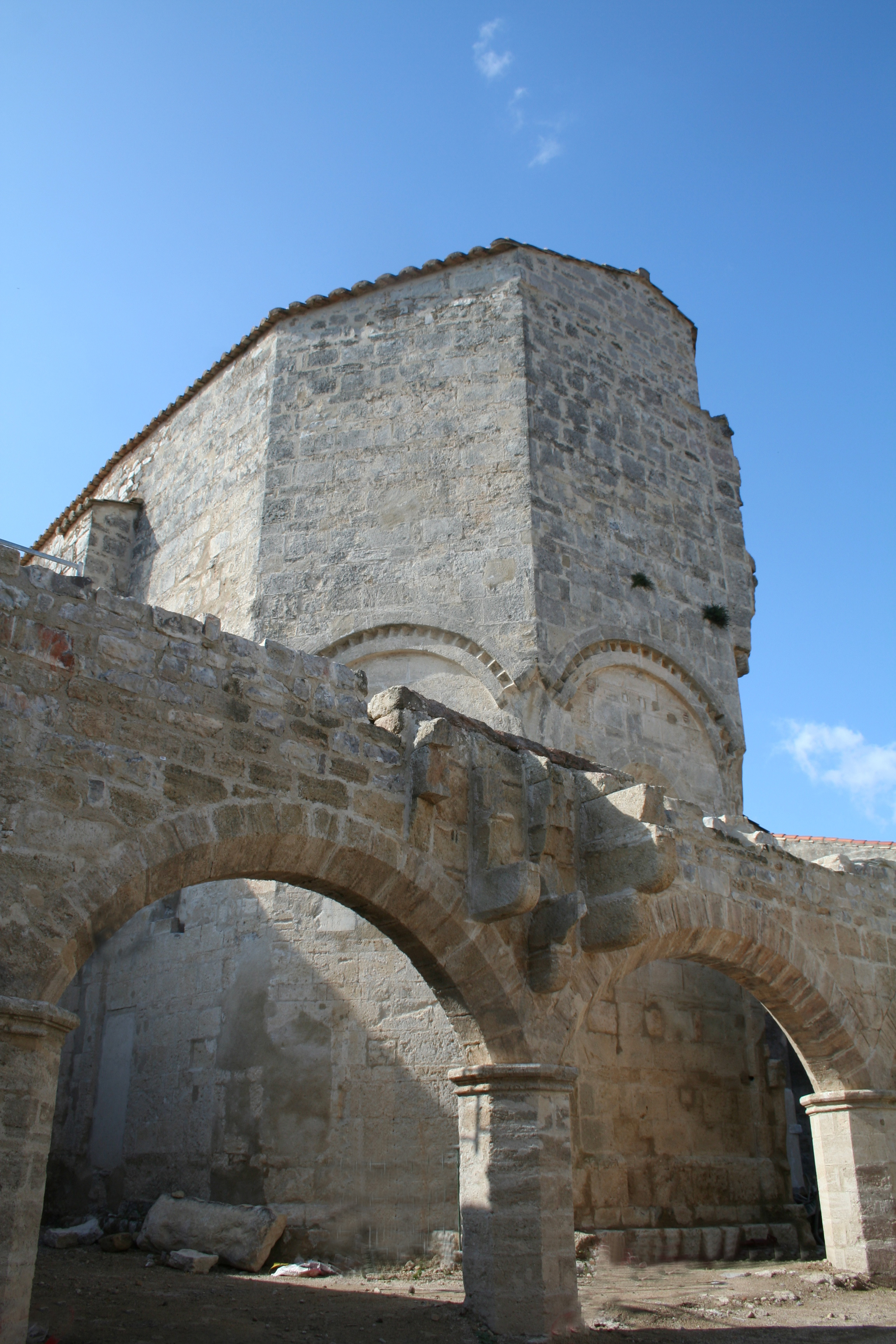
Romanesque polygonal apse of Saint-Jean-Baptiste church

== See also ==
- Communes of the Hérault department
