= Lattes, Hérault =

Lattes
- Commune
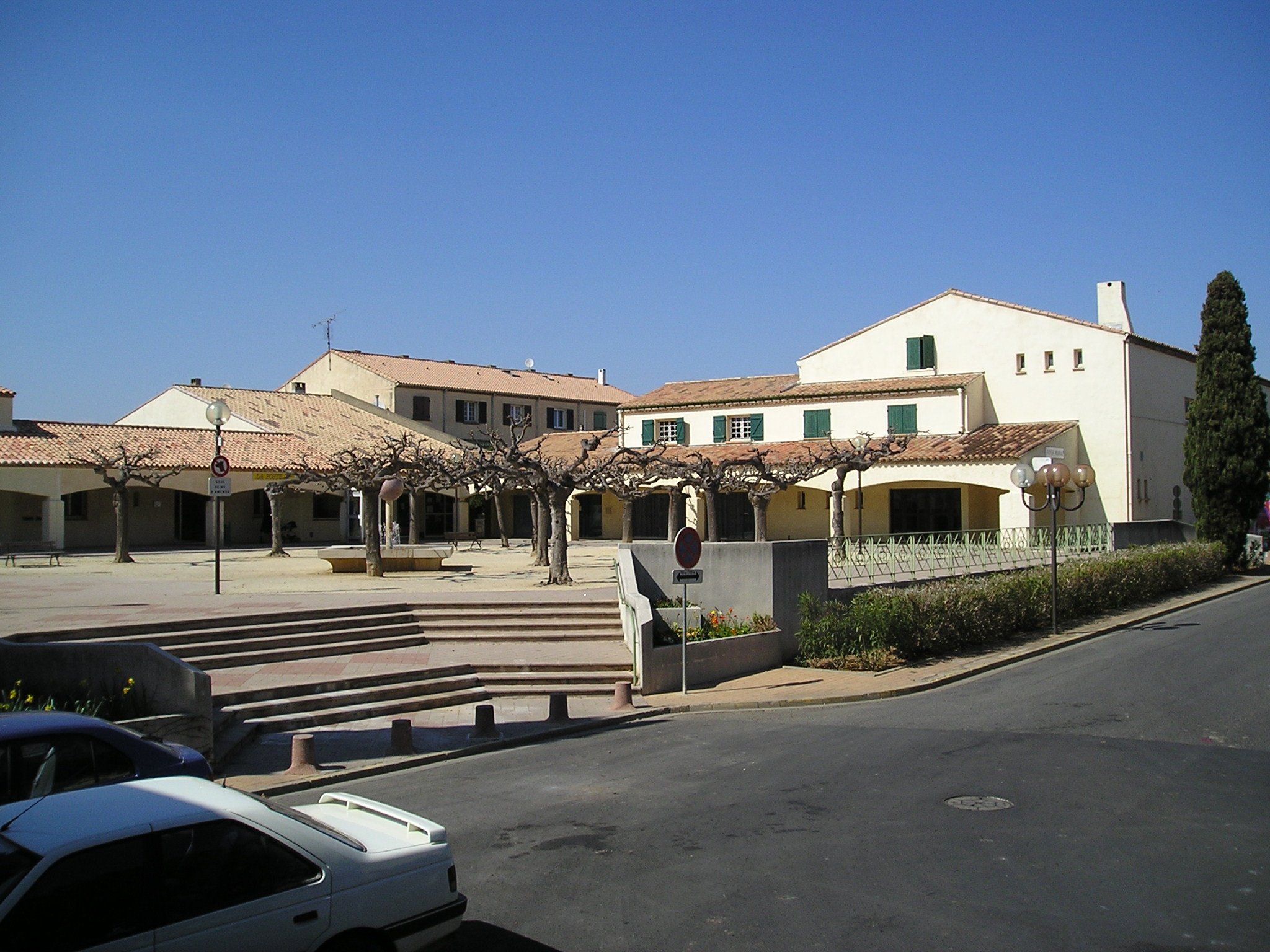
- The Place des Arcades in Maurin

- Coat of arms
- Location of Lattes
- Location within France Location within Occitanie
- Coordinates: 43°34′12″N 3°54′34″E
- Country: France
- Region: Occitania
- Department: Hérault
- Arrondissement: Montpellier
- Canton: Lattes
- Intercommunality: Montpellier Méditerranée Métropole

Government
  - Mayor (2020–2026): Cyril Meunier
- Area^{1}: 27.83 km^{2} (10.75 sq mi)
- Highest elevation: 26 m (85 ft)
- Lowest elevation: 0 m (0 ft)
- Population (2023): 17,351
  - Density: 623.5/km^{2} (1,615/sq mi)
- Time zone: UTC+01:00 (CET)
  - Summer (DST): UTC+02:00 (CEST)
- INSEE/Postal code: 34129 /34970
- ^{1} French Land Register data, which excludes lakes, ponds, glaciers > 1 km^{2} (0.386 sq mi or 247 acres) and river estuaries.

Lattes (French pronunciation: [lat]; Occitan: Latas) is a commune in the Hérault département in the Occitanie region in southern France, located just on the outskirts of Montpellier.

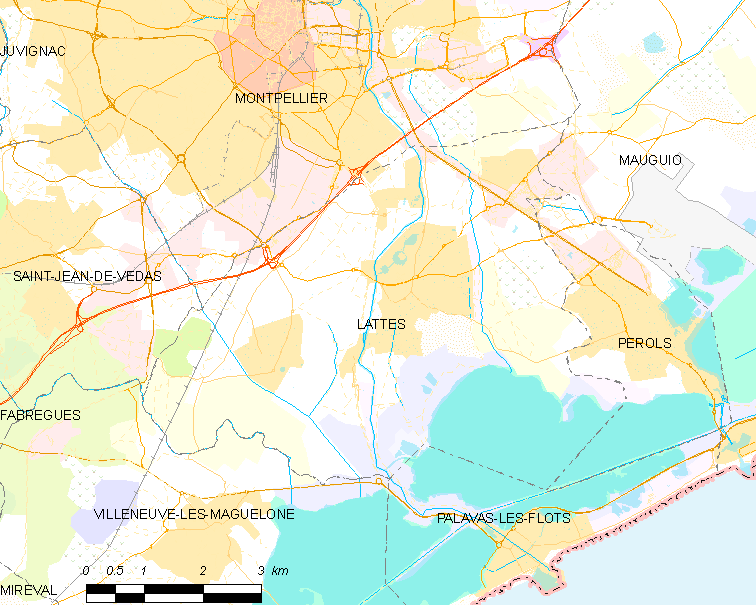
Map

== Geography ==
Lattes is located in the South of the prefecture of Montpellier in a plain split by the river Lez, that flows to the Mediterranean Sea at Palavas-les-Flots. Stretching from west to east, the hills announce the typical relief within the department.

The territory of the municipality is partially liable to flooding, when the level of the Lez rises. Areas near the river Lez and the [Mosson river] were protected by dykes. An environmental inspection report pointed the risk of three hundred dead in Lattes-Centre and other localities like les Marestelles and the necessity to provide accommodation. A spillway has been built in 2010.

The majority of the city's inhabitants live in the left bank where most of the business takes place. The Lattes-Centre and the [Boirargues] district are still separated by some farms, unused field and important commercial areas on the road going from Carnon to Montpellier.

In the south of Lattes, toward the coastline, the Pond of Mejean is the main site of the nature reserve where it is possible to appreciate bird watching. The natural house is the right place, at the entrance, to get some information about the Méjean ornithological park.

== Population ==
Historical population

Year	Pop.	±% p.a.
1793	315	—
1800	204	−6.02%
1806	209	+0.40%
1821	307	+2.60%
1831	363	+1.69%
1836	320	−2.49%
1841	331	+0.68%
1846	367	+2.09%
1851	385	+0.96%
1856	403	+0.92%
1861	409	+0.30%
1866	450	+1.93%
1872	405	−1.74%
1876	440	+2.09%
1881	463	+1.02%
1886	521	+2.39%
1891	653	+4.62%
1896	773	+3.43%
1901	780	+0.18%

Year	Pop.	±% p.a.
1906	938	+3.76%
1911	960	+0.46%
1921	1,000	+0.41%
1926	1,128	+2.44%
1931	1,260	+2.24%
1936	1,243	−0.27%
1946	1,241	−0.02%
1954	1,297	+0.55%
1962	1,488	+1.73%
1968	2,379	+8.13%
1975	3,963	+7.56%
1982	8,154	+10.86%
1990	10,203	+2.84%
1999	13,768	+3.39%
2007	16,635	+2.39%
2012	15,719	−1.13%
2017	16,564	+1.05%
2023	17,351	+0.78%

Source: EHESS and INSEE (1968-2023)

== See also ==
- Communes of the Hérault department
