= Oppidum d'Altimurium =

Coordinates: 43°36′32″N 3°44′5″E

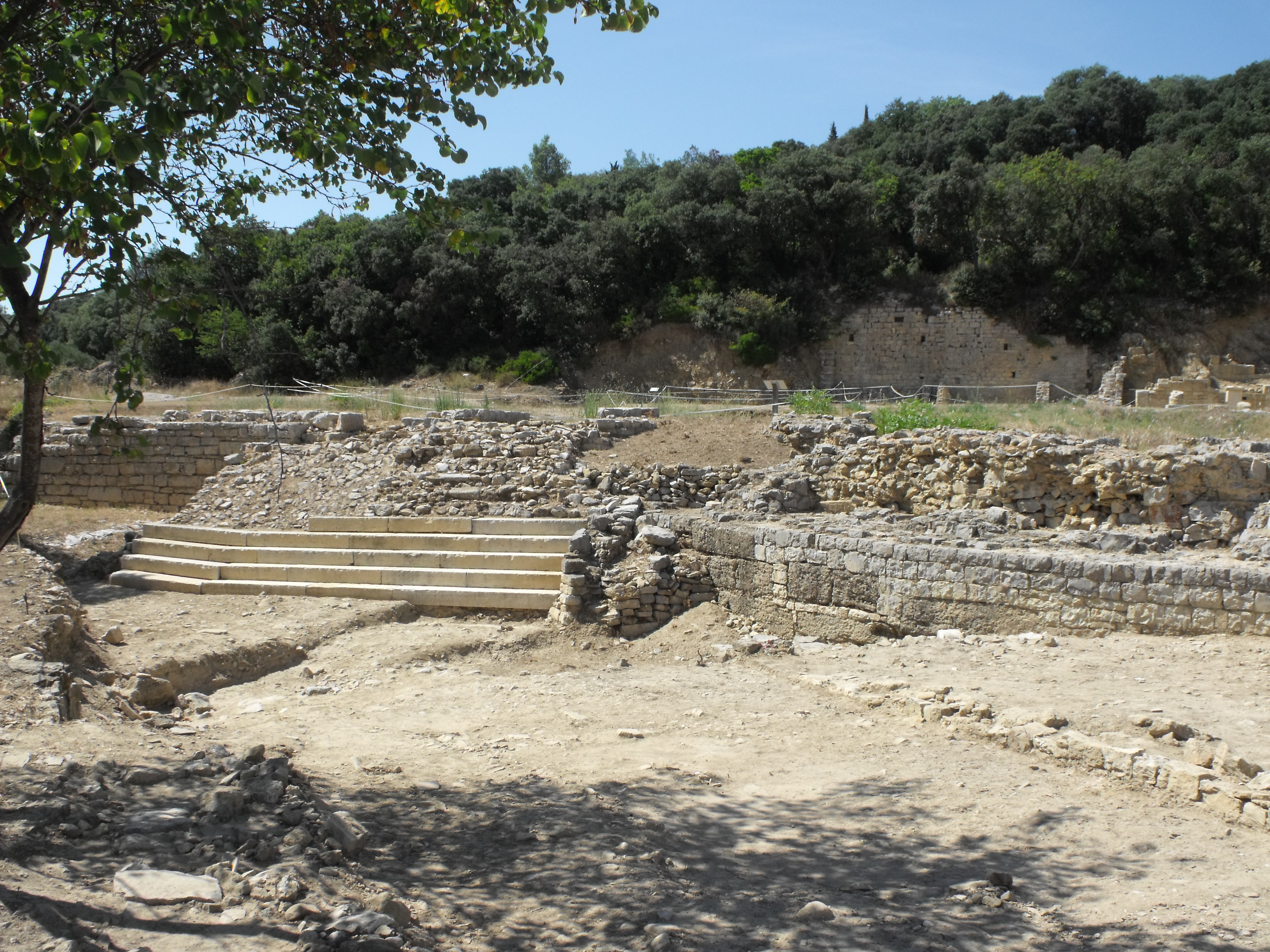

The Oppidum d’Altimurium, also known as the Oppidum Murviel-les-Montpellier, is an ancient hill-town (or oppidum) near the village of Murviel-lès-Montpellier, France, located between Montpellier and Béziers. It has been listed since 1896 as a monument historique by the French Ministry of Culture.

The site, which overlooks the Montpellier garrigue at 190m altitude and covers about 20 hectares, is one of the largest hill forts in the region, on par with those of Ensérune or Ambrussum.

It was founded in the 2nd century BC, and was protected by a 1st-century BC wall almost 2 km long. The city was divided into two zones: the upper town atop the hill and the lower town on the slopes, down almost to the present town of Murviel-les-Montpellier.

The Roman monumental area, located between the upper town and lower town of the oppidum, contains a square 75m long, rooms built against the hill, 2 large porches arranged on each side of the square, and a large building of the Corinthian order which was probably a temple.

Much of the site is now protected and is open to the public as a major historical site in the Montpellier region. In 2009, excavations were still in progress. An archaeological museum with some artifacts from the site is located in Murviel-les-Montpellier.
