= Fabrègues =

- Commune
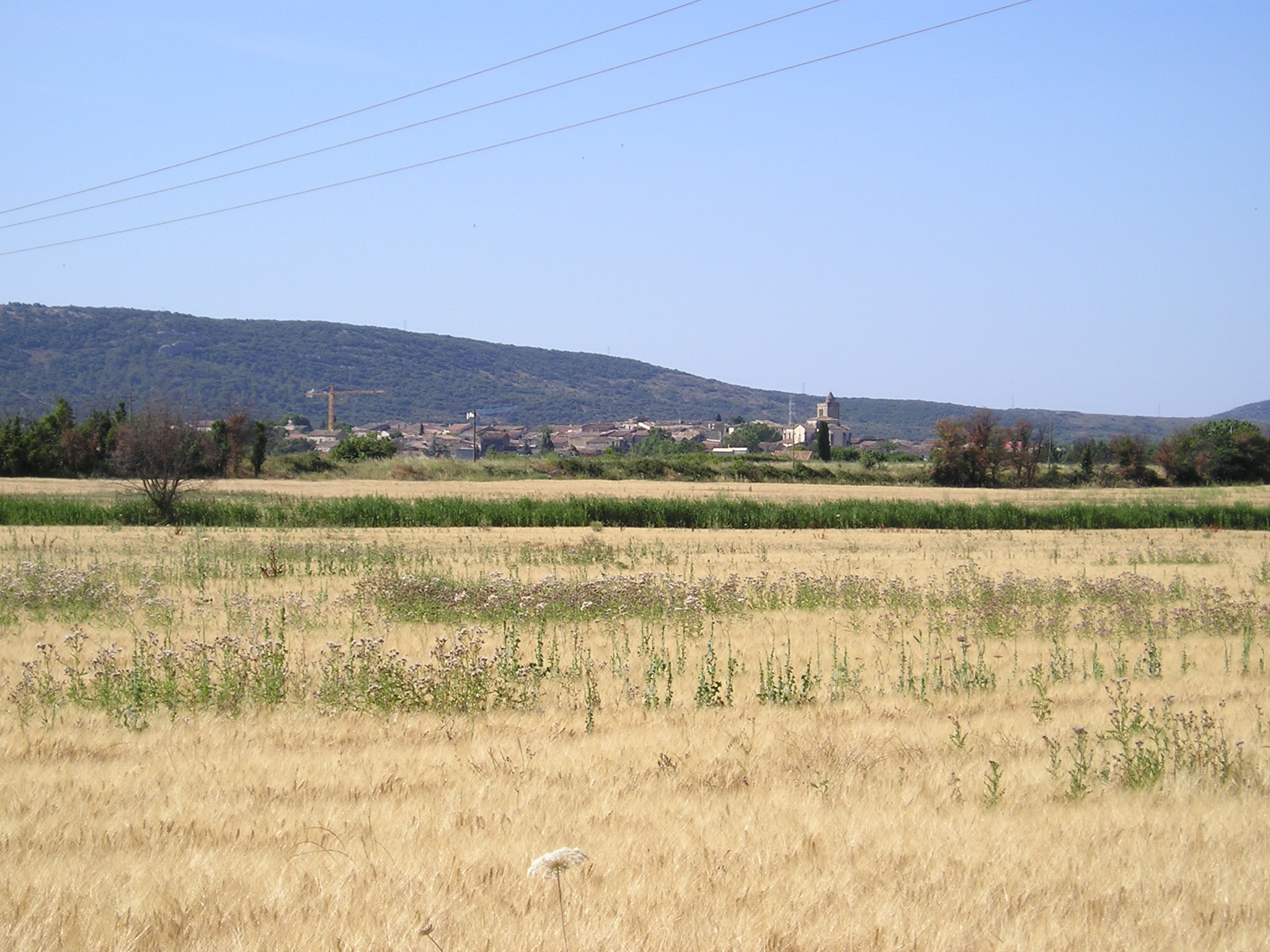
- A general view of Fabrègues

- Coat of arms
- Location of Fabrègues
- Location within France Location within Occitanie
- Coordinates: 43°33′05″N 3°46′37″E
- Country: France
- Region: Occitania
- Department: Hérault
- Arrondissement: Montpellier
- Canton: Pignan
- Intercommunality: Montpellier Méditerranée Métropole

Government
  - Mayor (2020–2026): Jacques Martinier
- Area^{1}: 31.46 km^{2} (12.15 sq mi)
- Highest elevation: 224 m (735 ft)
- Lowest elevation: 10 m (33 ft)
- Population (2023): 7,447
  - Density: 236.7/km^{2} (613.1/sq mi)
- Time zone: UTC+01:00 (CET)
  - Summer (DST): UTC+02:00 (CEST)
- INSEE/Postal code: 34095 /34690
- ^{1} French Land Register data, which excludes lakes, ponds, glaciers > 1 km^{2} (0.386 sq mi or 247 acres) and river estuaries.

Fabrègues (French pronunciation: [fabʁɛɡ]; Occitan: Fabregas) is a commune in the Hérault department in southern France.

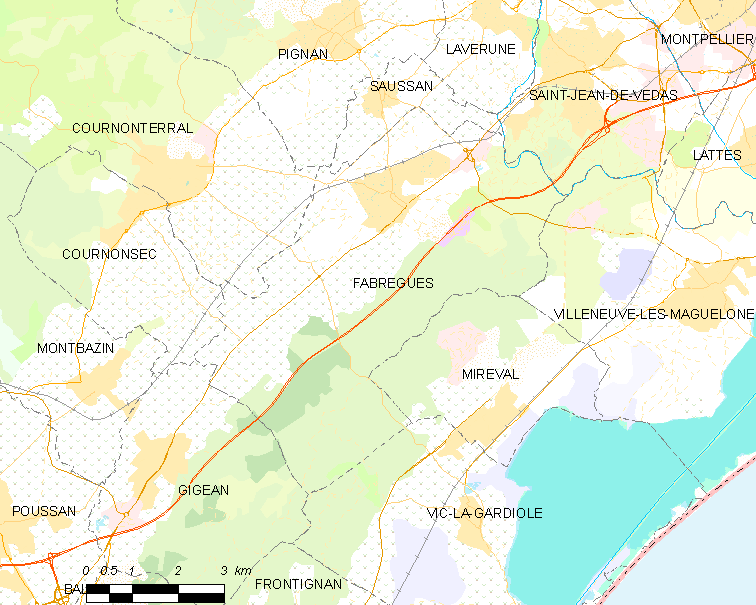
Map

== Population ==
Historical population
Year	Pop.	±% p.a.
1968	1,771	—
1975	2,522	+5.18%
1982	2,915	+2.09%
1990	4,089	+4.32%
1999	5,901	+4.16%
2007	6,180	+0.58%
2012	6,290	+0.35%
2017	7,035	+2.26%
2023	7,447	+0.95%
Source: INSEE

== See also ==
- Communes of the Hérault department
