= Pérols =

- Commune
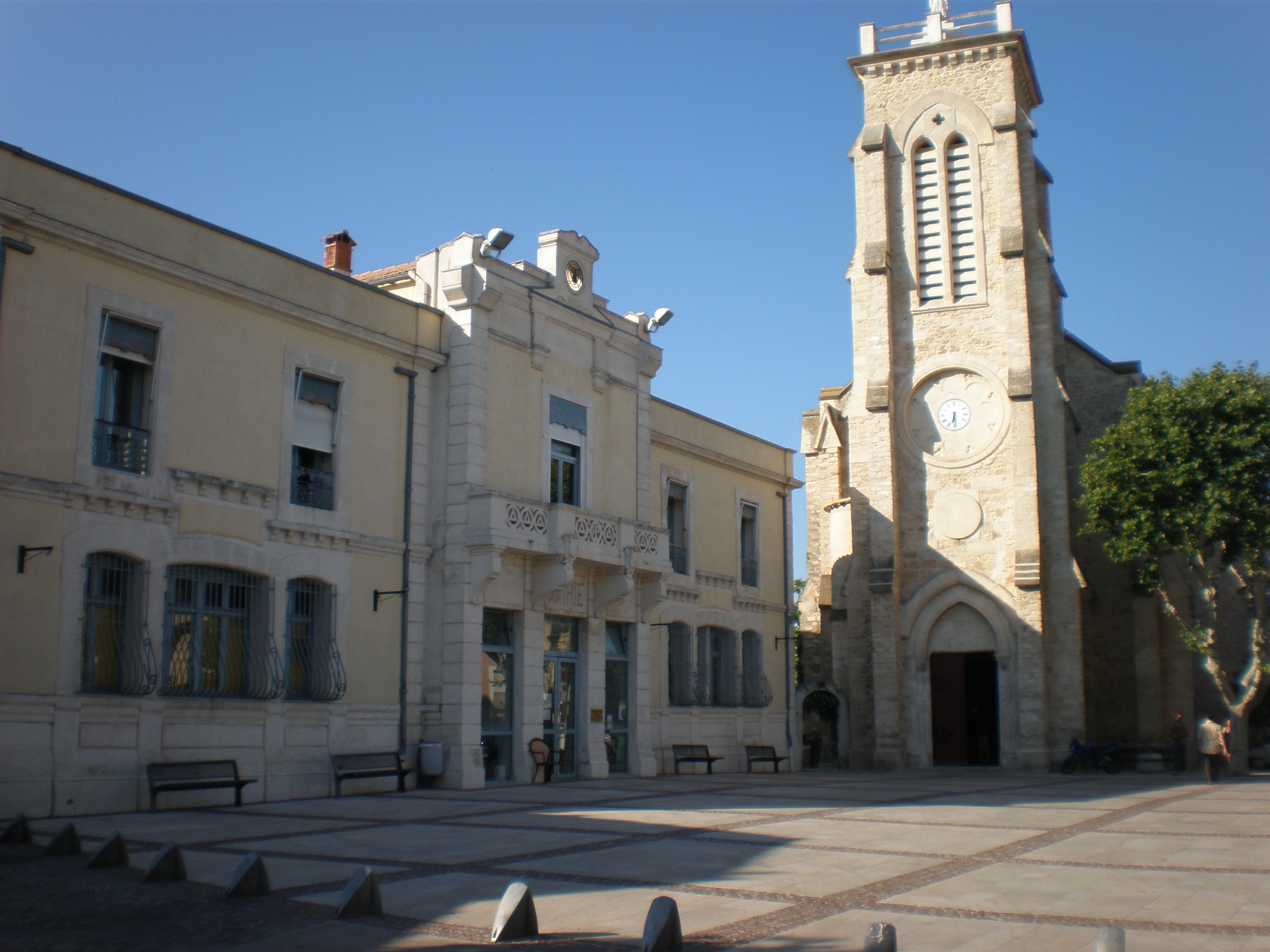
- The church of the Transfiguration-du-Seigneur and Saint-Sixte II

- Coat of arms
- Location of Pérols
- Location within France Location within Occitanie
- Coordinates: 43°33′57″N 3°57′04″E
- Country: France
- Region: Occitania
- Department: Hérault
- Arrondissement: Montpellier
- Canton: Lattes
- Intercommunality: Montpellier Méditerranée Métropole

Government
  - Mayor (2020–2026): Jean-Pierre Rico
- Area^{1}: 6.01 km^{2} (2.32 sq mi)
- Elevation: 10 m (33 ft)
- Highest elevation: 12 m (39 ft)
- Lowest elevation: 0 m (0 ft)
- Population (2023): 9,615
  - Density: 1,600/km^{2} (4,140/sq mi)
- Time zone: UTC+01:00 (CET)
  - Summer (DST): UTC+02:00 (CEST)
- INSEE/Postal code: 34198 /34470
- ^{1} French Land Register data, which excludes lakes, ponds, glaciers > 1 km^{2} (0.386 sq mi or 247 acres) and river estuaries.

Pérols (French pronunciation: [peʁɔl]; Occitan: Peròus) is a commune in the Hérault department in the Occitanie region in southern France. Close to the city of Montpellier, it is mostly a quiet village with beautiful old buildings.

== Population ==
Historical population
Year	Pop.	±% p.a.
1968	2,203	—
1975	3,440	+6.57%
1982	4,422	+3.65%
1990	6,595	+5.12%
1999	7,731	+1.78%
2007	8,515	+1.21%
2012	8,788	+0.63%
2017	8,985	+0.44%
2023	9,615	+1.14%
Source: INSEE

== See also ==
- Communes of the Hérault department
