= Saint-Georges-d'Orques =

- Commune
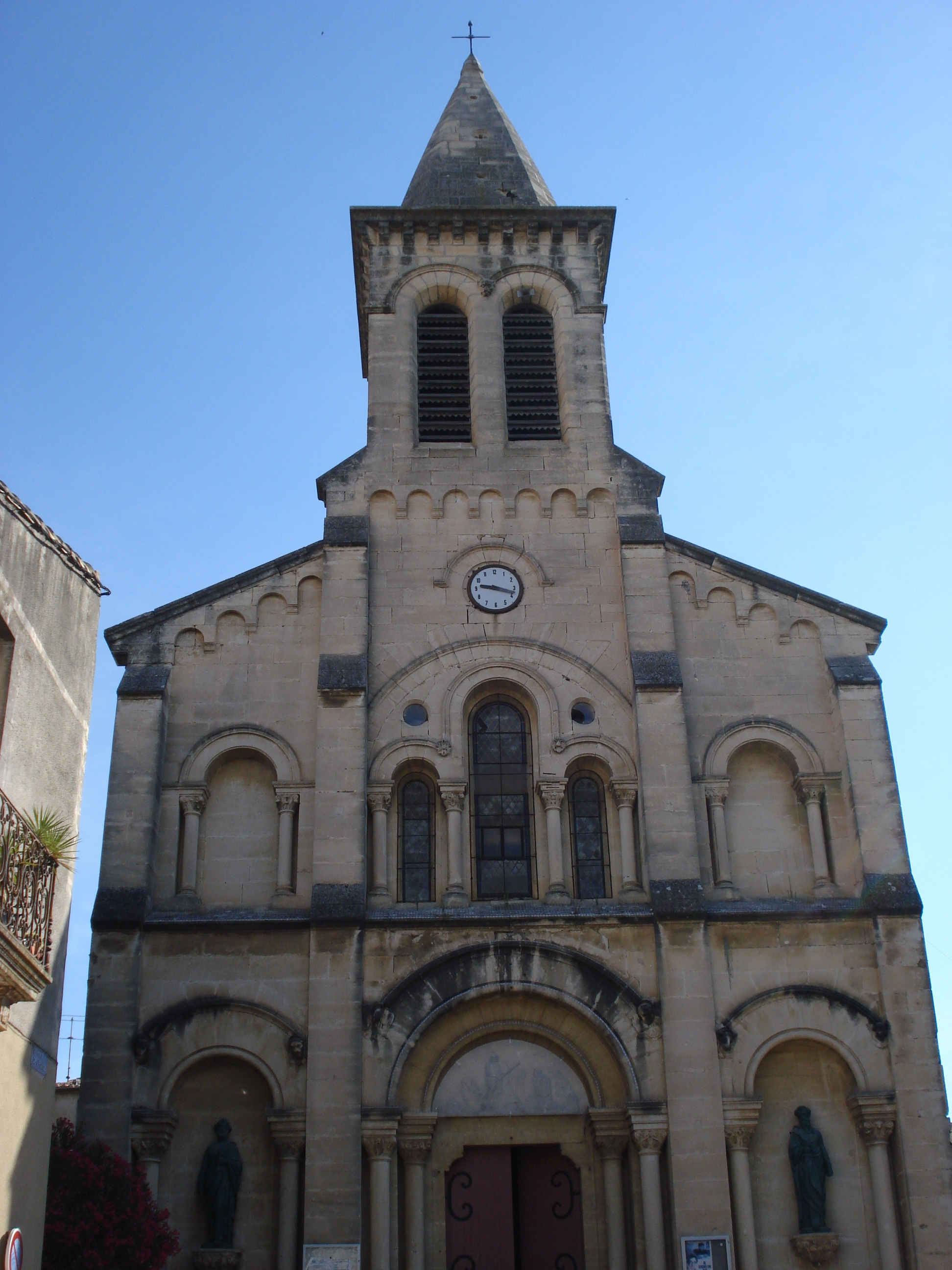
- The church of Saint-Georges-d'Orques
- Location of Saint-Georges-d'Orques
- Location within France Location within Occitanie
- Coordinates: 43°36′41″N 3°46′53″E
- Country: France
- Region: Occitania
- Department: Hérault
- Arrondissement: Montpellier
- Canton: Pignan
- Intercommunality: Montpellier Méditerranée Métropole

Government
  - Mayor (2020–2026): Jean-François Audrin
- Area^{1}: 9.31 km^{2} (3.59 sq mi)
- Elevation: 89 m (292 ft)
- Highest elevation: 183 m (600 ft)
- Lowest elevation: 45 m (148 ft)
- Population (2023): 5,676
  - Density: 610/km^{2} (1,580/sq mi)
- Time zone: UTC+01:00 (CET)
  - Summer (DST): UTC+02:00 (CEST)
- INSEE/Postal code: 34259 /34680
- ^{1} French Land Register data, which excludes lakes, ponds, glaciers > 1 km^{2} (0.386 sq mi or 247 acres) and river estuaries.

Saint-Georges-d'Orques (French pronunciation: [sɛ̃ ʒɔʁʒ dɔʁk]; Occitan: Sant Jòrdi d'Òrcas) is a commune in the Hérault department in the Occitanie region in southern France.

== Population ==
Historical population
Year	Pop.	±% p.a.
1968	1,091	—
1975	1,757	+7.04%
1982	2,727	+6.48%
1990	3,567	+3.41%
1999	4,398	+2.35%
2007	5,082	+1.82%
2012	5,022	−0.24%
2017	5,397	+1.45%
2023	5,676	+0.84%
Source: INSEE

== See also ==
- Communes of the Hérault department
