= Lavérune =

- Commune
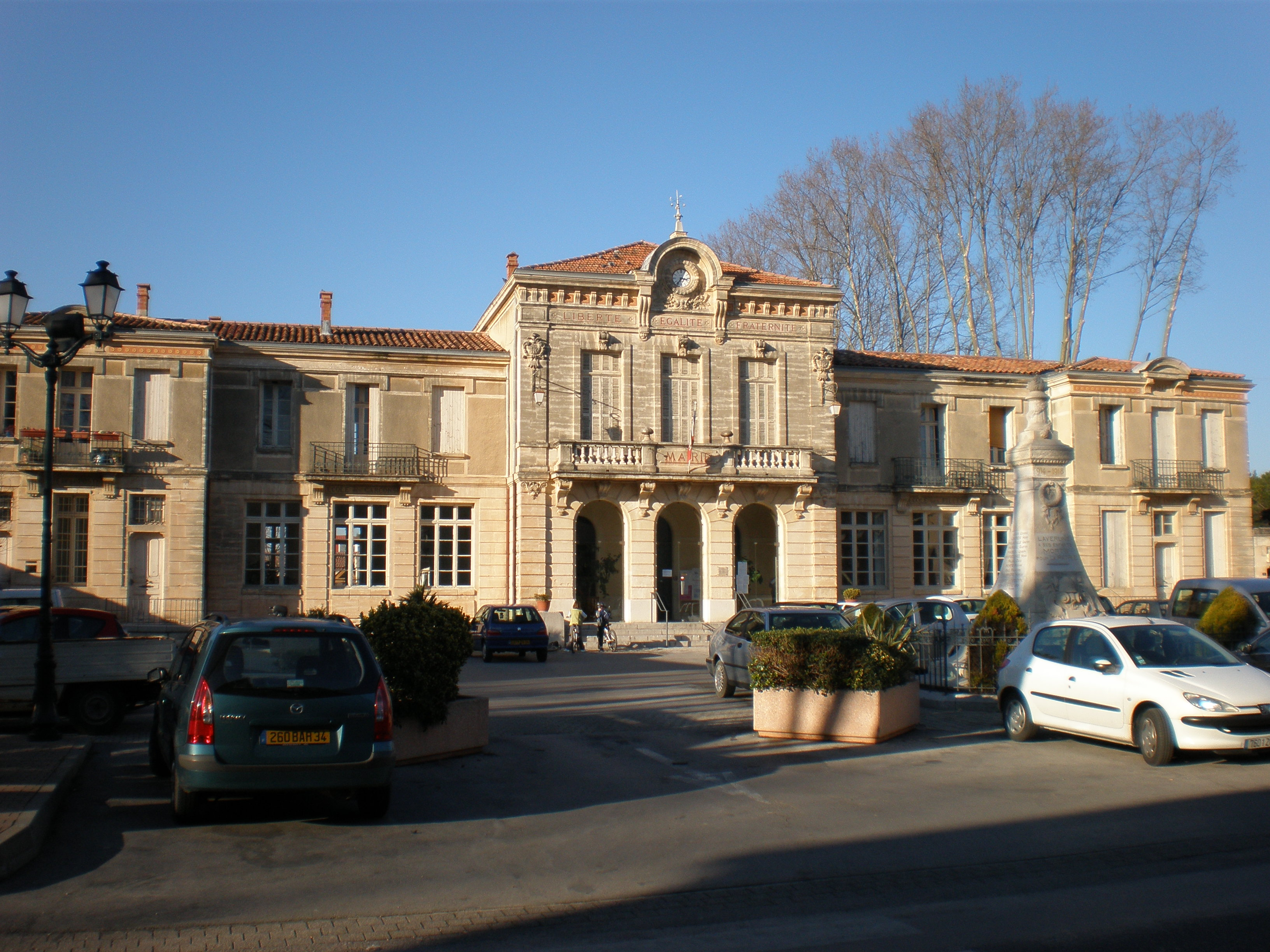
- Town hall

- Coat of arms
- Location of Lavérune
- Location within France Location within Occitanie
- Coordinates: 43°35′11″N 3°48′22″E
- Country: France
- Region: Occitania
- Department: Hérault
- Arrondissement: Montpellier
- Canton: Lattes
- Intercommunality: Montpellier Méditerranée Métropole

Government
  - Mayor (2020–2026): Roger Caizergues
- Area^{1}: 7.18 km^{2} (2.77 sq mi)
- Elevation: 30 m (98 ft)
- Highest elevation: 72 m (236 ft)
- Lowest elevation: 17 m (56 ft)
- Population (2023): 3,302
  - Density: 460/km^{2} (1,190/sq mi)
- Time zone: UTC+01:00 (CET)
  - Summer (DST): UTC+02:00 (CEST)
- INSEE/Postal code: 34134 /34880
- ^{1} French Land Register data, which excludes lakes, ponds, glaciers > 1 km^{2} (0.386 sq mi or 247 acres) and river estuaries.

Lavérune (French pronunciation: [laveʁyn]; Occitan: La Veiruna) is a commune in the Hérault département in the Occitanie region in southern France.

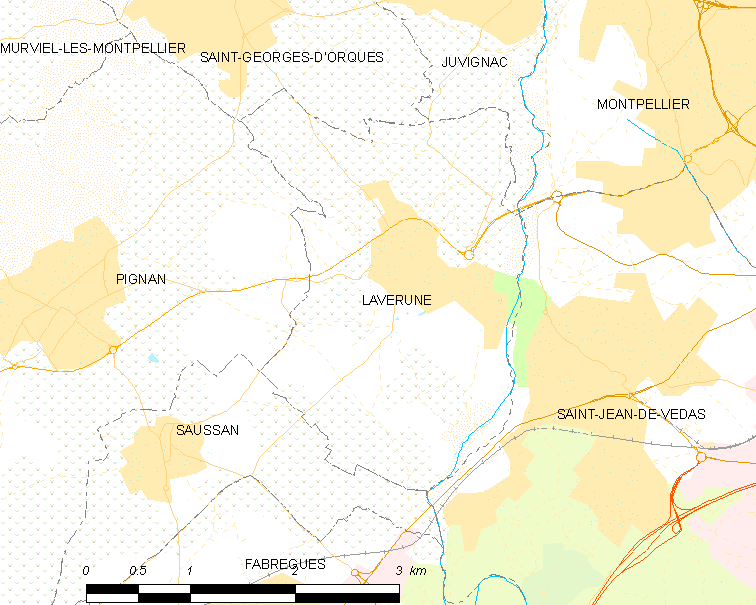
Map

== Population ==
Historical population
Year	Pop.	±% p.a.
1968	954	—
1975	1,254	+3.98%
1982	1,752	+4.89%
1990	2,090	+2.23%
1999	2,603	+2.47%
2007	2,708	+0.50%
2012	2,766	+0.42%
2017	3,237	+3.19%
2023	3,302	+0.33%
Source: INSEE

== Sport ==
Palla Tamburello: the main team is the Tambourin Club Laverune.

== See also ==
- Communes of the Hérault department
