= Jacou =

- Commune
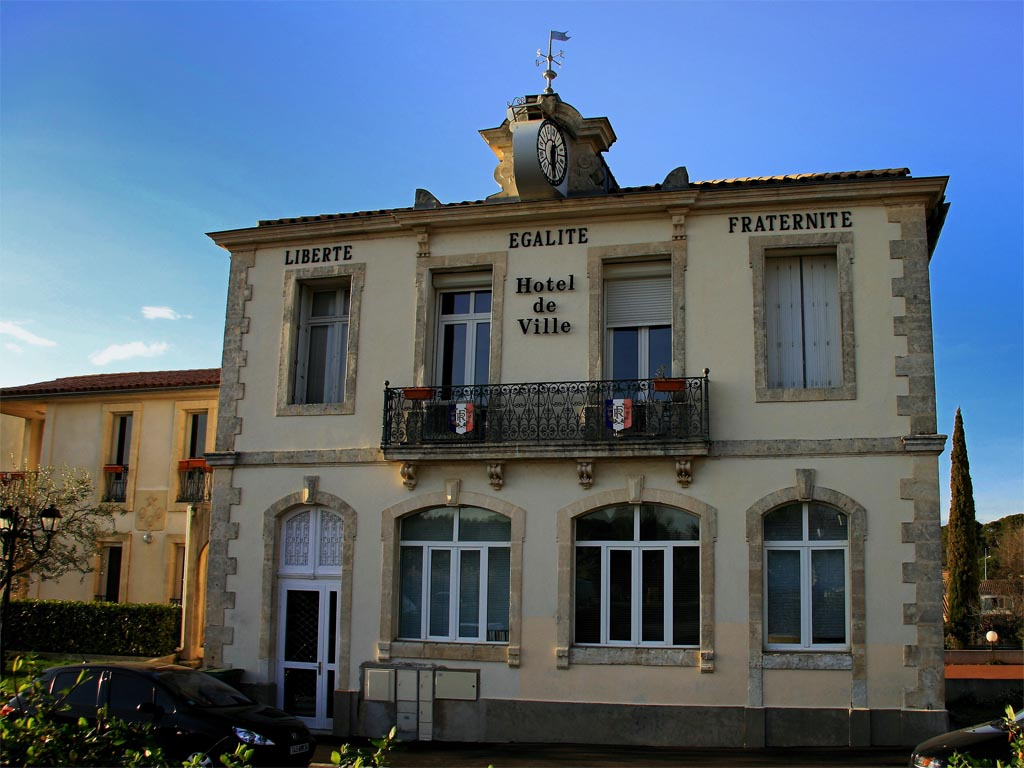
- Town hall

- Coat of arms
- Location of Jacou
- Location within France Location within Occitanie
- Coordinates: 43°39′41″N 3°54′44″E
- Country: France
- Region: Occitania
- Department: Hérault
- Arrondissement: Montpellier
- Canton: Montpellier - Castelnau-le-Lez
- Intercommunality: Montpellier Méditerranée Métropole

Government
  - Mayor (2020–2026): Renaud Calvat
- Area^{1}: 3.43 km^{2} (1.32 sq mi)
- Elevation: 68 m (223 ft)
- Highest elevation: 85 m (279 ft)
- Lowest elevation: 45 m (148 ft)
- Population (2023): 6,924
  - Density: 2,020/km^{2} (5,230/sq mi)
- Time zone: UTC+01:00 (CET)
  - Summer (DST): UTC+02:00 (CEST)
- INSEE/Postal code: 34120 /34830
- ^{1} French Land Register data, which excludes lakes, ponds, glaciers > 1 km^{2} (0.386 sq mi or 247 acres) and river estuaries.

Jacou (French pronunciation: [ʒaku]; Occitan: Jacon) is a commune in the Hérault département in the Occitanie region in southern France. Located on the outskirts of Montpellier, it is situated around 7 km (4.3 mi) north of the Montpellier city centre.

== Geography ==
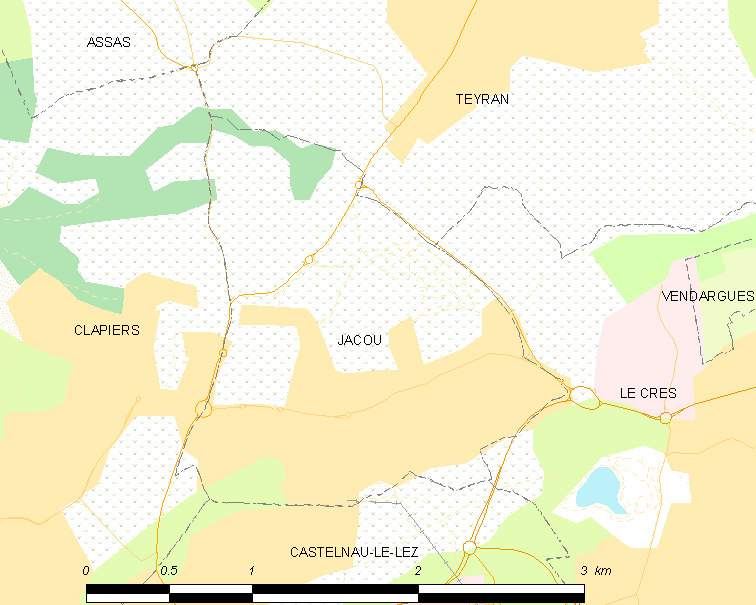
Map

The commune borders Clapiers to the west, Castelnau-le-Lez to the south, Le Crès to the east, and Teyran to the north.

=== Climate ===
In 2010, the climate of the commune is classified as a frank Mediterranean climate, according to a study based on a dataset covering the 1971-2000 period. In 2020, Météo-France published a typology of climates in mainland France in which the commune is exposed to a Mediterranean climate and is part of the Provence, Languedoc-Roussillon climatic region, characterized by low rainfall in summer, very good sunshine (2,600 h/year), a hot summer 21.5 °C (71 °F), very dry air in summer, dry conditions in all seasons, strong winds (with a frequency of 40 to 50% for winds > 5 m/s), and little fog.

For the 1971-2000 period, the average annual temperature was 14.2 °C (58 °F) with an annual atmospheric temperature of 16.6 °C (62 °F). The average annual total rainfall during this period was 746 mm, with 6 days of precipitation in January and 2.8 days in July. For the subsequent period of 1991 to 2020, the average annual temperature observed at the nearest weather station, located in the commune of Prades-le-Lez, 6 kilometres (4 mi) away as the crow flies, is 14.6 °C (58 °F), and the average annual total rainfall is 869.7 mm.

For the future, climate parameters for the commune projected for 2050, based on different greenhouse gas emission scenarios, can be consulted on a dedicated website published by Météo-France in November 2022.

== Population ==
Historical population

Year	Pop.	±% p.a.
1793	81	—
1800	61	−3.97%
1806	92	+7.09%
1821	85	−0.53%
1831	88	+0.35%
1836	90	+0.45%
1841	117	+5.39%
1846	111	−1.05%
1851	145	+5.49%
1856	139	−0.84%
1861	132	−1.03%
1866	145	+1.90%
1872	153	+0.90%
1876	141	−2.02%
1881	134	−1.01%
1886	120	−2.18%
1891	125	+0.82%
1896	124	−0.16%
1901	160	+5.23%

Year	Pop.	±% p.a.
1906	164	+0.50%
1911	152	−1.51%
1921	175	+1.42%
1926	159	−1.90%
1931	179	+2.40%
1936	160	−2.22%
1946	209	+2.71%
1954	241	+1.80%
1962	223	−0.97%
1968	247	+1.72%
1975	1,259	+26.20%
1982	1,774	+5.02%
1990	3,795	+9.97%
1999	4,757	+2.54%
2007	4,939	+0.47%
2012	5,658	+2.76%
2017	6,791	+3.72%
2023	6,924	+0.32%

Source: Ldh/EHESS/Cassini until 1999, and INSEE since 2007.

== See also ==
- Communes of the Hérault department
