= Departmental Council of Hérault =

Departmental legislature in France

Departmental Council of Hérault Conseil départemental de l'Hérault

Leadership
- President: Kléber Mesquida, PS since 2 April 2015

Structure
- Seats: 50
- Political groups: Government (38): PS (24); DVG (7); LÉ (3); PCF (3); DVC (1); Opposition (12): DVD (6); LR (3); RN (2); UDI (1); herault.fr

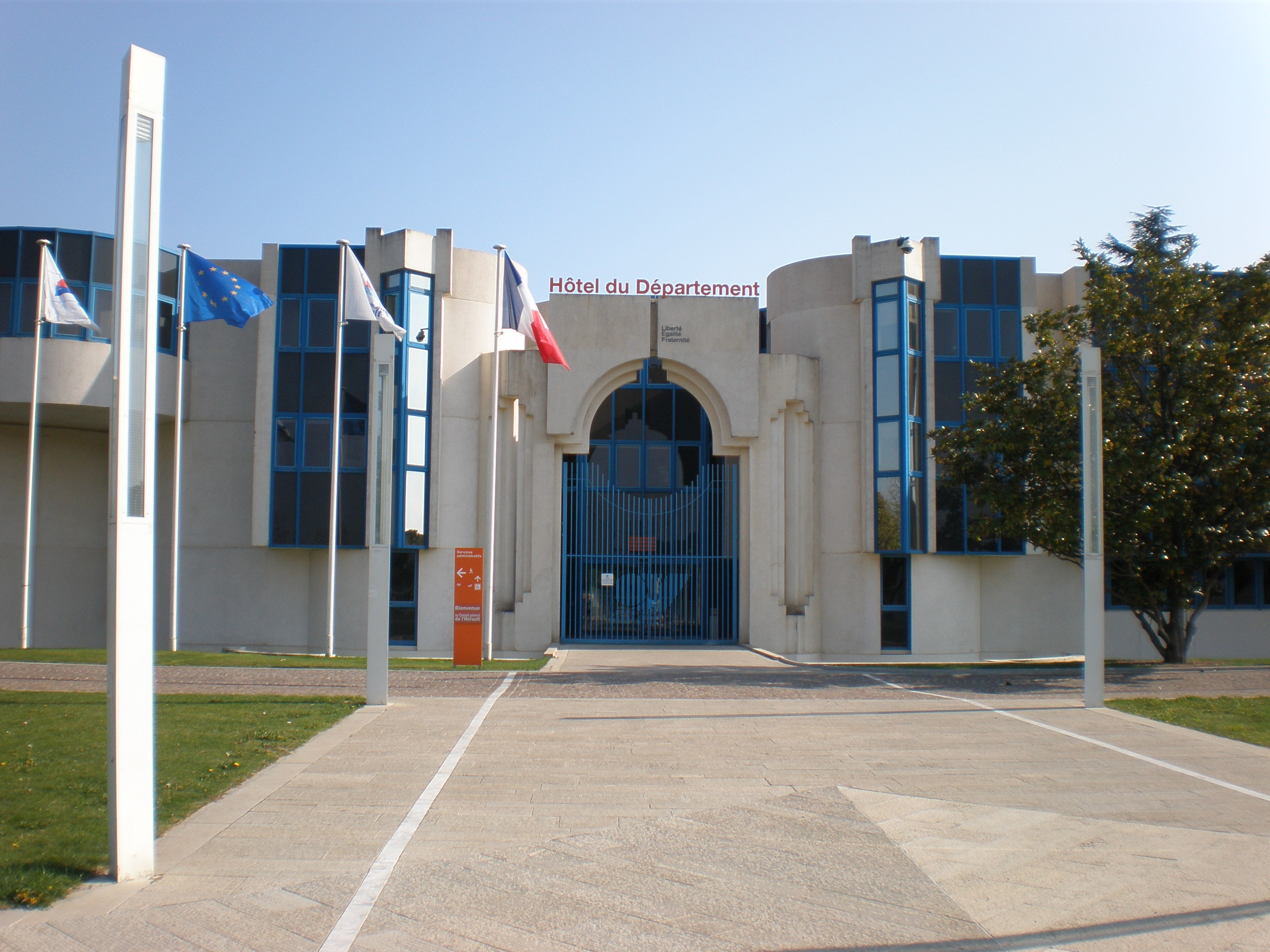
Headquarters of the council

The Departmental Council of Hérault (French: Conseil départemental de l'Hérault, Occitan: Conselh departamental d'Erau) is the deliberative assembly of the Hérault department in the region of Occitanie. It consists of 50 members (general councilors) from 25 cantons and its headquarters are in Montpellier.

The President of the General Council is Kléber Mesquida.

== Vice-presidents ==
The president of the Departmental Council is assisted by 15 vice-presidents chosen from among the departmental advisers. Each of them has a delegation of authority.

List of vice-presidents of the Hérault Departmental Council (as of 2021)
Order	Name	Party	Canton (constituency)	Delegation
1st	Pierre Bouldoire	PS	Frontignan	Territorial solidarities - digital transition and innovation
2nd	Claudine Vassas-Mejri	PS	Le Crès	Integration and solidarity economy
3rd	Philippe Vidal	PS	Cazouls-les-Béziers	Regional planning
4th	Patricia Weber	DVG	Lattes	Solidarity with people and autonomy
5th	Christophe Morgo	PS	Mèze	Environment
6th	Marie-Pierre Pons	PS	Saint-Pons-de-Thomières	Culture
7th	Vincent Gaudy	PS	Pézénas	Social housing and land policy
8th	Gabrielle Henry	PS	Montpellier-2	External relations
9th	Yvon Pellet	PS	Le Crès	Agricultural economy and rural development
10th	Nicole Morere	DVG	Gignac	General administration and resources
11th	Jean-Louis Gely	PS	Montpellier-2	Tourism and the Economy
12th	Marie Passieux	PS	Clermont-l'Hérault	Sports and recreation
13th	Jacques Rigaud	PS	Lodève	Departmental heritage and operational resources
14th	Véronique Calueba	PCF	Sète	Childhood and family solidarity
15th	Renaud Calvat	UGE	Montpellier-Castelnau-le-Lez	Education and Colleges
