= Madeleine Attal =

French actress and theatre director (1921–2023)

- Born: 11 December 1921; French Algeria
- Died: 13 January 2023 (aged 101); Montaud, Hérault, France
- Occupations: Actress; Theatre director

Madeleine Attal, also known as Madeleine Attal-Charvet, (11 December 1921 – 13 January 2023) was a French actress and theatre director.

== Biography ==
Attal began her acting career in 1945 with the Compagnie du Peyrou, before heading a drama troupe at a Montpellier radio station, where she worked as a continuity announcer and a theatre and film director. At the theatre, she staged a number of plays, such as La Pastorale des voleurs by Max Roqueta in 1960 at the Festival de Carcassonne, as well as Gaslight by Patrick Hamilton at the Salle Molière in Montpellier in 1963. She was director of Radio-France-Hérault from 1983 to 1984. She was also programming director of France 3 Sud.

Madeleine Attal died in Montaud, Hérault on 13 January 2023 at the age of 101.

== Honours ==
- Honorary citizen of Montaud, Hérault
