= Hôtel de Ville, Castelnau-le-Lez =

Town hall in Castelnau-le-Lez, France

Hôtel de Ville
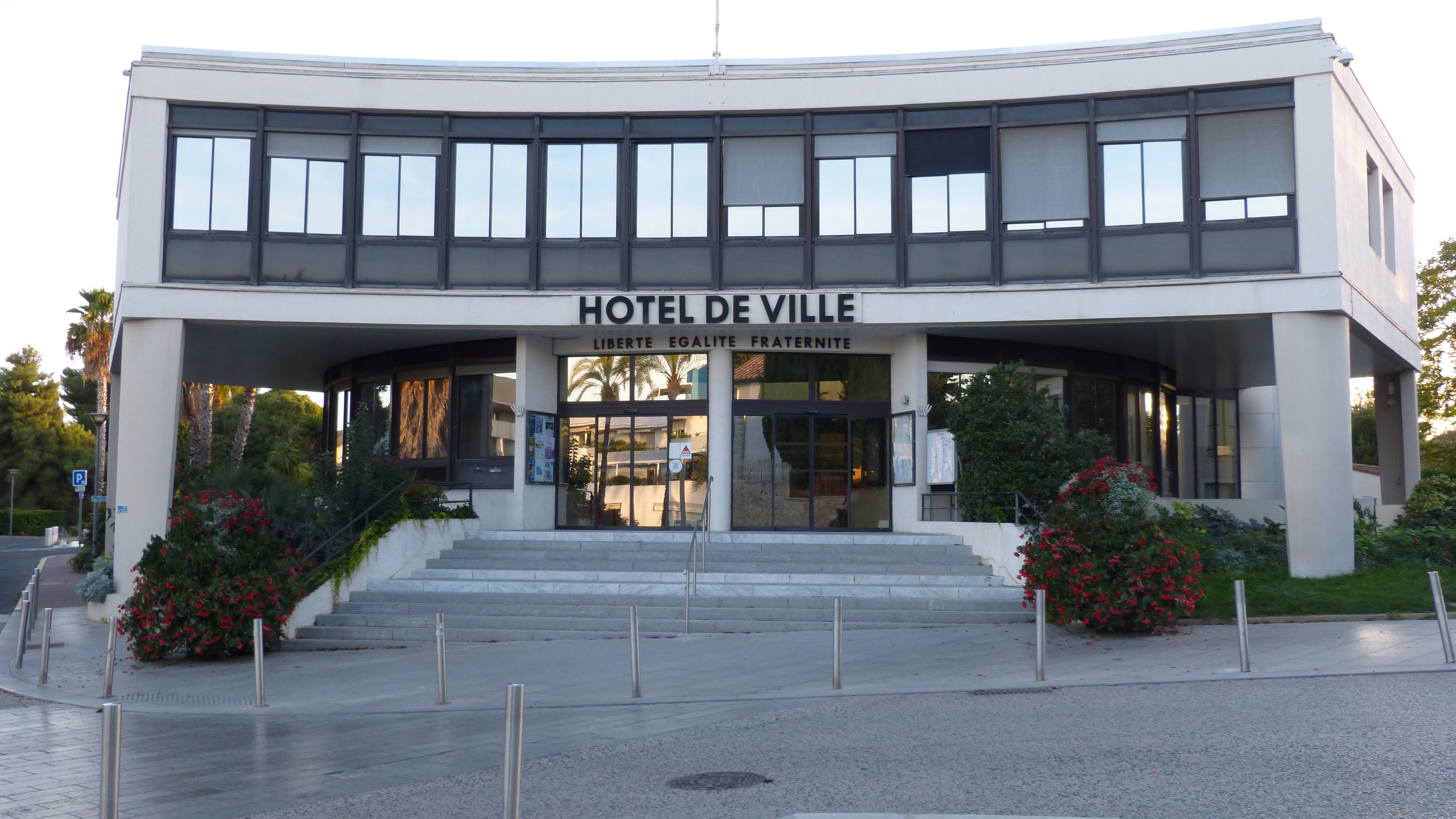
- The main frontage of the Hôtel de Ville in October 2023
- Interactive map of the Hôtel de Ville area

General information
- Type: City hall
- Architectural style: Modern style
- Location: Castelnau-le-Lez, France
- Coordinates: 43.6327°N 3.8975°E
- Completed: 1972

Design and construction
- Architect: Henri Puech

The Hôtel de Ville (French pronunciation: [otɛl də vil], City Hall) is a municipal building in Castelnau-le-Lez, Hérault, in southern France, standing on Rue de la Crouzette.

== History ==
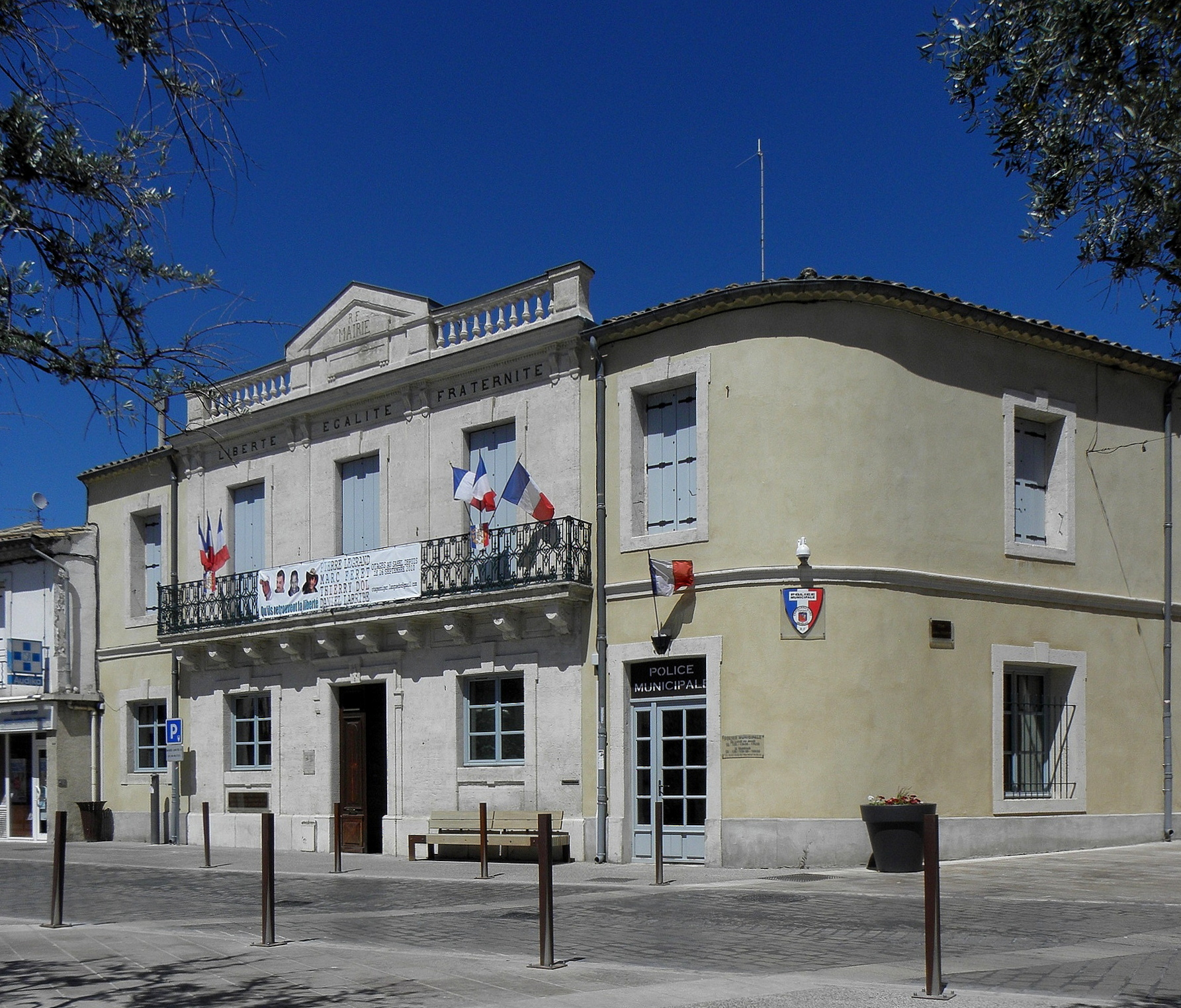
The old town hall

Following the French Revolution the town council initially met at the home of the mayor at the time. This arrangement continued until the mid-18th century, when the council led by the mayor, Jean Berger, decided to establish a combined town hall and school. The building they selected, on the east side of the town square (now Place de la Liberté), was known as Maison Grasset and had been the home of a lawyer, Joseph Bruno Grasset. The building had been designed in the neoclassical style, built in ashlar stone and dated back at least to the first half of the 19th century.

The design involved a symmetrical main frontage of five bays facing onto the street. The central section of three bays, which was slightly projected forward, featured a square headed doorway with a stone surround and a keystone flanked by a pair of square-shaped casement windows. The first floor was fenestrated by tall casement windows and fronted by an iron balcony: the outer bays were fenestrated in a similar style. At roof level, there was a pediment above the central bay and balustraded parapets above the bays on either side. The building was acquired by the council in February 1857.

A war memorial, intended to commemorate the lives of local service personnel who died in the First World War, was designed by the sculptor, Joseph Coste, and unveiled by the mayor, Édouard Pujol, in front of the town hall in 1924. It was then relocated to La Crouzette Cemetery in the 1960s.

After the building was no longer required for municipal use, it served a police station from 1984. It then became the Centre Régional d'Histoire de la Résistance et de la Déportation (Regional Centre for the History of the Resistance and Deportation) in 1990. The centre was renamed to commemorate the life of one of its founders, General Véran Cambon de Lavalette, in 2014. The building also accommodated the Espace Orientation Jeunesse (Youth Guidance Centre) until it relocated to Grand Parc Laporte and became the Point Information Jeunesse (Youth Information Point) in 2015.

In the late 1960s, following significant population growth, the council decided to commission a modern town hall. The site they selected was on the southwestern side of Rue de la Crouzette. The new building was designed by Henri Puech in the modern style, built in concrete and glass and was officially opened by the mayor, Jean Fournier, on 6 May 1972.

The new building was laid out in the shape of a truncated triangle with three concave sides. The ground floor was circular and, on the first floor, the corners of the triangle were jettied out over the pavement on columns. The design involved a curved main frontage of 12 bays facing the street. The first floor featured a flight of steps leading up to two glass doorways, while the first floor was fenestrated by a row of 12 dark-framed windows with concrete entablatures below and above. Internally, the principal rooms were the Bureau du Maire (mayor's parlour) and the Salle du Conseil (council chamber) on the first floor. An extensive programme of works to refurbish the reception area on the ground floor of the building was undertaken between June 2024 and September 2024.
