= Saint-Drézéry =

Commune in France

- Commune
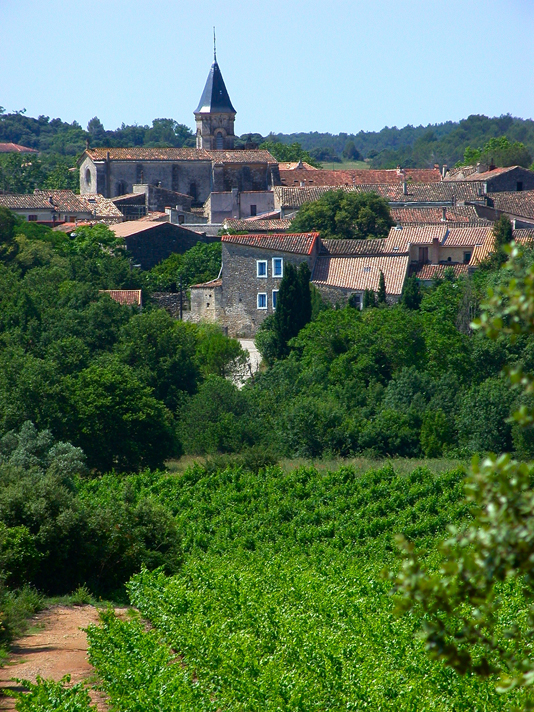
- A general view of Saint-Drézéry

- Coat of arms
- Location of Saint-Drézéry
- Location within France Location within Occitanie
- Coordinates: 43°44′03″N 3°58′58″E
- Country: France
- Region: Occitania
- Department: Hérault
- Arrondissement: Montpellier
- Canton: Le Crès
- Intercommunality: Montpellier Méditerranée Métropole

Government
  - Mayor (2020–2026): Jackie Galabrun-Boulbes
- Area^{1}: 10.47 km^{2} (4.04 sq mi)
- Elevation: 86 m (282 ft)
- Highest elevation: 145 m (476 ft)
- Lowest elevation: 60 m (200 ft)
- Population (2023): 3,006
  - Density: 287.1/km^{2} (743.6/sq mi)
- Time zone: UTC+01:00 (CET)
  - Summer (DST): UTC+02:00 (CEST)
- INSEE/Postal code: 34249 /34160
- ^{1} French Land Register data, which excludes lakes, ponds, glaciers > 1 km^{2} (0.386 sq mi or 247 acres) and river estuaries.

Saint-Drézéry (French pronunciation: [sɛ̃ dʁezeʁi]; Occitan: Sant Dreseri) is a commune in the Hérault department in the Occitanie region in southern France.

== Climate ==
Saint-Drézéry has a mediterranean climate (Köppen climate classification Csa). The average annual temperature in Saint-Drézéry is 14.3 °C (57.7 °F). The average annual rainfall is 768.4 mm (30.25 in) with October as the wettest month. The temperatures are highest on average in July, at around 23.7 °C (74.7 °F), and lowest in January, at around 6.3 °C (43.3 °F). The highest temperature ever recorded in Saint-Drézéry was 43.9 °C (111.0 °F) on 28 June 2019; the coldest temperature ever recorded was −12.6 °C (9.3 °F) on 9 January 1985.

Climate data for Saint-Drézéry (1981–2010 averages, extremes 1980−2019)
Month	Jan	Feb	Mar	Apr	May	Jun	Jul	Aug	Sep	Oct	Nov	Dec	Year
Record high °C (°F)	22.0 (71.6)	23.4 (74.1)	28.5 (83.3)	30.0 (86.0)	36.0 (96.8)	43.9 (111.0)	39.5 (103.1)	40.0 (104.0)	36.0 (96.8)	31.5 (88.7)	23.2 (73.8)	20.5 (68.9)	43.9 (111.0)
Mean daily maximum °C (°F)	10.8 (51.4)	12.1 (53.8)	15.8 (60.4)	18.3 (64.9)	22.4 (72.3)	27.3 (81.1)	30.8 (87.4)	30.1 (86.2)	25.3 (77.5)	19.9 (67.8)	14.2 (57.6)	11.1 (52.0)	19.9 (67.8)
Daily mean °C (°F)	6.3 (43.3)	6.9 (44.4)	10.1 (50.2)	12.7 (54.9)	16.6 (61.9)	20.7 (69.3)	23.7 (74.7)	23.3 (73.9)	19.2 (66.6)	15.1 (59.2)	9.7 (49.5)	6.8 (44.2)	14.3 (57.7)
Mean daily minimum °C (°F)	1.7 (35.1)	1.7 (35.1)	4.4 (39.9)	7.0 (44.6)	10.8 (51.4)	14.2 (57.6)	16.7 (62.1)	16.5 (61.7)	13.0 (55.4)	10.3 (50.5)	5.3 (41.5)	2.5 (36.5)	8.7 (47.7)
Record low °C (°F)	−12.6 (9.3)	−10.2 (13.6)	−10.0 (14.0)	−3.0 (26.6)	2.5 (36.5)	6.0 (42.8)	9.0 (48.2)	8.5 (47.3)	4.2 (39.6)	−2.0 (28.4)	−8.0 (17.6)	−11.0 (12.2)	−12.6 (9.3)
Average precipitation mm (inches)	62.2 (2.45)	57.1 (2.25)	39.9 (1.57)	64.3 (2.53)	54.6 (2.15)	34.5 (1.36)	20.2 (0.80)	39.1 (1.54)	108.8 (4.28)	119.7 (4.71)	85.8 (3.38)	82.2 (3.24)	768.4 (30.25)
Average precipitation days (≥ 1.0 mm)	6.1	5.0	4.7	6.3	5.7	4.3	2.3	3.7	5.0	7.0	6.7	6.0	62.6
Source: Meteociel

== Population ==
Historical population
Year	Pop.	±% p.a.
1968	555	—
1975	574	+0.48%
1982	1,017	+8.51%
1990	1,329	+3.40%
1999	1,754	+3.13%
2007	2,098	+2.26%
2012	2,246	+1.37%
2017	2,526	+2.38%
2023	3,006	+2.94%
Source: INSEE

== See also ==
- Communes of the Hérault department
