= Restinclières =

- Commune
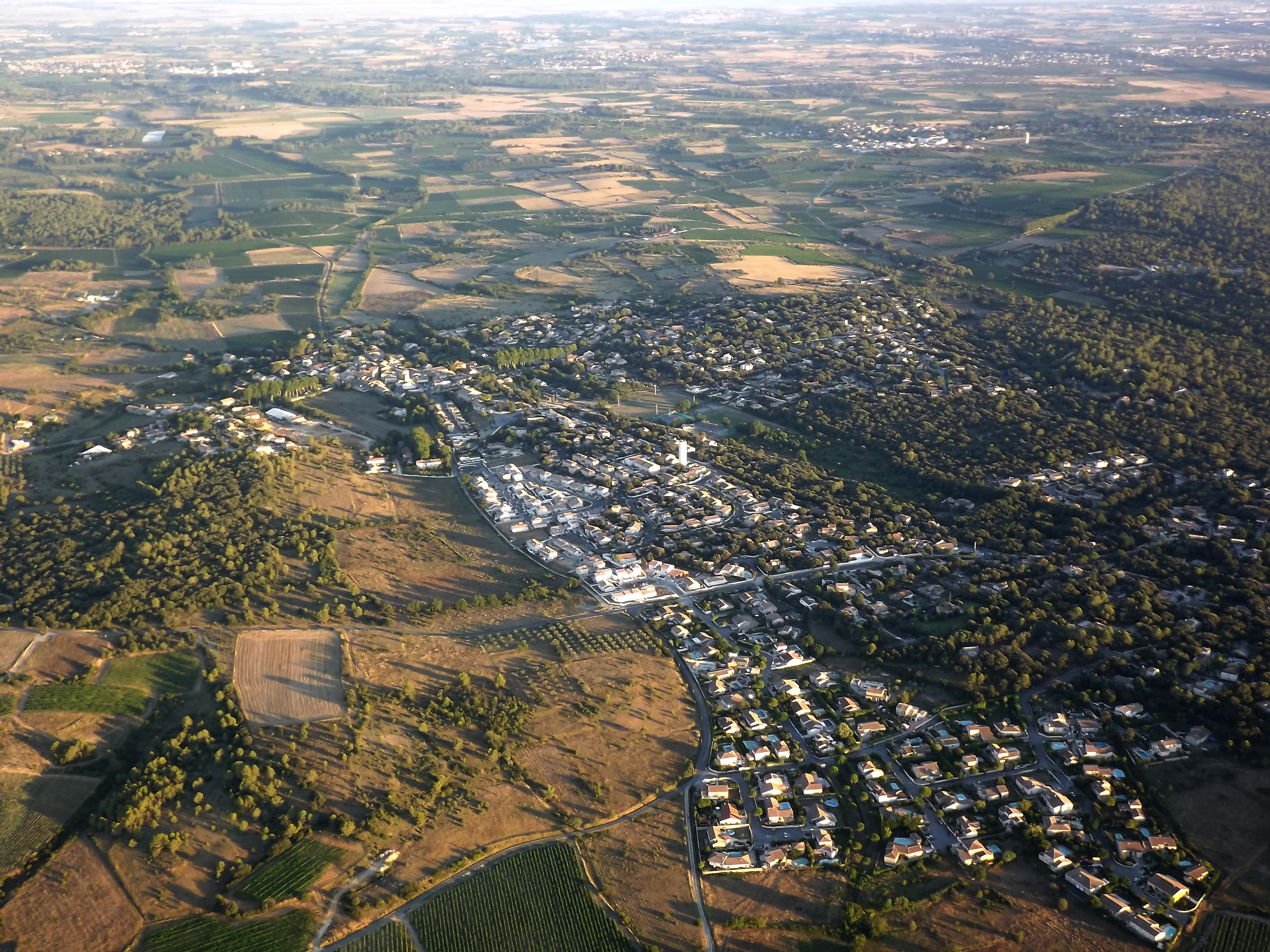
- An aerial view of Restinclières

- Coat of arms
- Location of Restinclières
- Location within France Location within Occitanie
- Coordinates: 43°43′28″N 4°02′23″E
- Country: France
- Region: Occitania
- Department: Hérault
- Arrondissement: Montpellier
- Canton: Le Crès
- Intercommunality: Montpellier Méditerranée Métropole

Government
  - Mayor (2020–2026): Geniès Balazun
- Area^{1}: 6.53 km^{2} (2.52 sq mi)
- Elevation: 85 m (279 ft)
- Highest elevation: 101 m (331 ft)
- Lowest elevation: 47 m (154 ft)
- Population (2023): 2,612
  - Density: 400/km^{2} (1,040/sq mi)
- Time zone: UTC+01:00 (CET)
  - Summer (DST): UTC+02:00 (CEST)
- INSEE/Postal code: 34227 /34160
- ^{1} French Land Register data, which excludes lakes, ponds, glaciers > 1 km^{2} (0.386 sq mi or 247 acres) and river estuaries.

Restinclières (French pronunciation: [ʁɛstɛ̃klijɛʁ]; Occitan: Restinclièiras) is a commune in the Hérault department in the Occitanie region in southern France.

== Population ==
Historical population
Year	Pop.	±% p.a.
1968	211	—
1975	296	+4.95%
1982	587	+10.28%
1990	781	+3.63%
1999	1,162	+4.51%
2007	1,491	+3.17%
2012	1,599	+1.41%
2017	1,888	+3.38%
2023	2,612	+5.56%
Source: INSEE

== See also ==
- Communes of the Hérault department
