= Montpellier Méditerranée Métropole =

Coordinates: 43°37′N 3°52′E

- Métropole
- Location in the Hérault.
- Country: France
- Region: Occitania
- Department: Hérault
- No. of communes: {{{nbcomm}}}
- Established: January 2015

Government
  - President: Michaël Delafosse
- Area: 421.8 km^{2} (162.9 sq mi)
- Population (2018): 481,276
  - Density: 1,141/km^{2} (2,955/sq mi)
- Website: montpellier3m.fr

Montpellier Méditerranée Métropole (French pronunciation: [mɔ̃pəlje meditɛʁane metʁɔpɔl]) is the métropole, an intercommunal structure, centred on the city of Montpellier. It is located in the Hérault department, in the Occitanie region, southern France. It was created in January 2015, replacing the previous Communauté d'agglomération de Montpellier. Its area is 421.8 km^{2}. Its population was 481,276 in 2018, of which 290,053 in Montpellier proper.

== History ==
The district of Montpellier was created in 1965. In 2001, it became an agglomeration community (French: Communauté d'agglomération Montpellier Agglomération). On January 1, 2015, the Métropolitan community replaced the agglomeration community in accordance with a law of January 2014.

== Composition ==
Montpellier Méditerranée Métropole covers the following 31 communes. The communes with « ° » are the 15 members of the former district of Montpellier.

1. Baillargues°
2. Beaulieu
3. Castelnau-le-Lez°
4. Castries
5. Clapiers°
6. Cournonsec
7. Cournonterral
8. Le Crès°
9. Fabrègues
10. Grabels°
11. Jacou°
12. Juvignac°
13. Lattes°
14. Lavérune
15. Montaud
16. Montferrier-sur-Lez°
17. Montpellier°
18. Murviel-lès-Montpellier
19. Pérols°
20. Pignan
21. Prades-le-Lez°
22. Restinclières
23. Saint-Brès
24. Saint-Drézéry
25. Saint-Geniès-des-Mourgues
26. Saint-Georges-d'Orques
27. Saint-Jean-de-Védas°
28. Saussan
29. Sussargues
30. Vendargues°
31. Villeneuve-lès-Maguelone

Palavas-les-Flots left the Agglomeration community of Montpellier Agglomération on January 1, 2005. The commune was one of the initial member communes of the "district de Montpellier".

== See also ==
- Transports de l'agglomération de Montpellier
