= Sussargues =

- Commune
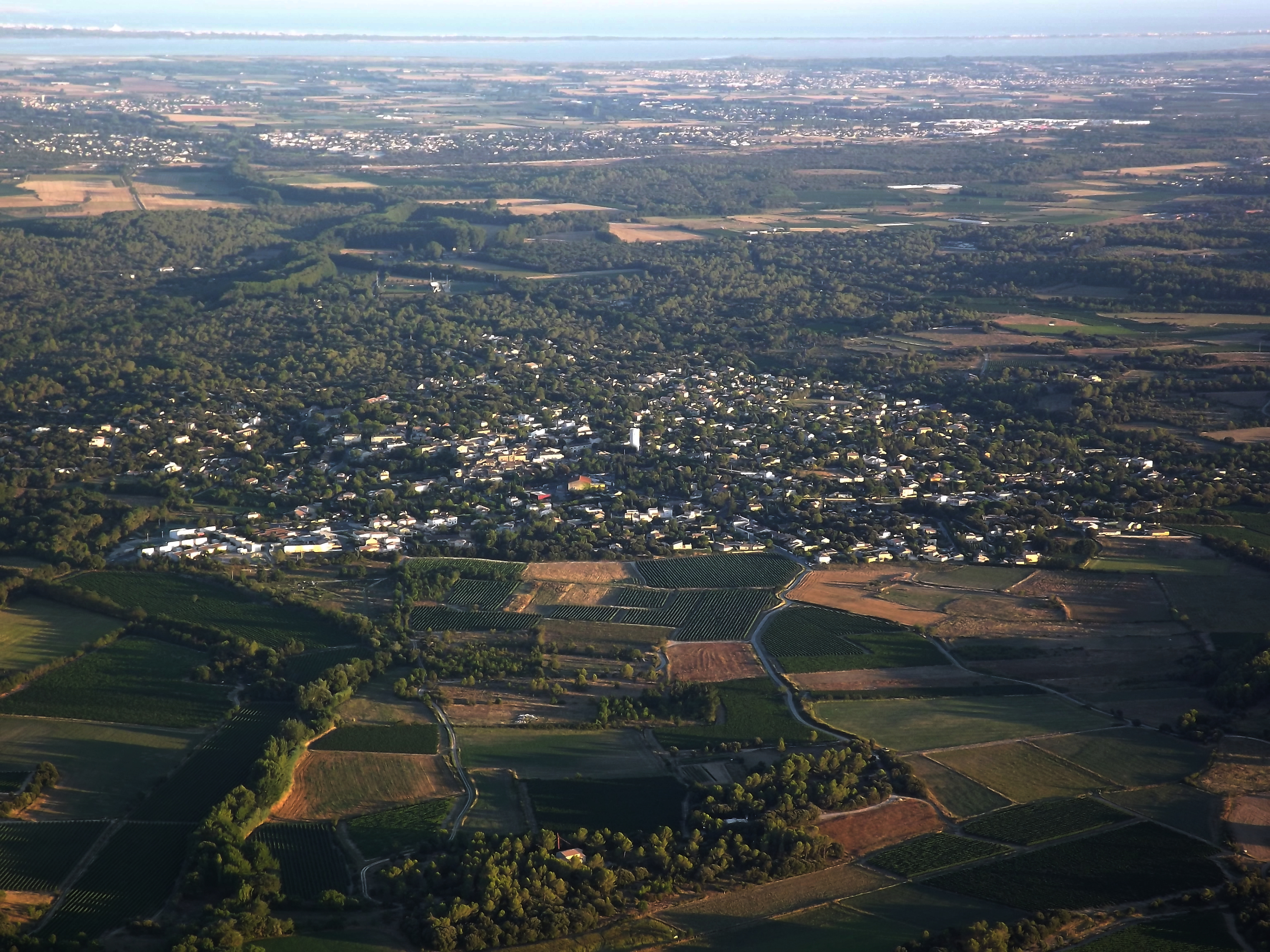
- An aerial view of Sussargues

- Coat of arms
- Location of Sussargues
- Location within France Location within Occitanie
- Coordinates: 43°42′45″N 4°00′11″E
- Country: France
- Region: Occitania
- Department: Hérault
- Arrondissement: Montpellier
- Canton: Le Crès
- Intercommunality: Montpellier Méditerranée Métropole

Government
  - Mayor (2020–2026): Eliane Lloret
- Area^{1}: 6.48 km^{2} (2.50 sq mi)
- Elevation: 75 m (246 ft)
- Highest elevation: 126 m (413 ft)
- Lowest elevation: 35 m (115 ft)
- Population (2023): 2,840
  - Density: 438/km^{2} (1,140/sq mi)
- Time zone: UTC+01:00 (CET)
  - Summer (DST): UTC+02:00 (CEST)
- INSEE/Postal code: 34307 /34160
- ^{1} French Land Register data, which excludes lakes, ponds, glaciers > 1 km^{2} (0.386 sq mi or 247 acres) and river estuaries.

Sussargues (French pronunciation: [sysaʁɡ]; Occitan: Suçargues) is a commune in the Hérault department in the Occitanie region in southern France.

== Population ==
Historical population

Year	Pop.	±% p.a.
1793	165	—
1821	148	−0.39%
1846	262	+2.31%
1872	323	+0.81%
1901	412	+0.84%
1926	338	−0.79%
1946	230	−1.91%
1962	254	+0.62%
1968	284	+1.88%

Year	Pop.	±% p.a.
1975	577	+10.66%
1982	1,060	+9.08%
1990	1,718	+6.22%
1999	2,125	+2.39%
2007	2,353	+1.28%
2012	2,605	+2.06%
2017	2,751	+1.10%
2023	2,840	+0.53%

Source: EHESS and INSEE (1968–2023)

== See also ==
- Communes of the Hérault department
