= Beaulieu, Hérault =

Beaulieu
- Commune
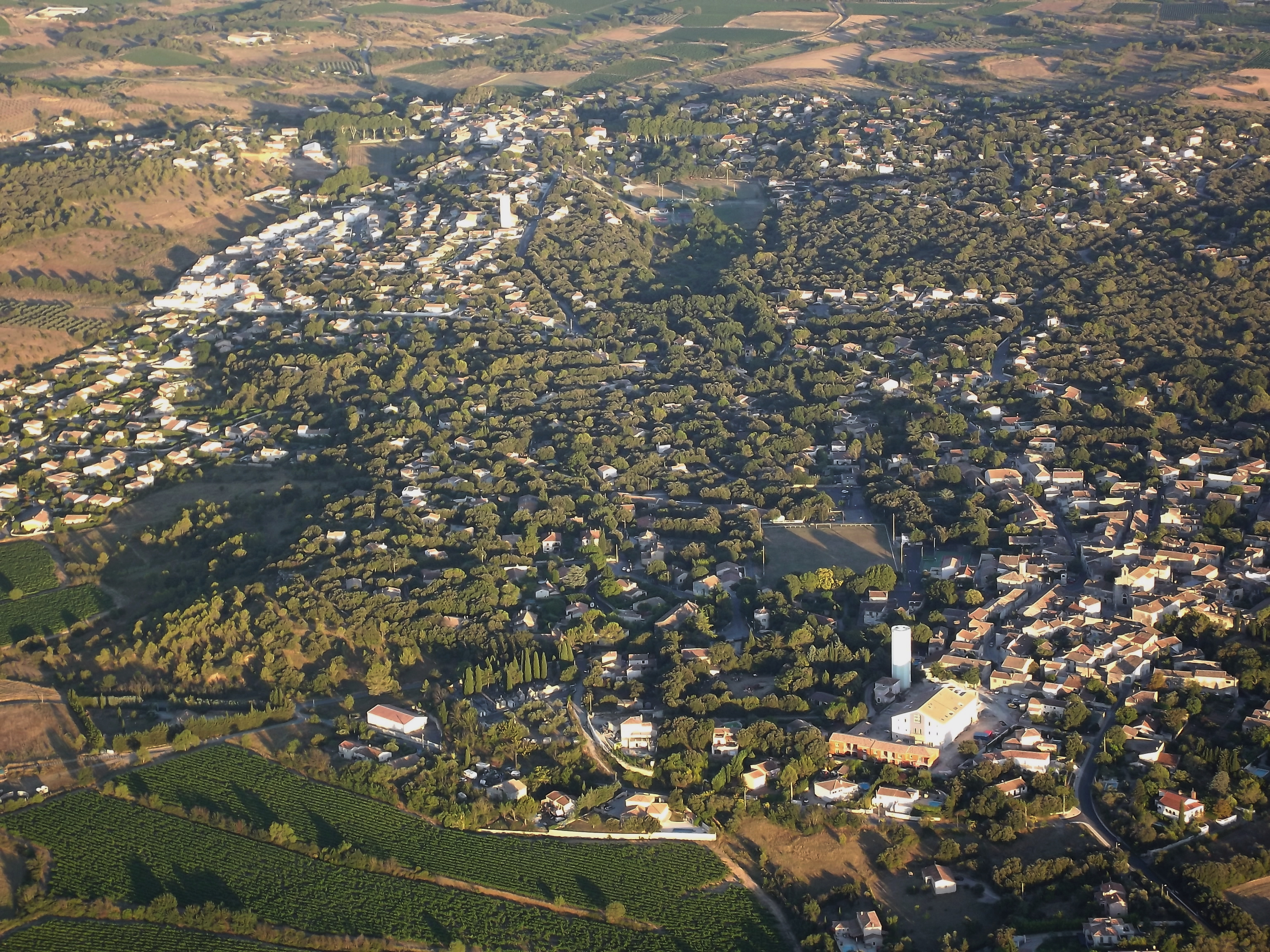
- An aerial view of Beaulieu

- Coat of arms
- Location of Beaulieu
- Location within France Location within Occitanie
- Coordinates: 43°43′43″N 4°01′19″E
- Country: France
- Region: Occitania
- Department: Hérault
- Arrondissement: Montpellier
- Canton: Le Crès
- Intercommunality: Montpellier Méditerranée Métropole

Government
  - Mayor (2020–2026): Arnaud Moynier
- Area^{1}: 7.73 km^{2} (2.98 sq mi)
- Elevation: 90 m (300 ft)
- Highest elevation: 105 m (344 ft)
- Lowest elevation: 47 m (154 ft)
- Population (2023): 2,264
  - Density: 293/km^{2} (759/sq mi)
- Time zone: UTC+01:00 (CET)
  - Summer (DST): UTC+02:00 (CEST)
- INSEE/Postal code: 34027 /34160
- ^{1} French Land Register data, which excludes lakes, ponds, glaciers > 1 km^{2} (0.386 sq mi or 247 acres) and river estuaries.

Beaulieu (French pronunciation: [boljø]; Occitan: Bèl Luòc d'Erau) is a commune in the Hérault department in the Occitanie region in southern France.

Beaulieu is an urban commune with a population of 2,264 in 2023, having experienced significant population growth since 1962. It is the central town of the Beaulieu agglomeration and is part of the Montpellier metropolitan area.

== Population ==
Historical population
Year	Pop.	±% p.a.
1968	508	—
1975	556	+1.30%
1982	739	+4.15%
1990	921	+2.79%
1999	1,400	+4.76%
2007	1,592	+1.62%
2012	1,667	+0.92%
2017	1,946	+3.14%
2023	2,264	+2.55%
Source: INSEE

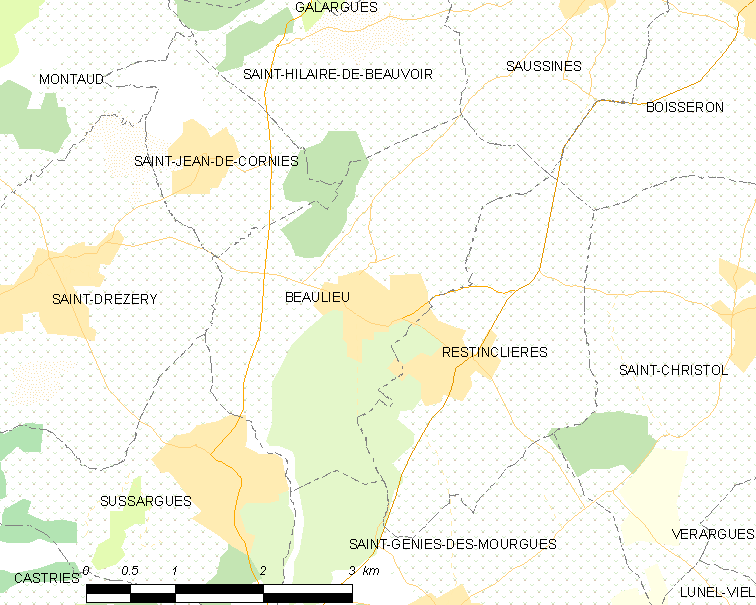
Map

== See also ==
- Communes of the Hérault department
