= Montferrier-sur-Lez =

- Commune
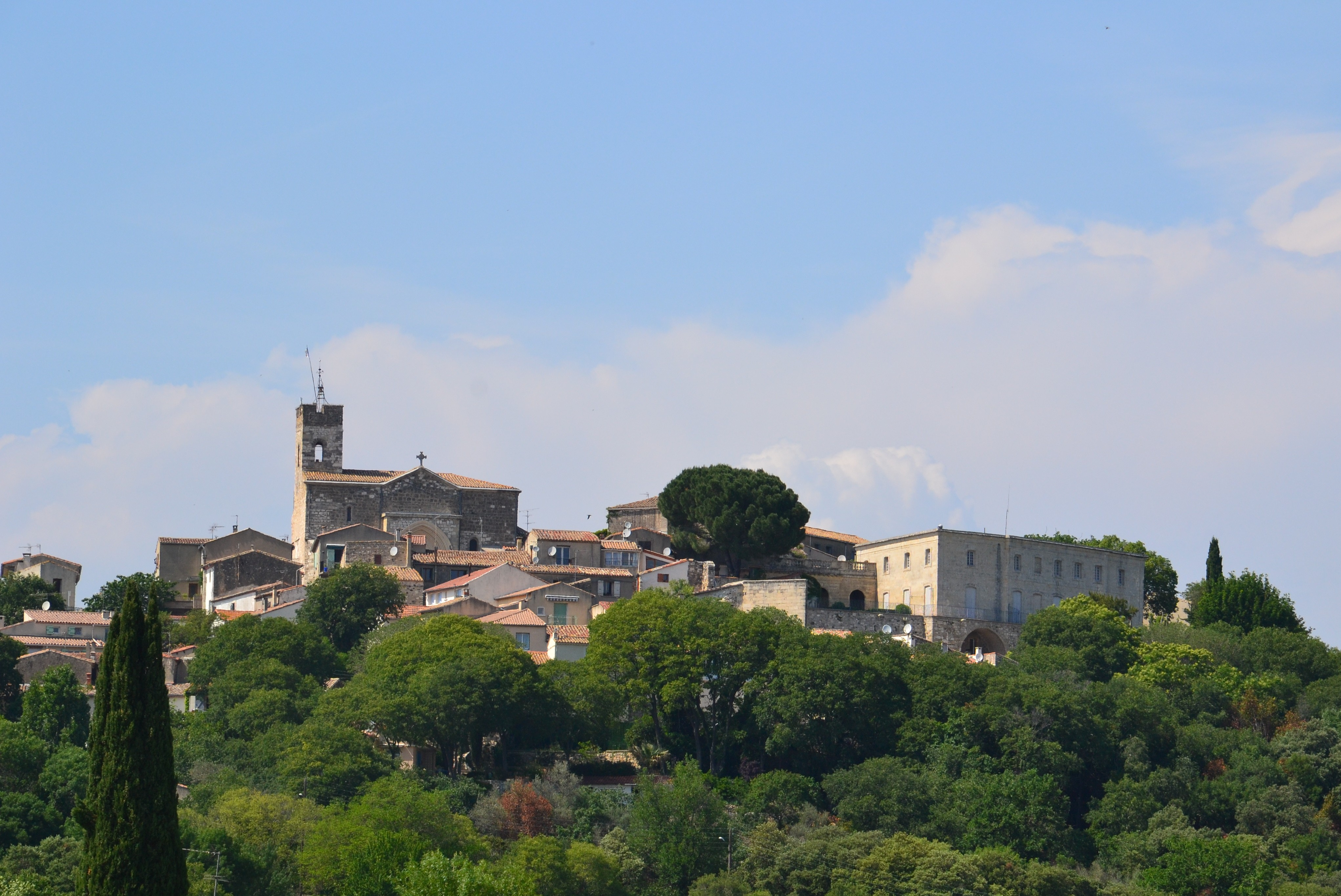
- The old village of Montferrier-sur-Lez

- Coat of arms
- Location of Montferrier-sur-Lez
- Location within France Location within Occitanie
- Coordinates: 43°40′10″N 3°51′29″E
- Country: France
- Region: Occitania
- Department: Hérault
- Arrondissement: Montpellier
- Canton: Montpellier - Castelnau-le-Lez
- Intercommunality: Montpellier Méditerranée Métropole

Government
  - Mayor (2020–2026): Brigitte Devoisselle
- Area^{1}: 7.7 km^{2} (3.0 sq mi)
- Elevation: 125 m (410 ft)
- Highest elevation: 149 m (489 ft)
- Lowest elevation: 36 m (118 ft)
- Population (2023): 4,135
  - Density: 540/km^{2} (1,400/sq mi)
- Time zone: UTC+01:00 (CET)
  - Summer (DST): UTC+02:00 (CEST)
- INSEE/Postal code: 34169 /34980
- ^{1} French Land Register data, which excludes lakes, ponds, glaciers > 1 km^{2} (0.386 sq mi or 247 acres) and river estuaries.

Montferrier-sur-Lez (French pronunciation: [mɔ̃fɛʁje syʁ lɛz], literally Montferrier on Lez; Occitan: Montferrièr de Les) is a commune in the Hérault department in Occitanie in southern France.

== Population ==
Historical population
Year	Pop.	±% p.a.
1968	1,105	—
1975	1,684	+6.20%
1982	2,015	+2.60%
1990	2,670	+3.58%
1999	3,292	+2.35%
2007	3,440	+0.55%
2012	3,446	+0.03%
2017	3,720	+1.54%
2023	4,135	+1.78%
Source: INSEE

== See also ==
- Communes of the Hérault department
