= Saint-Brès, Hérault =

Saint-Brès
- Commune
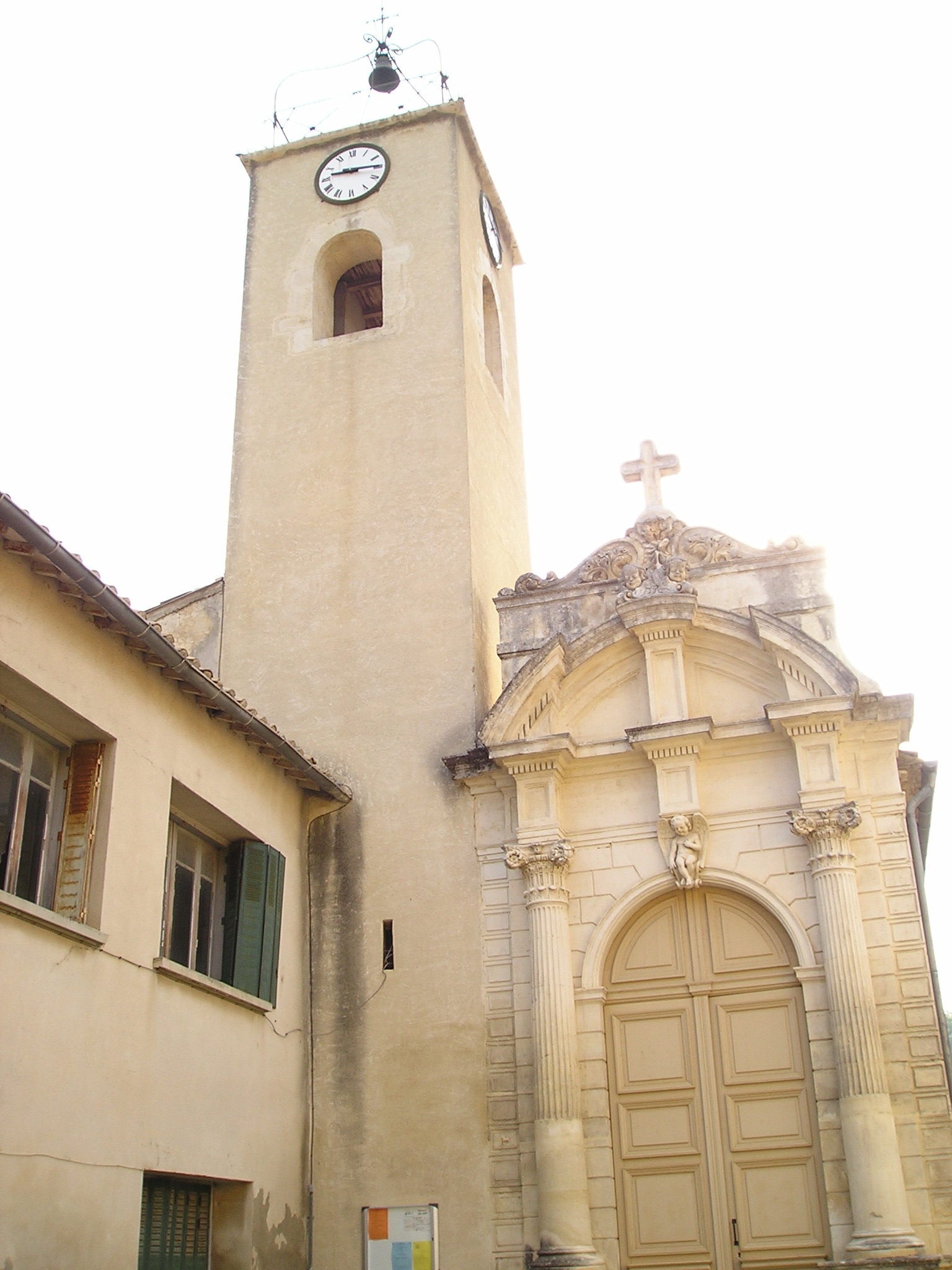
- The church of Saint-Brès

- Coat of arms
- Location of Saint-Brès
- Location within France Location within Occitanie
- Coordinates: 43°40′06″N 4°01′48″E
- Country: France
- Region: Occitania
- Department: Hérault
- Arrondissement: Montpellier
- Canton: Le Crès
- Intercommunality: Montpellier Méditerranée Métropole

Government
  - Mayor (2020–2026): Laurent Jaoul
- Area^{1}: 4.86 km^{2} (1.88 sq mi)
- Elevation: 23 m (75 ft)
- Highest elevation: 41 m (135 ft)
- Lowest elevation: 13 m (43 ft)
- Population (2023): 3,623
  - Density: 745/km^{2} (1,930/sq mi)
- Time zone: UTC+01:00 (CET)
  - Summer (DST): UTC+02:00 (CEST)
- INSEE/Postal code: 34244 /34670
- ^{1} French Land Register data, which excludes lakes, ponds, glaciers > 1 km^{2} (0.386 sq mi or 247 acres) and river estuaries.

Saint-Brès (French pronunciation: [sɛ̃ bʁɛs]; Occitan: Sant Breç) is a commune in the Hérault department in the Occitanie region in southern France.

== Population ==
Historical population
Year	Pop.	±% p.a.
1968	573	—
1975	1,094	+9.68%
1982	1,515	+4.76%
1990	1,958	+3.26%
1999	2,477	+2.65%
2007	2,626	+0.73%
2012	2,674	+0.36%
2017	2,948	+1.97%
2023	3,623	+3.50%
Source: INSEE

== See also ==
- Communes of the Hérault department
