= Baillargues =

- Commune
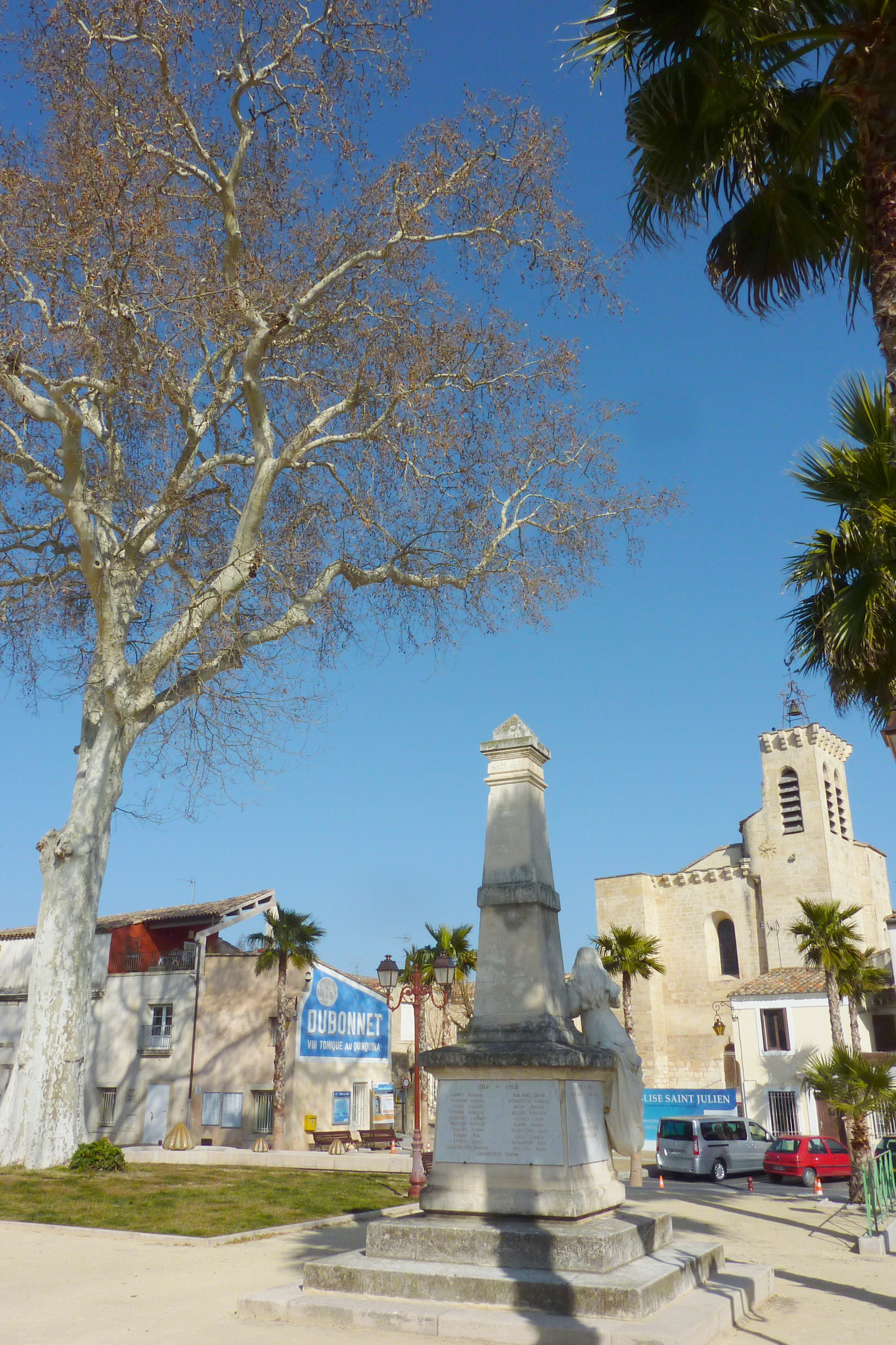
- The church square in Baillargues

- Coat of arms
- Location of Baillargues
- Location within France Location within Occitanie
- Coordinates: 43°39′43″N 4°00′49″E
- Country: France
- Region: Occitania
- Department: Hérault
- Arrondissement: Montpellier
- Canton: Le Crès
- Intercommunality: Montpellier Méditerranée Métropole

Government
  - Mayor (2020–2026): Jean-Luc Meissonnier
- Area^{1}: 7.68 km^{2} (2.97 sq mi)
- Highest elevation: 58 m (190 ft)
- Lowest elevation: 12.5 m (41 ft)
- Population (2023): 7,829
  - Density: 1,020/km^{2} (2,640/sq mi)
- Time zone: UTC+01:00 (CET)
  - Summer (DST): UTC+02:00 (CEST)
- INSEE/Postal code: 34022 /34670
- ^{1} French Land Register data, which excludes lakes, ponds, glaciers > 1 km^{2} (0.386 sq mi or 247 acres) and river estuaries.

Baillargues (French pronunciation: [bajaʁɡ]; Occitan: Balhargues) is a commune in the Hérault department in the Occitanie region in southern France. Baillargues station has rail connections to Narbonne, Montpellier and Avignon.

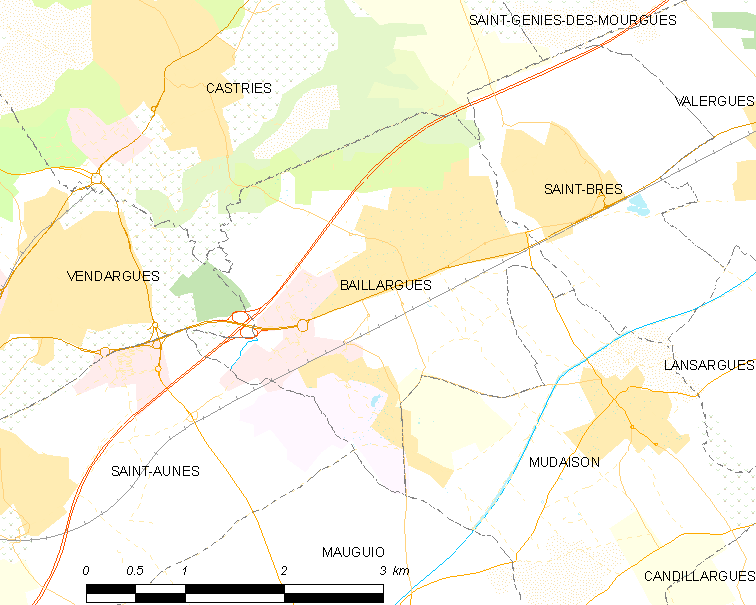
Map

== Population ==
Historical population
| Year | Pop. | ±% p.a. |
|---|---|---|
| 1968 | 1,279 | — |
| 1975 | 1,504 | +2.34% |
| 1982 | 2,632 | +8.32% |
| 1990 | 4,375 | +6.56% |
| 1999 | 5,842 | +3.27% |
| 2007 | 5,948 | +0.23% |
| 2012 | 6,548 | +1.94% |
| 2017 | 7,754 | +3.44% |
| 2023 | 7,829 | +0.16% |
Source: INSEE

== See also ==
- Communes of the Hérault department
