= Saint-Geniès-des-Mourgues =

- Commune
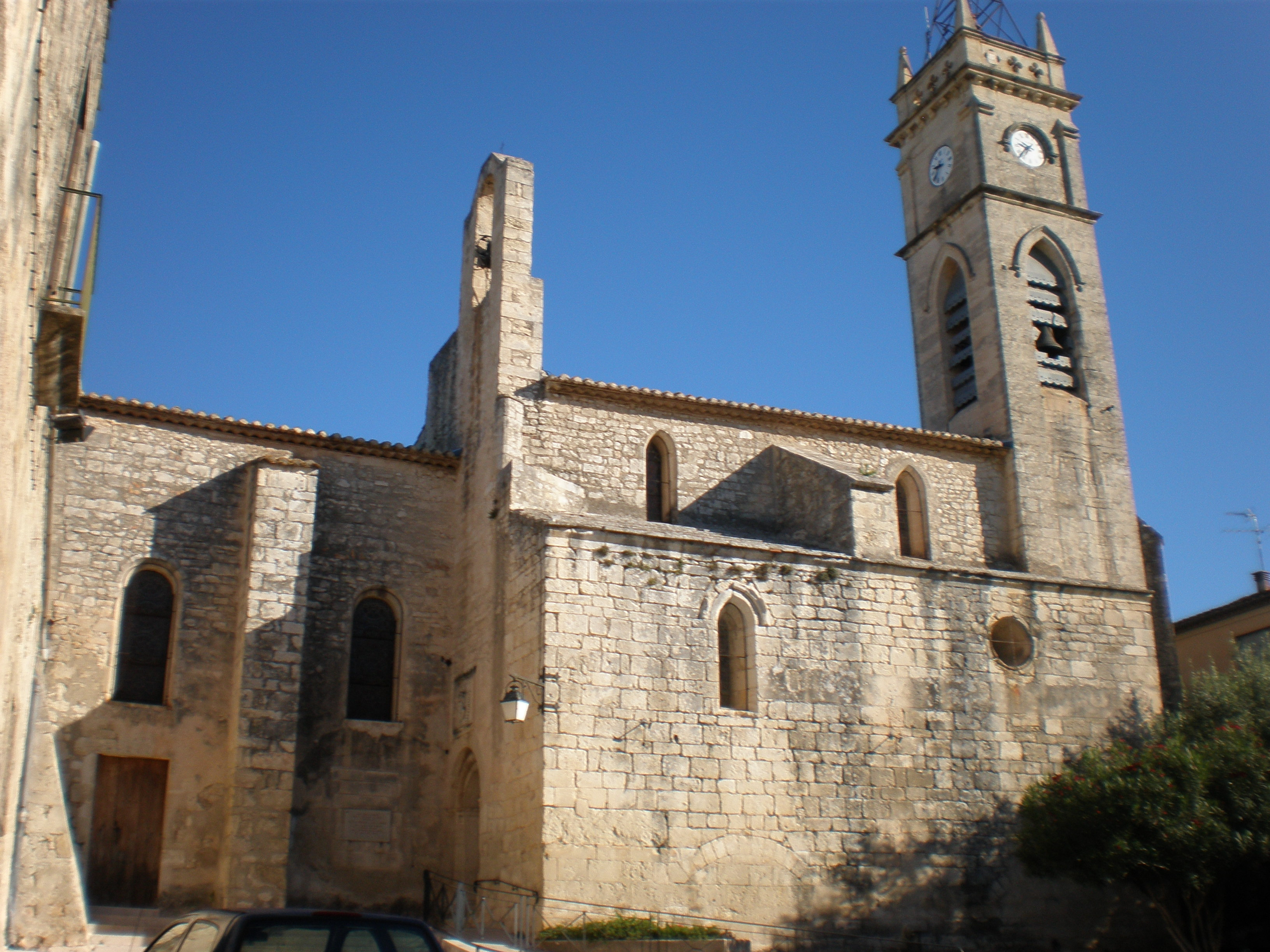
- The church of Saint-Geniès-des-Mourgues

- Coat of arms
- Location of Saint-Geniès-des-Mourgues
- Location within France Location within Occitanie
- Coordinates: 43°41′52″N 4°02′10″E
- Country: France
- Region: Occitania
- Department: Hérault
- Arrondissement: Montpellier
- Canton: Le Crès
- Intercommunality: Montpellier Méditerranée Métropole

Government
  - Mayor (2020–2026): Yvon Pellet
- Area^{1}: 11.37 km^{2} (4.39 sq mi)
- Elevation: 43 m (141 ft)
- Highest elevation: 90 m (300 ft)
- Lowest elevation: 23 m (75 ft)
- Population (2023): 2,148
  - Density: 188.9/km^{2} (489.3/sq mi)
- Time zone: UTC+01:00 (CET)
  - Summer (DST): UTC+02:00 (CEST)
- INSEE/Postal code: 34256 /34160
- ^{1} French Land Register data, which excludes lakes, ponds, glaciers > 1 km^{2} (0.386 sq mi or 247 acres) and river estuaries.

Saint-Geniès-des-Mourgues (French pronunciation: [sɛ̃ ʒənjɛs de muʁɡ]; Occitan: Sant Ginièis de Morgas) is a commune in the Hérault department in the Occitanie region in southern France.

== Population ==
Historical population
Year	Pop.	±% p.a.
1968	862	—
1975	834	−0.47%
1982	1,112	+4.20%
1990	1,415	+3.06%
1999	1,509	+0.72%
2007	1,609	+0.81%
2012	1,833	+2.64%
2017	1,876	+0.46%
2023	2,148	+2.28%
Source: INSEE

== See also ==
- Communes of the Hérault department
