= Canton of Montpellier-2 =

Coordinates: 43.62°N 3.86°E

Montpellier-2
- Canton
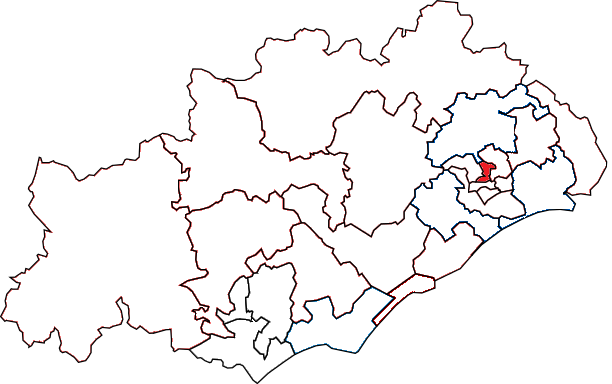
- Interactive map of Montpellier-2
- Country: France
- Region: Occitania
- Department: Hérault
- No. of communes: {{{nbcomm}}}

Government
  - Representatives (2021–2028): Jean-Louis Gély; Gabrielle Henry
- Population (2023): 57,346
- INSEE code: 34 16

The canton of Montpellier-2 is an administrative division of the Hérault department, southern France. Its borders were modified at the French canton reorganisation which came into effect in March 2015. Its seat is in Montpellier.

== Composition ==
It consists of the following communes:

1. Montpellier (partly)

== Councillors ==
Election	Councillors	Party	Occupation
2015	Michaël Delafosse	PS	History-geography teacher
2015	Gabrielle Henry	PS	Retired from the hospital public service
