= Le Crès =

- Commune
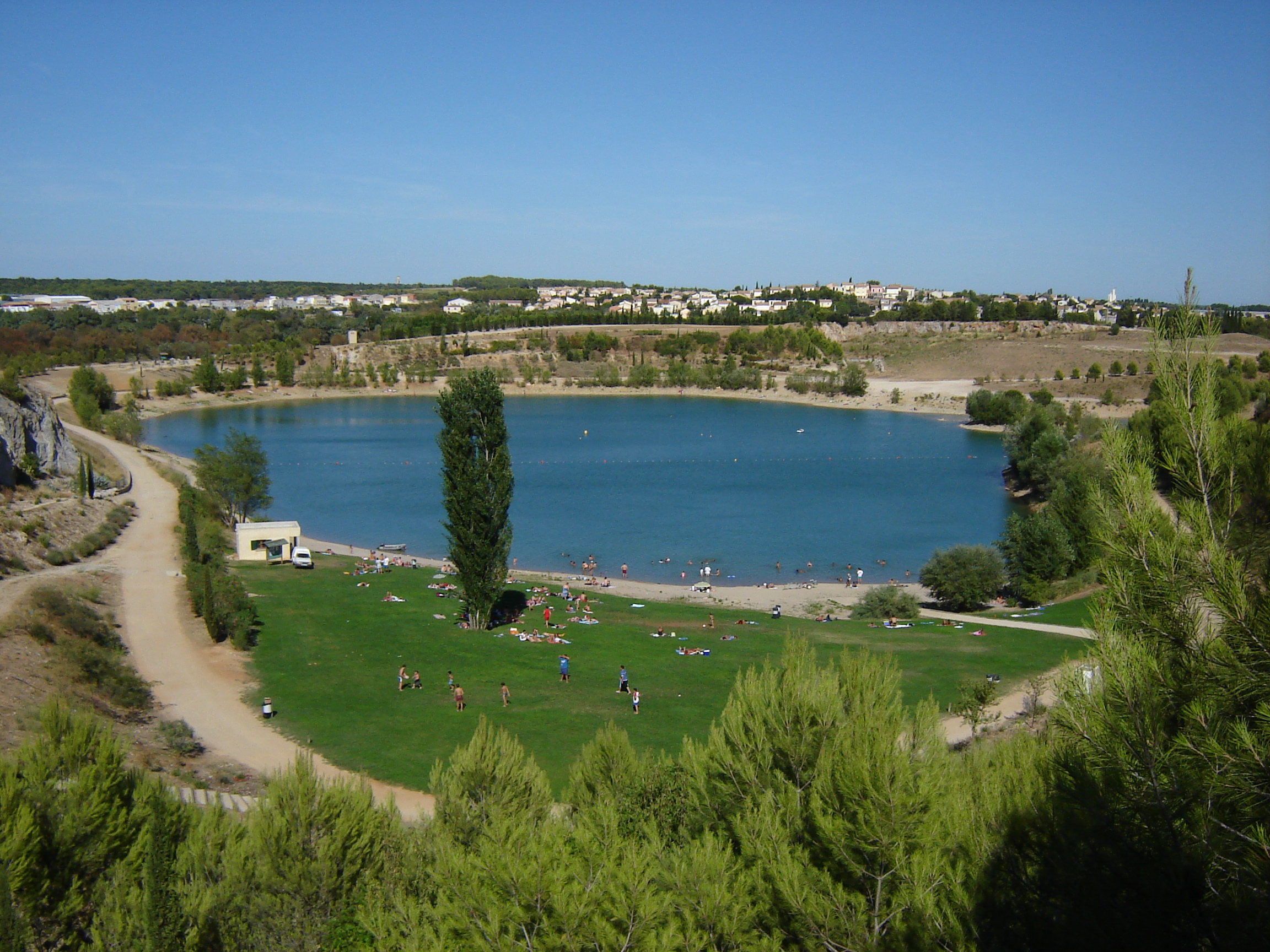
- Lake

- Coat of arms
- Location of Le Crès
- Location within France Location within Occitanie
- Coordinates: 43°38′53″N 3°56′23″E
- Country: France
- Region: Occitania
- Department: Hérault
- Arrondissement: Montpellier
- Canton: Le Crès
- Intercommunality: Montpellier Méditerranée Métropole

Government
  - Mayor (2020–2026): Stéphane Champay
- Area^{1}: 5.84 km^{2} (2.25 sq mi)
- Elevation: 70 m (230 ft)
- Highest elevation: 83 m (272 ft)
- Lowest elevation: 29 m (95 ft)
- Population (2023): 9,226
  - Density: 1,580/km^{2} (4,090/sq mi)
- Time zone: UTC+01:00 (CET)
  - Summer (DST): UTC+02:00 (CEST)
- INSEE/Postal code: 34090 /34920
- ^{1} French Land Register data, which excludes lakes, ponds, glaciers > 1 km^{2} (0.386 sq mi or 247 acres) and river estuaries.

Le Crès (French pronunciation: [lə kʁɛs]; Languedocien: Lo Crèç) is a commune in the Hérault department in southern France. The town has three football stadiums and a secondary school. Every year there is a village party with bulls in the arena and in the streets.

== Population ==
Historical population
Year	Pop.	±% p.a.
1968	1,388	—
1975	4,529	+18.41%
1982	6,088	+4.32%
1990	6,601	+1.02%
1999	6,800	+0.33%
2007	6,886	+0.16%
2012	8,430	+4.13%
2017	9,321	+2.03%
2023	9,226	−0.17%
Source: INSEE

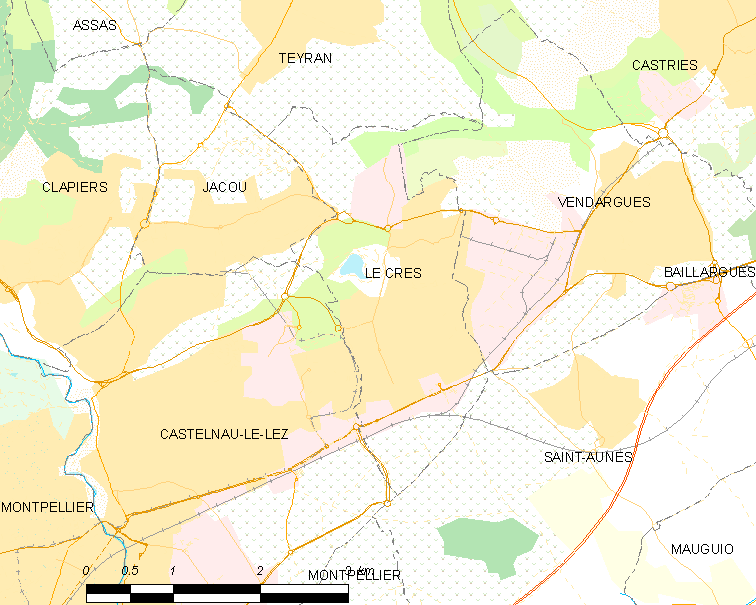
Map

== See also ==
- Communes of the Hérault department
- Castelnau-le Crès FC
