= Montaud, Hérault =

Montaud
- Commune
- Coat of arms
- Location of Montaud
- Location within France Location within Occitanie
- Coordinates: 43°45′07″N 3°57′23″E
- Country: France
- Region: Occitania
- Department: Hérault
- Arrondissement: Montpellier
- Canton: Le Crès
- Intercommunality: Montpellier Méditerranée Métropole

Government
  - Mayor (2020–2026): Joël Raymond
- Area^{1}: 12.92 km^{2} (4.99 sq mi)
- Elevation: 110 m (360 ft)
- Highest elevation: 210 m (690 ft)
- Lowest elevation: 51 m (167 ft)
- Population (2023): 1,014
  - Density: 78.48/km^{2} (203.3/sq mi)
- Time zone: UTC+01:00 (CET)
  - Summer (DST): UTC+02:00 (CEST)
- INSEE/Postal code: 34164 /34160
- ^{1} French Land Register data, which excludes lakes, ponds, glaciers > 1 km^{2} (0.386 sq mi or 247 acres) and river estuaries.

Montaud (French pronunciation: [mɔ̃to]; Occitan: Montaut) is a commune in the Hérault department in the Occitanie region in southern France.

Montaud is a mountain village with a dozen hamlets. It contains a school, a city hall, a church, and a few farms. Most inhabitants of Montaud work in nearby Montpellier, many as researchers, teachers, engineers and technicians.

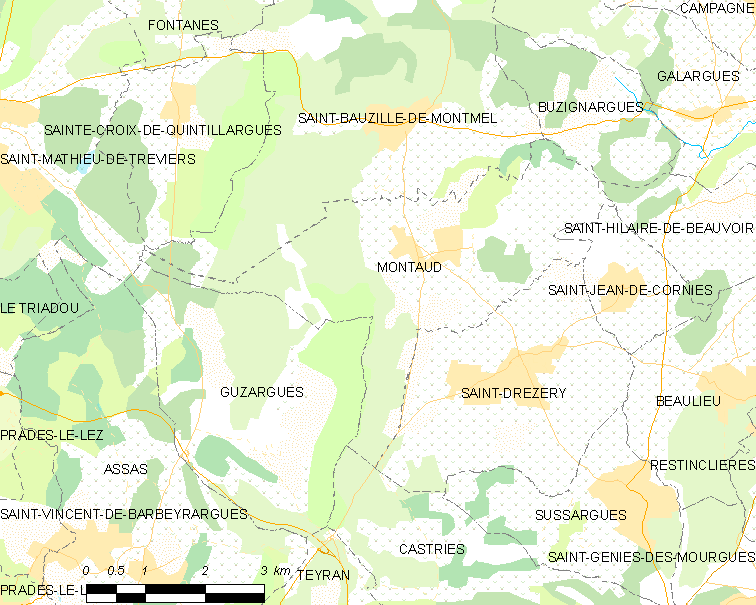
Map

== History ==
French Cardinal, Bertrand Pierre (Cardinal de Colombier), who was used by the popes at Avignon for agent in wartime missions during the Hundred Years War and in the election of Charles of Bohemia to the imperial throne, died in Montaud in 1361.

Montaud is located in the north of the Vercors, an important site of the French Resistance during World War II. (Montaud located in the Vercors is another village "montaud 38") Children from the primary school of Montaud participated in a "spacetalk" via ARISS radio contact with astronaut Mike Finckle, aboard the International Space Station in 2004.

== Population ==
Historical population
Year	Pop.	±% p.a.
1968	290	—
1975	298	+0.39%
1982	413	+4.77%
1990	545	+3.53%
1999	616	+1.37%
2007	848	+4.08%
2012	949	+2.28%
2017	991	+0.87%
2023	1,014	+0.38%
Source: INSEE

== See also ==
- Communes of the Hérault department
