= Castelnau-le-Lez =

Castelnau-le-Lez Castèlnòu de Les (Occitan)
- Commune
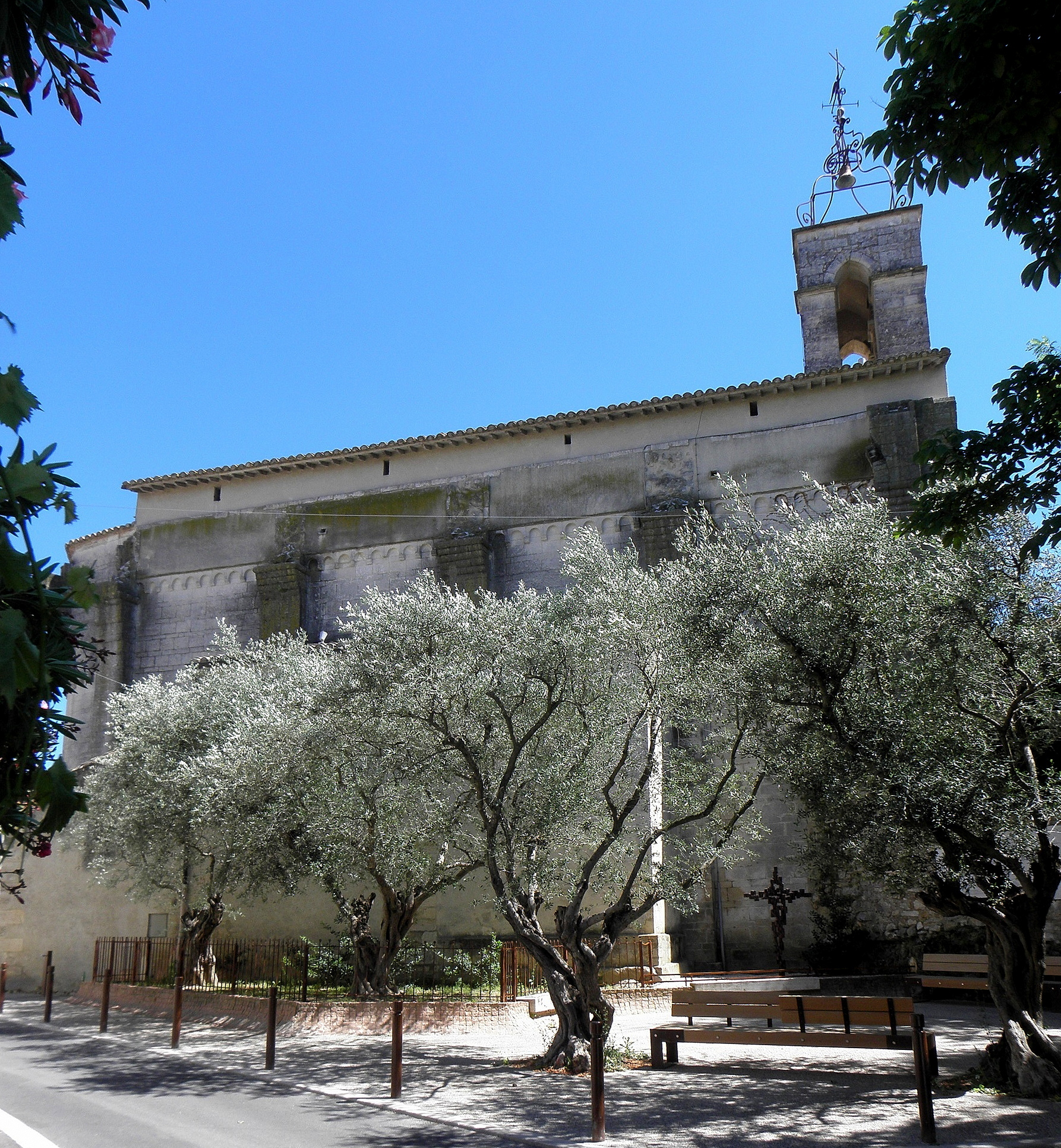
- Church Saint-Jean-Baptiste

- Coat of arms
- Location of Castelnau-le-Lez
- Location within France Location within Occitanie
- Coordinates: 43°38′13″N 3°54′07″E
- Country: France
- Region: Occitania
- Department: Hérault
- Arrondissement: Montpellier
- Canton: Montpellier - Castelnau-le-Lez
- Intercommunality: Montpellier Méditerranée Métropole

Government
  - Mayor (2020–2026): Frédéric Lafforgue
- Area^{1}: 11.18 km^{2} (4.32 sq mi)
- Elevation: 60 m (200 ft)
- Highest elevation: 93 m (305 ft)
- Lowest elevation: 19 m (62 ft)
- Population (2023): 26,058
  - Density: 2,331/km^{2} (6,037/sq mi)
- Time zone: UTC+01:00 (CET)
  - Summer (DST): UTC+02:00 (CEST)
- INSEE/Postal code: 34057 /34170
- ^{1} French Land Register data, which excludes lakes, ponds, glaciers > 1 km^{2} (0.386 sq mi or 247 acres) and river estuaries.

Castelnau-le-Lez (French pronunciation: [kastɛlno lə lɛz]; Occitan: Castèlnòu de Les) is a commune in the Hérault department in the Occitanie region of Southern France. Located on the outskirts of Montpellier, it is situated around 3 km (1.8 mi) north of the city centre.

== Geography ==
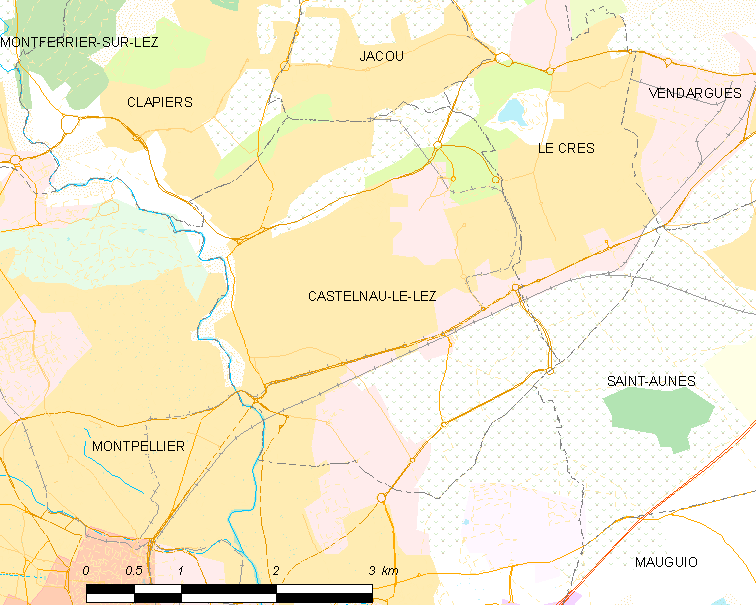
Map

Castelnau-le-Lez is served by Line 2 of the Montpellier tramway.

== Population ==
Historical population

Year	Pop.	±% p.a.
1793	450	—
1800	496	+1.40%
1806	547	+1.64%
1821	696	+1.62%
1831	673	−0.34%
1836	745	+2.05%
1841	787	+1.10%
1846	794	+0.18%
1851	861	+1.63%
1856	827	−0.80%
1861	894	+1.57%
1866	1,120	+4.61%
1872	906	−3.47%
1876	884	−0.61%
1881	815	−1.61%
1886	884	+1.64%
1891	954	+1.54%
1896	1,141	+3.64%
1901	1,213	+1.23%

Year	Pop.	±% p.a.
1906	1,202	−0.18%
1911	1,103	−1.70%
1921	1,120	+0.15%
1926	1,504	+6.07%
1931	1,959	+5.43%
1936	2,226	+2.59%
1946	2,345	+0.52%
1954	2,923	+2.79%
1962	4,979	+6.88%
1968	8,169	+8.60%
1975	9,339	+1.93%
1982	9,884	+0.81%
1990	11,043	+1.40%
1999	14,214	+2.84%
2007	15,201	+0.84%
2012	16,664	+1.85%
2017	20,480	+4.21%
2023	26,058	+4.10%

Source: EHESS and INSEE (1968-2023)

== History ==
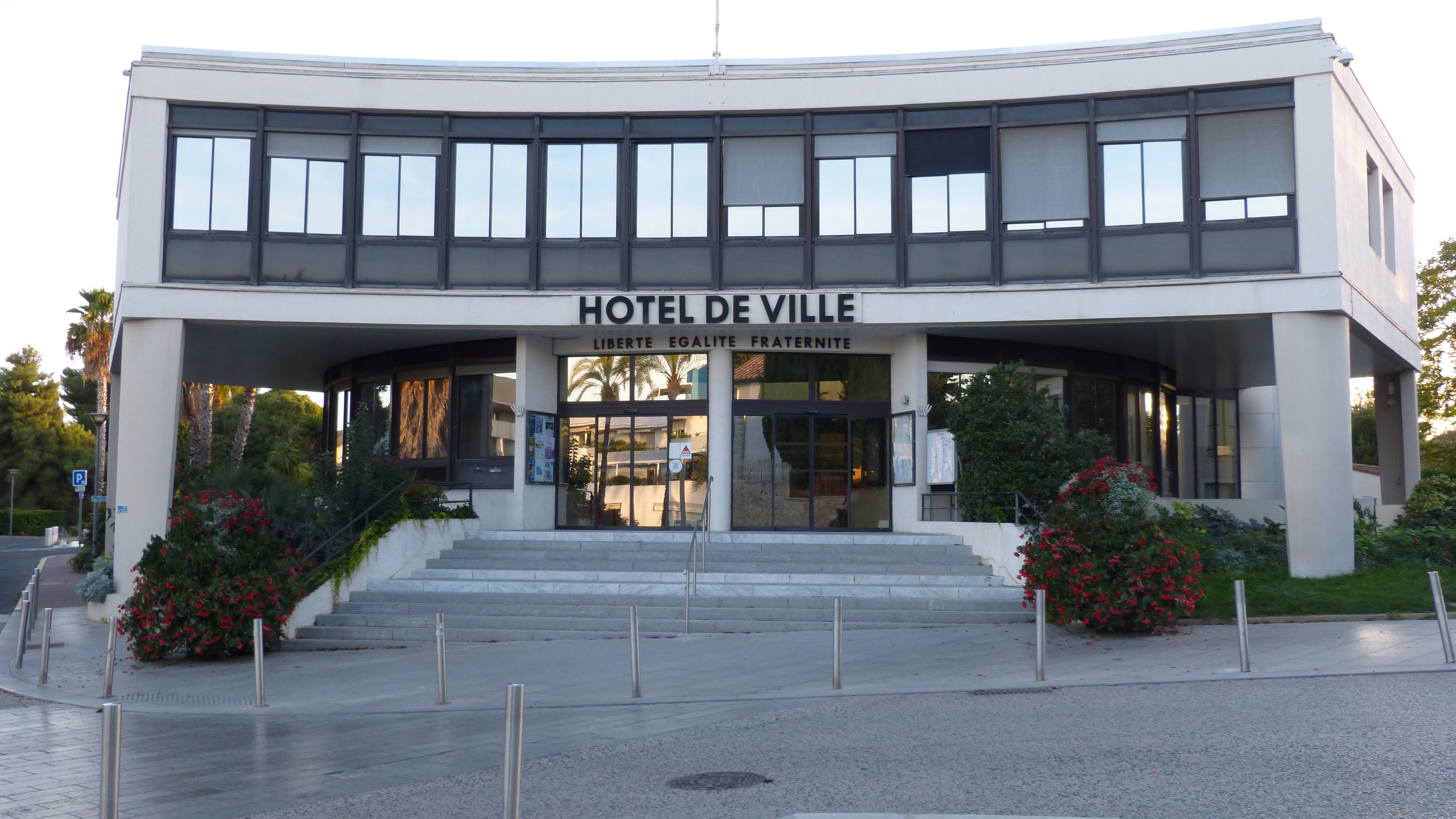
The Hôtel de Ville

Hundreds of Jewish children were hidden in the town of Castelnau-le-Lez during the Holocaust. Almost every home hid children, in some cases from multiple families. After the war, the children whose parents had survived were returned to them. The people of the town and the local priest were well aware of the situation and, at least tacitly, supported it. The Hôtel de Ville was completed in 1972.

== Twin towns ==
Castelnau-le-Lez is twinned with:

- Plankstadt, Germany
- Argenta, Emilia–Romagna, Italy
- San Fernando de Henares, Spain

== See also ==
- Communes of the Hérault department
- Giant of Castelnau
