= Canton of Montpellier - Castelnau-le-Lez =

Coordinates: 43.62°N 3.87°E

Montpellier - Castelnau-le-Lez
- Canton
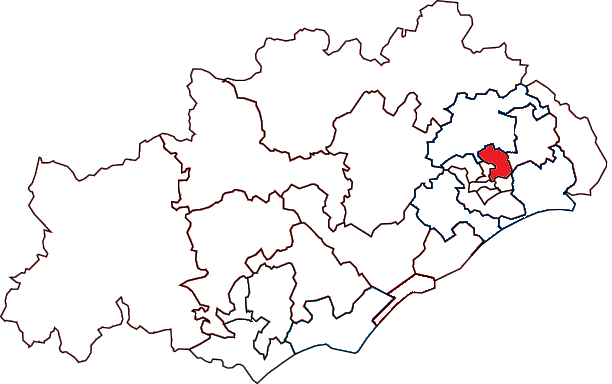
- Interactive map of Montpellier - Castelnau-le-Lez
- Country: France
- Region: Occitania
- Department: Hérault
- No. of communes: {{{nbcomm}}}

Government
  - Representatives (2021–2028): Renaud Calvat; Jacqueline Markovic
- Area: 30.00 km^{2} (11.58 sq mi)
- Population (2023): 69,580
  - Density: 2,319/km^{2} (6,007/sq mi)
- INSEE code: 34 20

The canton of Montpellier - Castelnau-le-Lez is an administrative division of the Hérault department, southern France. It was created at the French canton reorganisation which came into effect in March 2015. Its seat is in Montpellier.

== Composition ==
It consists of the following communes:

1. Castelnau-le-Lez
2. Clapiers
3. Jacou
4. Montferrier-sur-Lez
5. Montpellier (partly)

== Councillors ==
Election	Councillors	Party	Occupation
2015	Renaud Calvat	PS	Mayor of Jacou
2015	Dominique Nurit	PS	Councillor of Castelnau-le-Lez
2021	Renaud Calvat	PS	Mayor of Jacou
2021	Dominique Nurit	EELV	Digital communication consultant
