= Clapiers =

- Commune
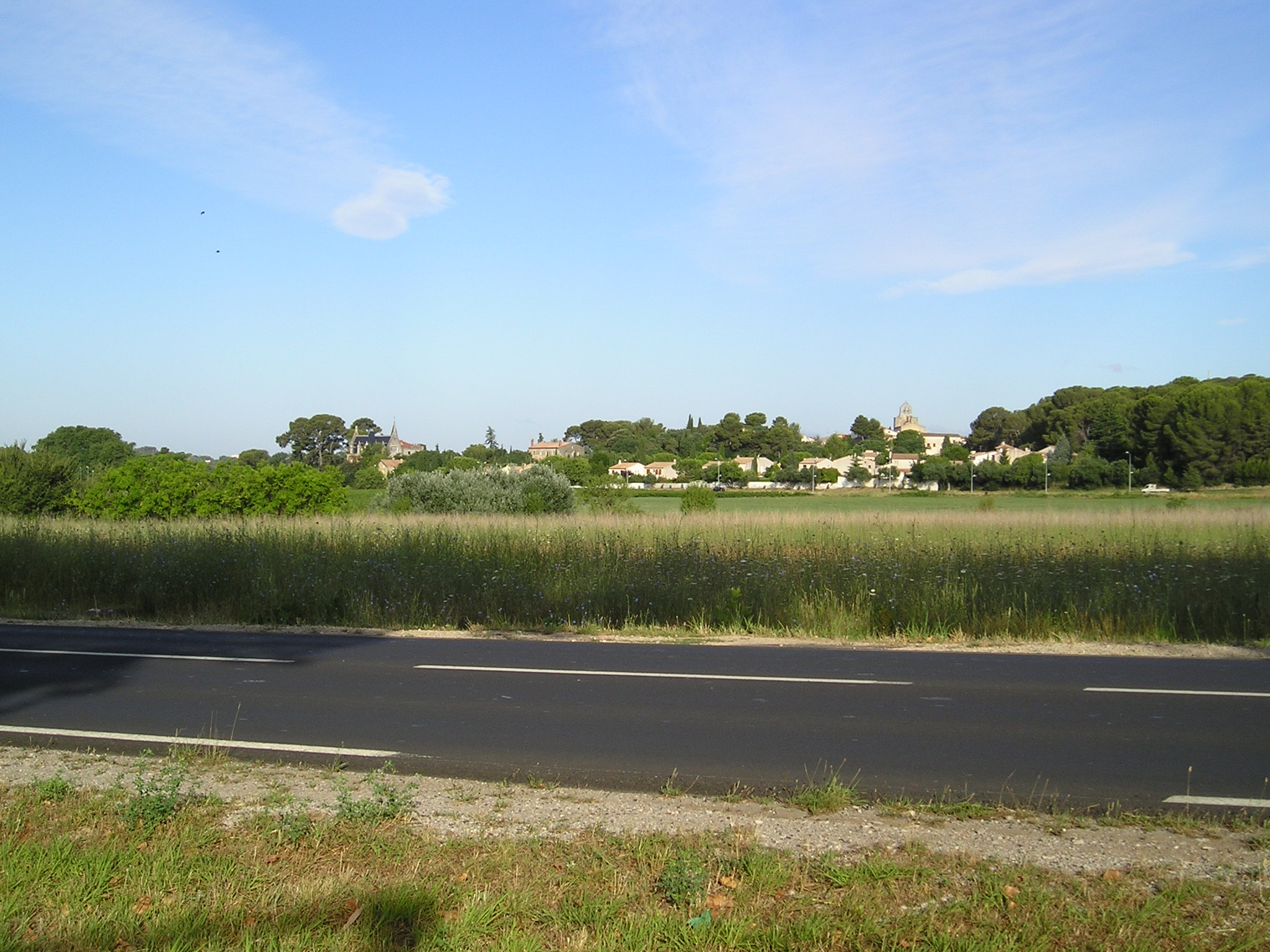
- A general view of Clapiers

- Coat of arms
- Location of Clapiers
- Location within France Location within Occitanie
- Coordinates: 43°39′30″N 3°53′21″E
- Country: France
- Region: Occitania
- Department: Hérault
- Arrondissement: Montpellier
- Canton: Montpellier - Castelnau-le-Lez
- Intercommunality: Montpellier Méditerranée Métropole

Government
  - Mayor (2020–2026): Éric Penso
- Area^{1}: 7.69 km^{2} (2.97 sq mi)
- Elevation: 25 m (82 ft)
- Highest elevation: 126 m (413 ft)
- Lowest elevation: 25 m (82 ft)
- Population (2023): 6,006
  - Density: 781/km^{2} (2,020/sq mi)
- Time zone: UTC+01:00 (CET)
  - Summer (DST): UTC+02:00 (CEST)
- INSEE/Postal code: 34077 /34830
- ^{1} French Land Register data, which excludes lakes, ponds, glaciers > 1 km^{2} (0.386 sq mi or 247 acres) and river estuaries.

Clapiers (French pronunciation: [klapje]; Occitan: Clapièrs) is a commune in the Hérault department in southern France.

== Population ==
Historical population
Year	Pop.	±% p.a.
1901	307	—
1962	326	+0.10%
1968	374	+2.32%
1975	867	+12.76%
1982	1,900	+11.86%
1990	3,478	+7.85%
1999	4,631	+3.23%
2007	5,046	+1.08%
2012	5,319	+1.06%
2017	5,478	+0.59%
2023	6,006	+1.55%
Source: EHESS and INSEE (1968-2023)

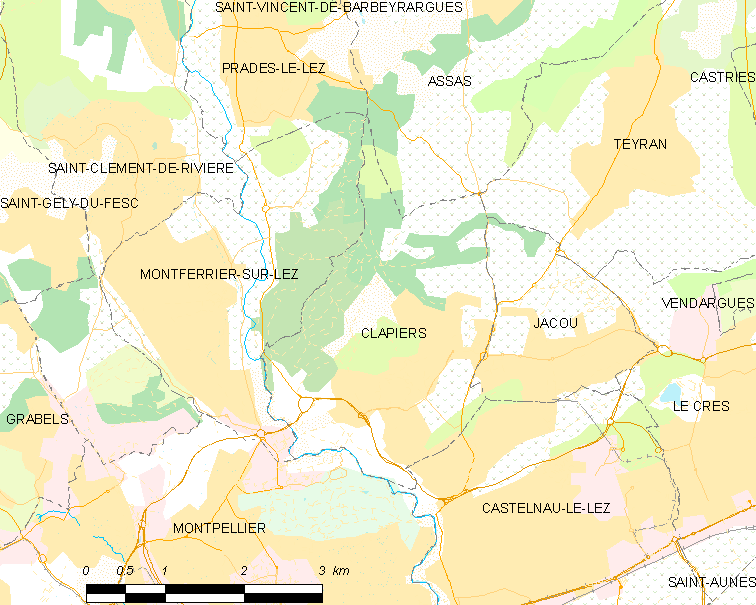
Map

== Twin towns ==
Clapiers is twinned with:

- Celestynów, Poland
- Collelongo, Italy
- Toma, Burkina Faso

== See also ==
- Communes of the Hérault department
