= Canton of Le Crès =

Coordinates: 43.65°N 3.94°E

Le Crès
- Canton
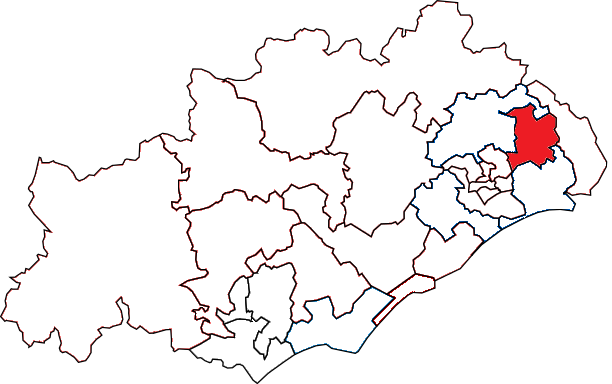
- Interactive map of Le Crès
- Country: France
- Region: Occitania
- Department: Hérault
- No. of communes: {{{nbcomm}}}

Government
  - Representatives (2021–2028): Yvon Pellet; Claudine Vassas Mejri
- Area: 106.91 km^{2} (41.28 sq mi)
- Population (2023): 48,707
  - Density: 455.59/km^{2} (1,180.0/sq mi)
- INSEE code: 34 07

The canton of Le Crès is an administrative division of the Hérault department, southern France. It was created at the French canton reorganisation which came into effect in March 2015. Its seat is in Le Crès.

== Composition ==
It consists of the following communes:

1. Baillargues
2. Beaulieu
3. Castries
4. Le Crès
5. Montaud
6. Restinclières
7. Saint-Brès
8. Saint-Drézéry
9. Saint-Geniès-des-Mourgues
10. Sussargues
11. Vendargues

== Councillors ==
Election	Councillors	Party	Occupation
2015	Yvon Pellet	DVG	Mayor of Saint-Geniès-des-Mourgues
2015	Claudine Vassas Mejri	PS	Councillor of Castries

== Pictures of the canton ==
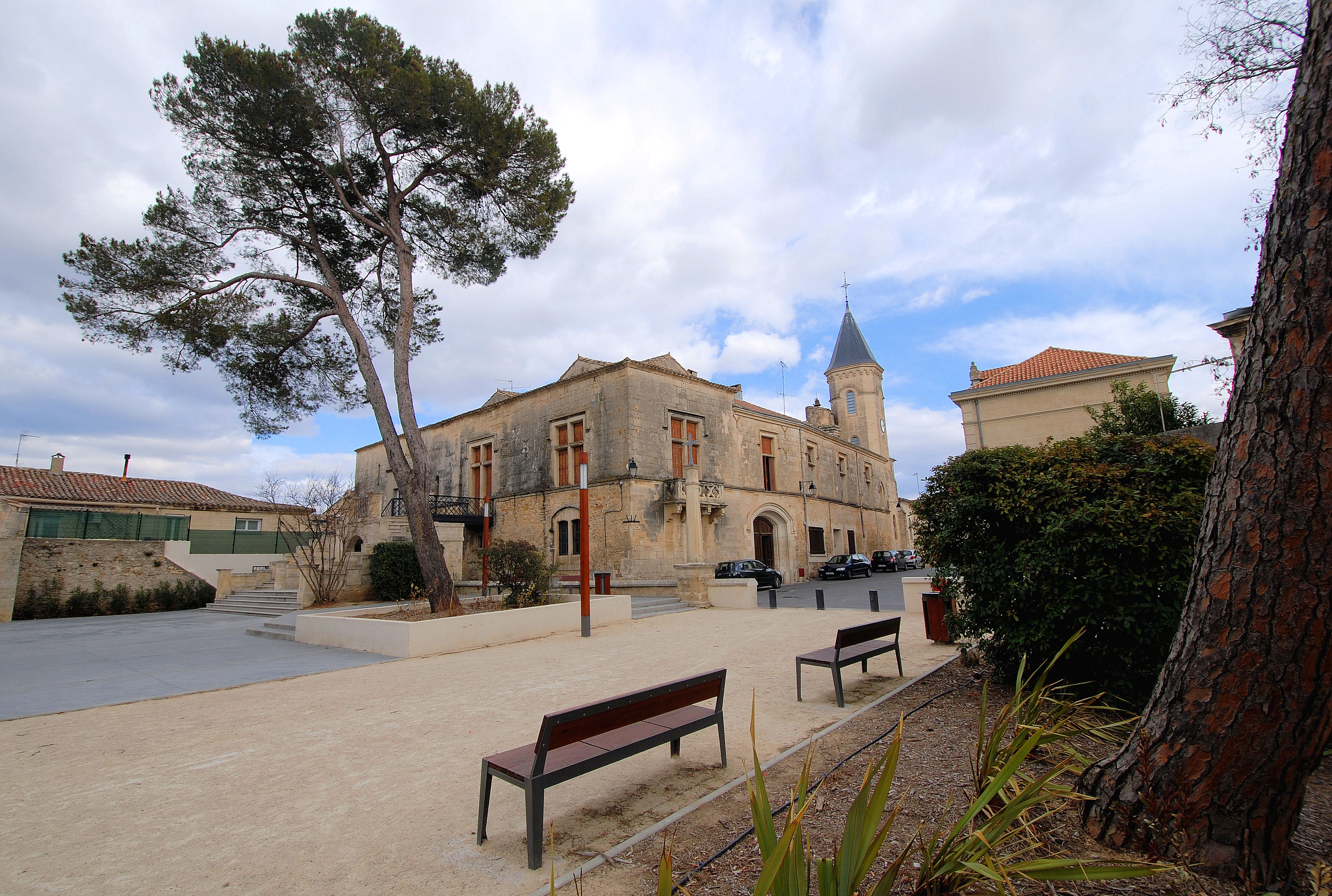
Saint-Drézéry Municipal Park

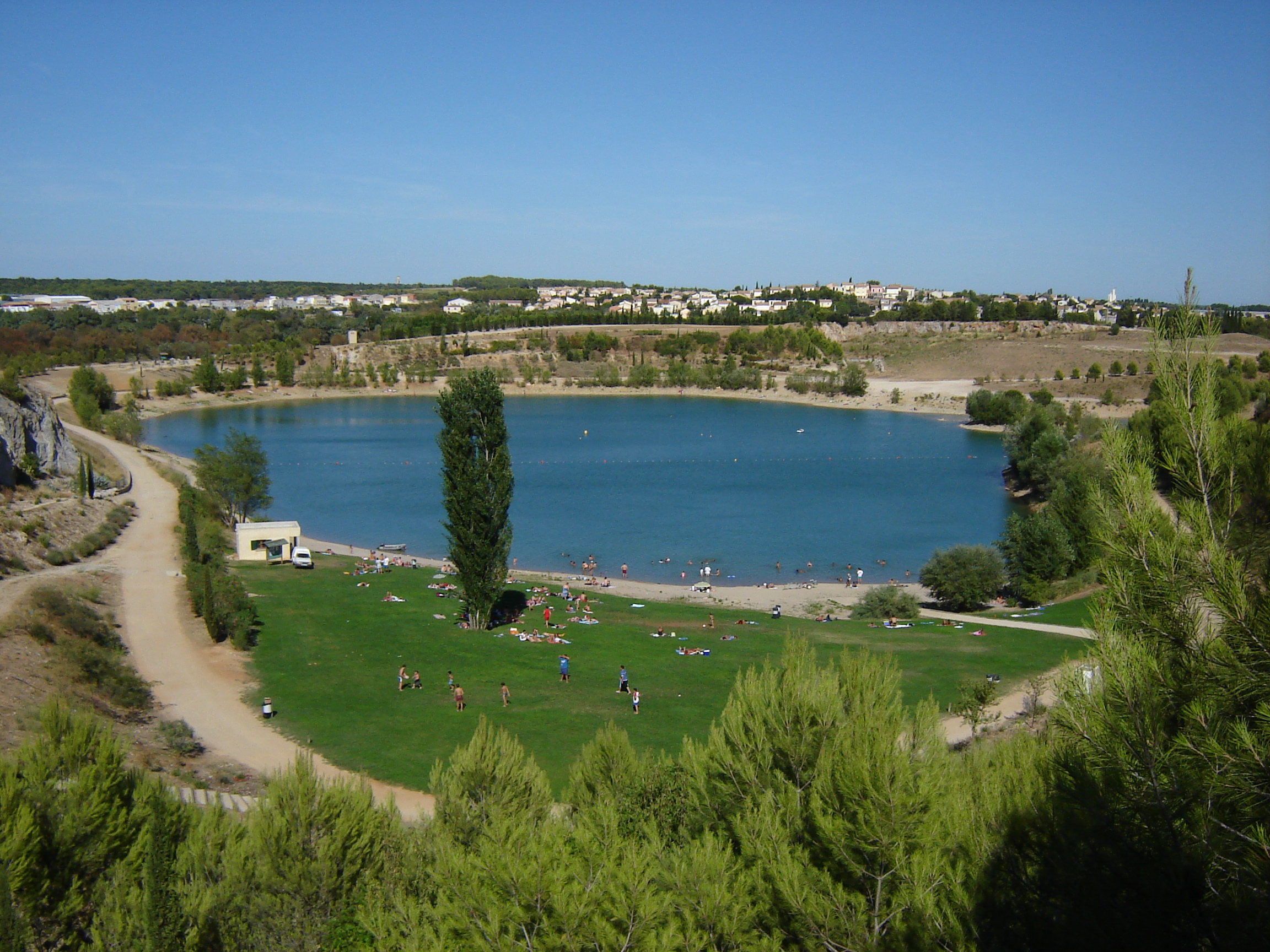
The lake of Crès

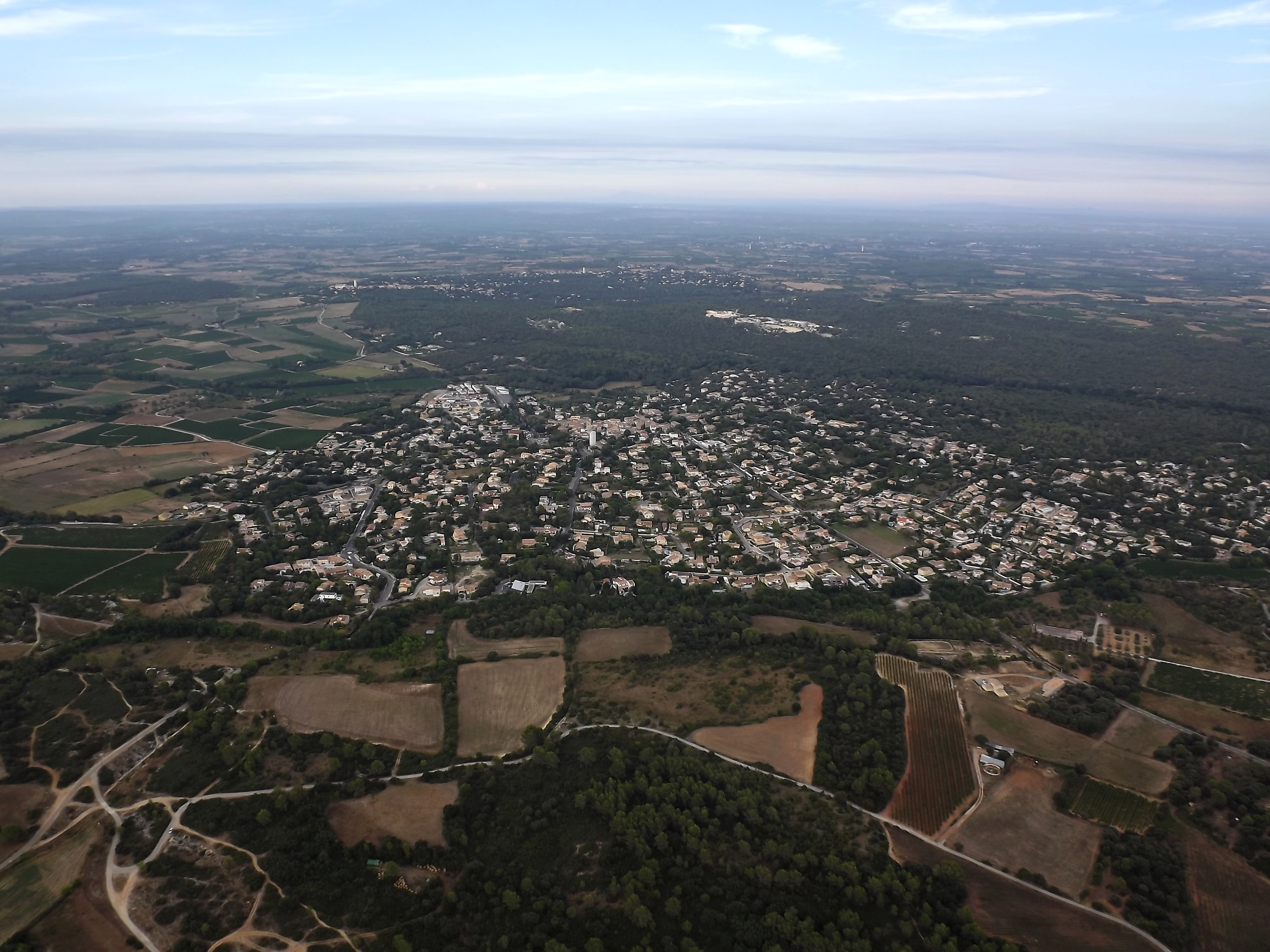
Aerial view of Sussargues
