= Oppidum de Roque de Viou =

Iron Age settlement in Occitanie, France

Coordinates: 43°47′59″N 4°13′34″E

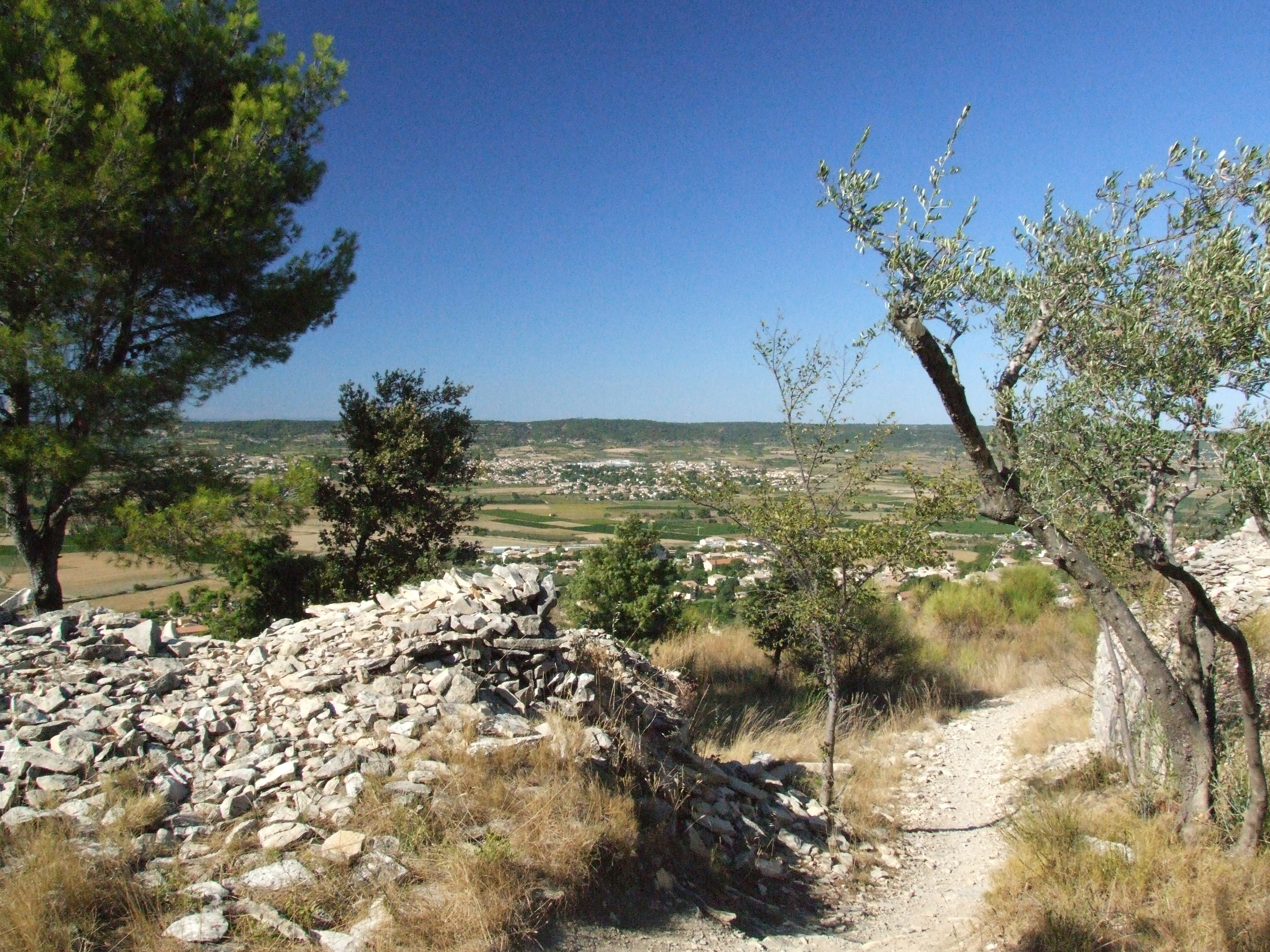
Oppidum de Roque de Viou overlooking Saint-Dionizy, Clarensac.

The Oppidum de Roque de Viou is on a hilltop overlooking the valley called the Vaunage, above the village of Nages-et-Solorgues, in Gard, between Nîmes et Sommières, in Occitanie, France. It is in the commune of Saint-Dionizy and is one of six Iron Age oppida in the Vaunage; about 200m from the Oppidum de Nages or Oppidum des Castels. It was occupied in three periods between 700 BCE and 600 BCE and between 350 BCE and 300 BCE and around 50 BCE. It has been listed since 1980 as a monument historique by the French Ministry of Culture.

== History ==
The name Vaunages is a contraction of "Vallée de Nages", the valley of Nages, which is a furrowed combe at the edge of the garrigues plateau, surrounded by 200m-high hills that isolate it from the surroundings. There are two natural entrances, one to east coming from Nîmes, and one to the south towards Vergèze. As the name suggests Nages, and the hill behind play a dominant rôle in the area. There are hundreds of archaeological sites in the Vaunage.

These valleys have been populated for over 2,000 years. Six oppida, dominated by that at Nages, were home to the Volques Arécomiques, who built them in the 8th century BC and remained there till the 1st century AD :

- Oppidum de Nages in the commune of Nages-et-Solorgues;
- Oppidum de Roque de Viou, an earlier settlement in the commune of Saint-Dionizy but on the same ridge only some 200m away from the Oppidum de Nages
- Oppidum de la Liquière, above the hamlet of Sinsans, in the commune of Calvisson;
- Oppidum de la Font du Coucou above Calvisson;
- Oppidum du Roc de Gachonne above Calvisson;
- Oppidum de Mauressip or "Mouressipe", in the commune of Saint-Côme-et-Maruéjols.

== Archaeology ==
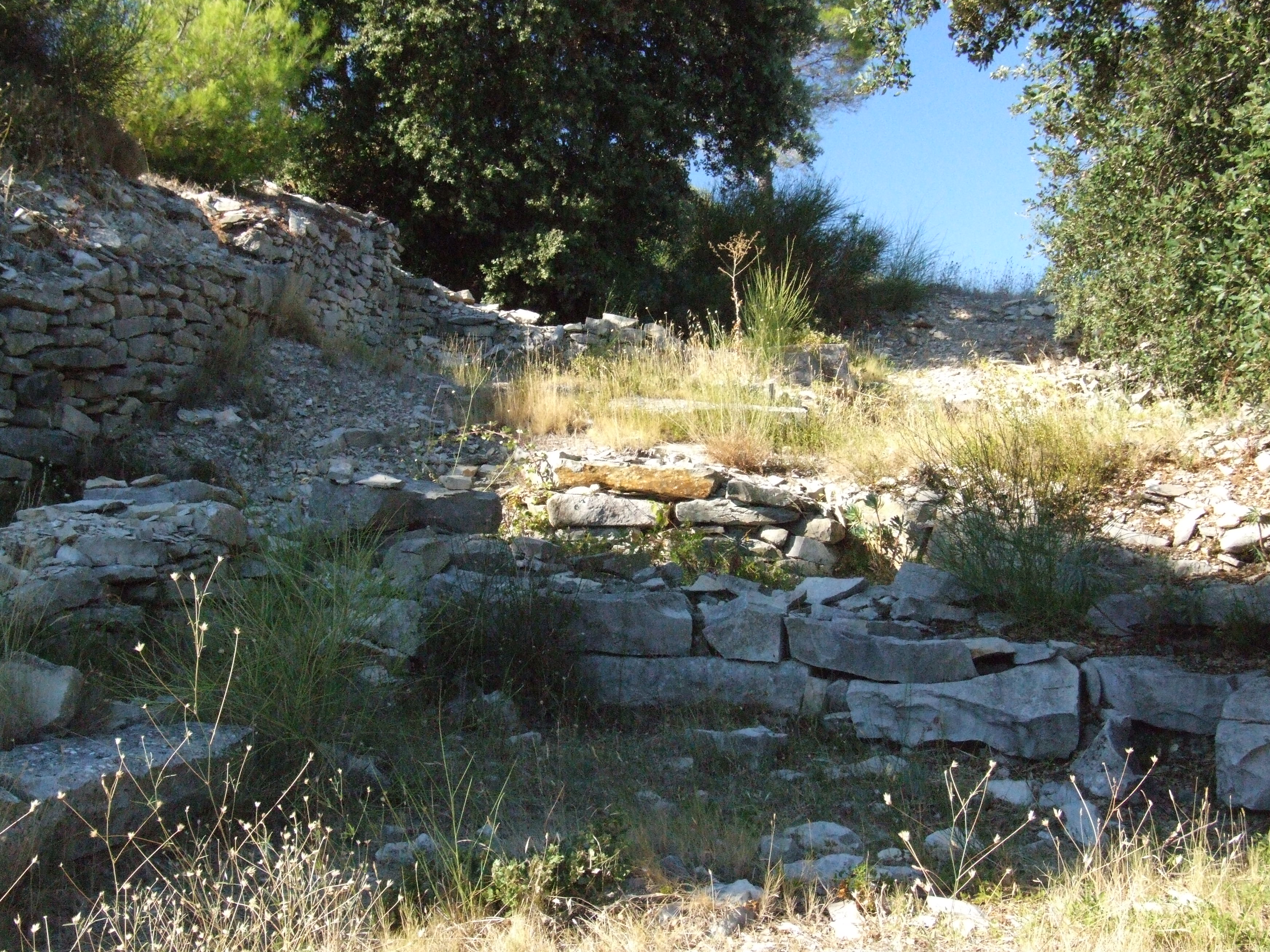
The fanum.

Three stages of occupation can be detected. The Volques first occupied the Oppidum de Roque de Viou about 700 BCE, and left around 600. They reoccupied about 400BCE, then about 280 BCE moved into the larger Oppidum des Castel but abandoned it about 50 BCE moving into the Gallo-Roman settlement of Nemausis (Nimes). There was further occupation of the Roque de Viou also round 50BCE. The oppidium contained public buildings, roads, houses, shops, and a fanum (Gaulish temple). Due its proximity to the Oppidum des Castel, non-specialists often call both oppida, the Oppidum de Nages.

== Bibliography ==
Michel Py, L'oppidum des Castels, à Nages (Gard), fouilles de 1958-1974, 35e supplément à Gallia, 1978, CNRS, Paris (355p.).
Garmy, Pierre, L'Oppidum protohistorique de Roque de Viou, 1974, published by l'Association pour la recherche archeologique en Languedoc oriental A.R.A.L.O., [Caveirac] (Mairie de Caveirac, 30820) b
