= Oppidum de Nages =

Iron Age settlement in Occitanie, France

Coordinates: 43°47′43″N 4°13′37″E

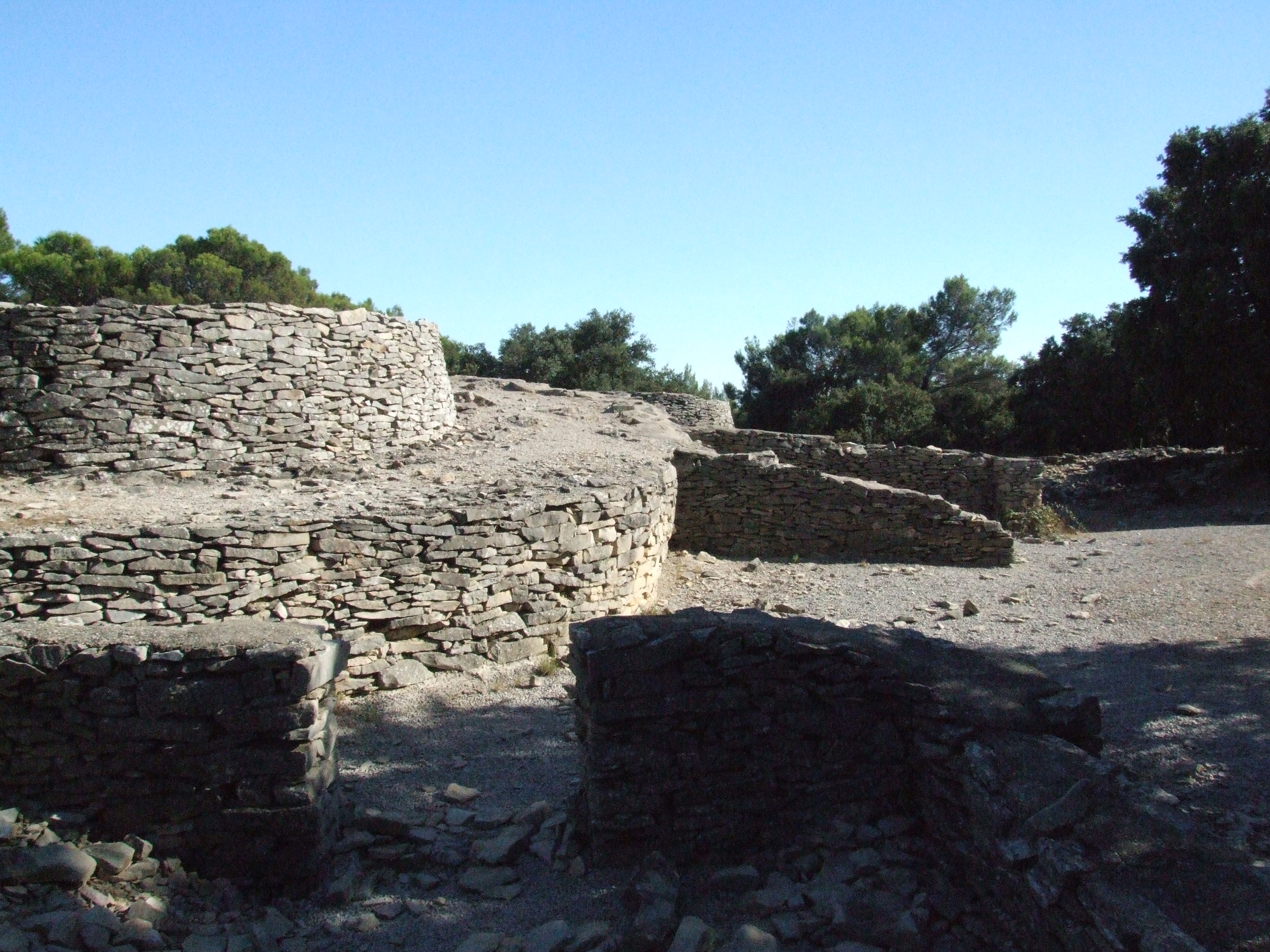
Reconstruction at the Oppidum des Castel/Oppidum de Nages

The Oppidum de Nages or Oppidum des Castels is on a hilltop overlooking the valley called the Vaunage, above the village of Nages-et-Solorgues, in Gard, between Nîmes et Sommières, in Occitanie, France. It is one of six iron-age oppida in the Vaunage, occupied between 800 BCE and 50 BCE. It has been listed since 1980 as a monument historique by the French Ministry of Culture.

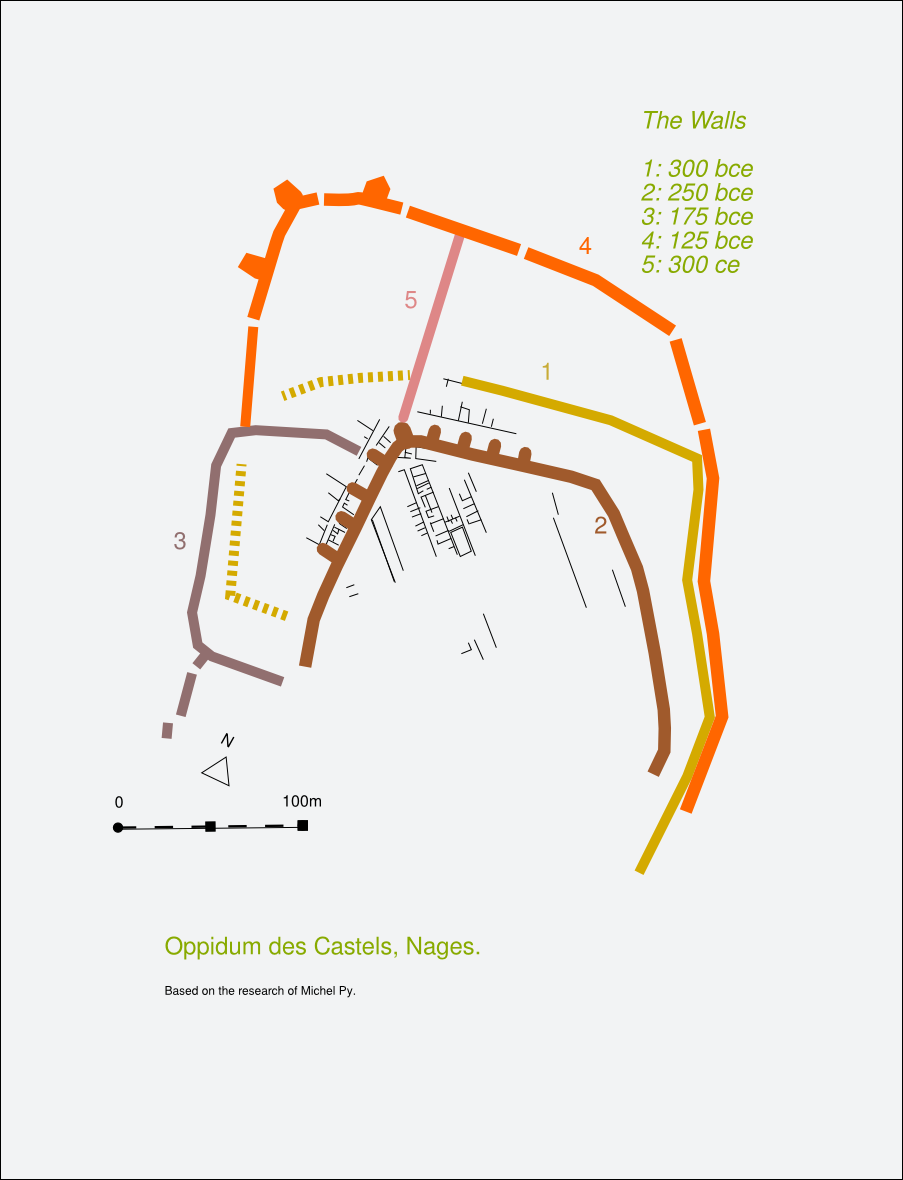

== History ==
The name Vaunages is a contraction of "Vallée de Nages", the valley of Nages, which is a furrowed combe at the edge of the garrigues plateau, surrounded by 200m-high hills that isolate it from the surroundings. There are two natural entrances, one to east coming from Nîmes, and one to the south towards Vergèze. As the name suggests Nages, and the hill behind play a dominant rôle in the area. There are hundreds of archaeological sites in the Vaunage. However it is the oppidum of Nages that has provided the richest archeological finds.

These valleys have been populated for over 2,000 years. Six oppida, dominated by that at Nages, were home to the Volques Arécomiques, who built them in the 8th century BC and remained there till the 1st century AD :

- Oppidum de Nages in the commune of Nages-et-Solorgues;
- Oppidum de Roque de Viou, an earlier settlement in the commune of Saint-Dionizy but on the same ridge only some 200m away from the Oppidum de Nages
- Oppidum de la Liquière, above the hamlet of Sinsans, in the commune of Calvisson;
- Oppidum de la Font du Coucou above Calvisson;
- Oppidum du Roc de Gachonne above Calvisson;
- Oppidum de Mauressip or "Mouressipe", in the commune of Saint-Côme-et-Maruéjols.

== Archaeology ==
The site was excavated and then partially restored, between 1958 and 1974 by the French archaeologist Michel Py. Four stages of construction can be detected. The Volques first occupied the neighbouring Oppidum de Roque de Viou, then about 300 BCE moved into the larger Oppidum des Castel but abandoned it about 50 BCE moving into the Gallo-Roman settlement of Nemausis (Nimes). The oppidium contained public buildings, roads, houses and shops a fanum(Gaulish temple).
