= Vaunage =

Area of southern France

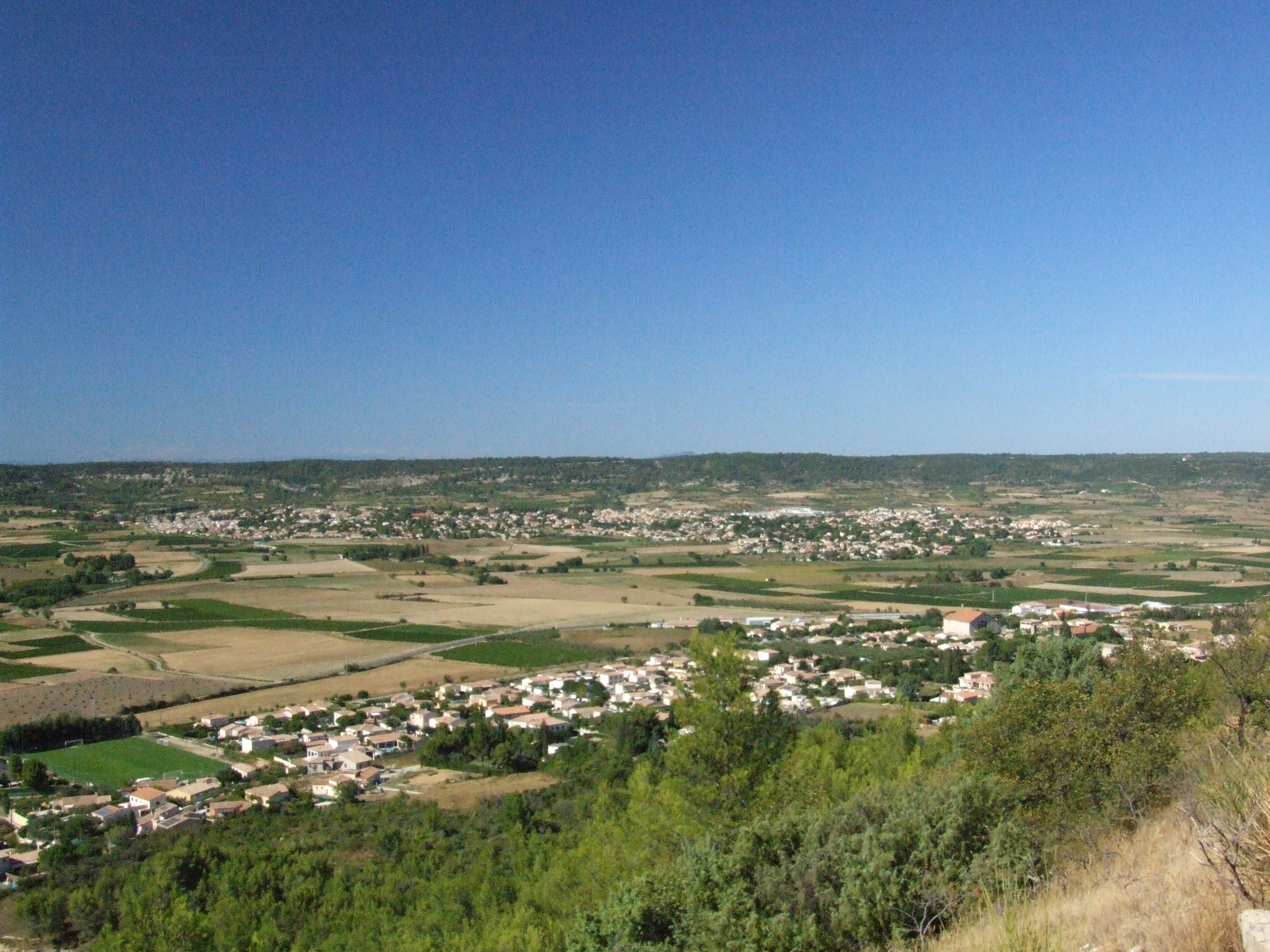
Panorama on the Vaunage from the central oppidum of Nages.

The Vaunage (Occitan: Vaunatge) is an area of southern France made up of the plain and the small hills around Nages, which is known for its Gallic oppidum. The Vaunage area is located between Languedoc and Provence and between Sommières and Nîmes. It is north of the Camargue. From east to west the villages of Vaunage are: Caveirac, Clarensac, Langlade, Saint-Dionizy, Nages-et-Solorgues, Calvisson, Boissières, Saint-Côme-et-Maruéjols, Congénies.

== Demography ==
According to the 1999 census, The population of the Vaunage was 15,250, the area being 9981 ha.

- Boissières : 485 area 333 ha
- Calvisson : 4725 area 2897 ha
- Caveirac : 3860 area 1479 ha
- Clarensac : 3117 area 1449 ha
- Congénies : 1672 area 864 ha
- Langlade : 2850 area 900 ha
- Nages-et-Solorgues : 1150 area 18 ha
- Saint-Côme-et-Maruéjols : 580 area 1400 ha
- Saint-Dionizy : 1050 area 641 ha

== History ==
The name is a contraction of "Vallée de Nages", the valley of Nages. The valley is a furrowed combe at the edge of the garrigues plateau, surrounded by 200m-high hills that isolate it from the surroundings. There are two natural entrances, one to east coming from Nîmes, and one to the south towards Vergèze.

This geographical situation has led to a strong regional identity.

Le Camisard chief, Jean Cavalier called it "petite Chanaan", little Canaan.

This is an agricultural region, rich in history. There are hundreds of archaeological sites in this small area.

These valleys have been populated for over 2,000 years. Six oppida, dominated by that at Nages, were home to the Volques, who built them in the 8th century BC and remained there till the 1st century AD :

- Oppidum de Nages-et-Solorgues; in the commune of the same name;
- Oppidum de Roque de Viou, in the commune of Saint-Dionizy;
- Oppidum de la Liquière, above the hamlet of Sinsans, in the commune of Calvisson;
- Oppidum de la Font du Coucou above Calvisson;
- Oppidum du Roc de Gachonne above Calvisson;
- Oppidum de Mauressip or "Mouressipe", in the commune of Saint-Côme-et-Maruéjols.

However it is the oppidum of Nages that has provided the richest archeological finds.

This region has a strong Protestant history, and is today predominantly Protestant. Congénies is unique in France in having a Quaker Meeting House and cemetery. One finds many recent chateaux, mas and bastides. The Camargue traditions such as the running of the bulls happen in each village. The soil is argilo-calcaire so the flora is essentially that of the garrigue- and this leads to fine wines. However, the region is being targeted by the expanding housing needs of Nîmes. The former railway has been transformed into a cycle way,«voie verte» opening the Vaunage to Green Tourism.

== Literature ==
Cartulaire de Nîmes (en 955, occitan, cited by Idebert Exbrayat, in Si la Vaunage m'était contée, Nouvelle Édition, 1992) :

Sé la Vaunagea éro un moton,
Sant Comé en sérié lou rognon.
E poudés passa dés partot,
Sant Donisé en sérié la flou.
(If the Vaunage were a sheep,
Saint Côme would be the Kidney.
And you could pass throughout,
Saint Dionisy would be the flower.)

Poème sur la Vaunage (Voyage autour de la Vaunage de Maurice Aliger, membre de l'Académie de Nîmes. Page 30. Imprimerie BENE. 1983) :

Généreuse et opulente Vaunage,
triplement riche
du fruit de l'olivier,
de vins ensoleillés
et de blonds chasselas;

Generous and opulent Vaunage, three times rich
its olives
its sunbaked red wines
and fair chasselas

== Personalities ==
- Christine Majolier
- Tony Dombre
- Maurice Aliger

== Sources ==
- Les Oppida de la Vaunage, du VIII^{e} au III^{e} siècle avant JC. Dossier réalisé par Geneviève Paillet, Hélène Peyre, Ghislaine Richard, sous la dir. de Maryse Clary, avec l'aide scientifique de Michel Py, Editions CNDP, Nîmes, 1986, ISBN 90-376-0431-5.
