= Calvisson =

Commune in Occitanie, France

- Commune
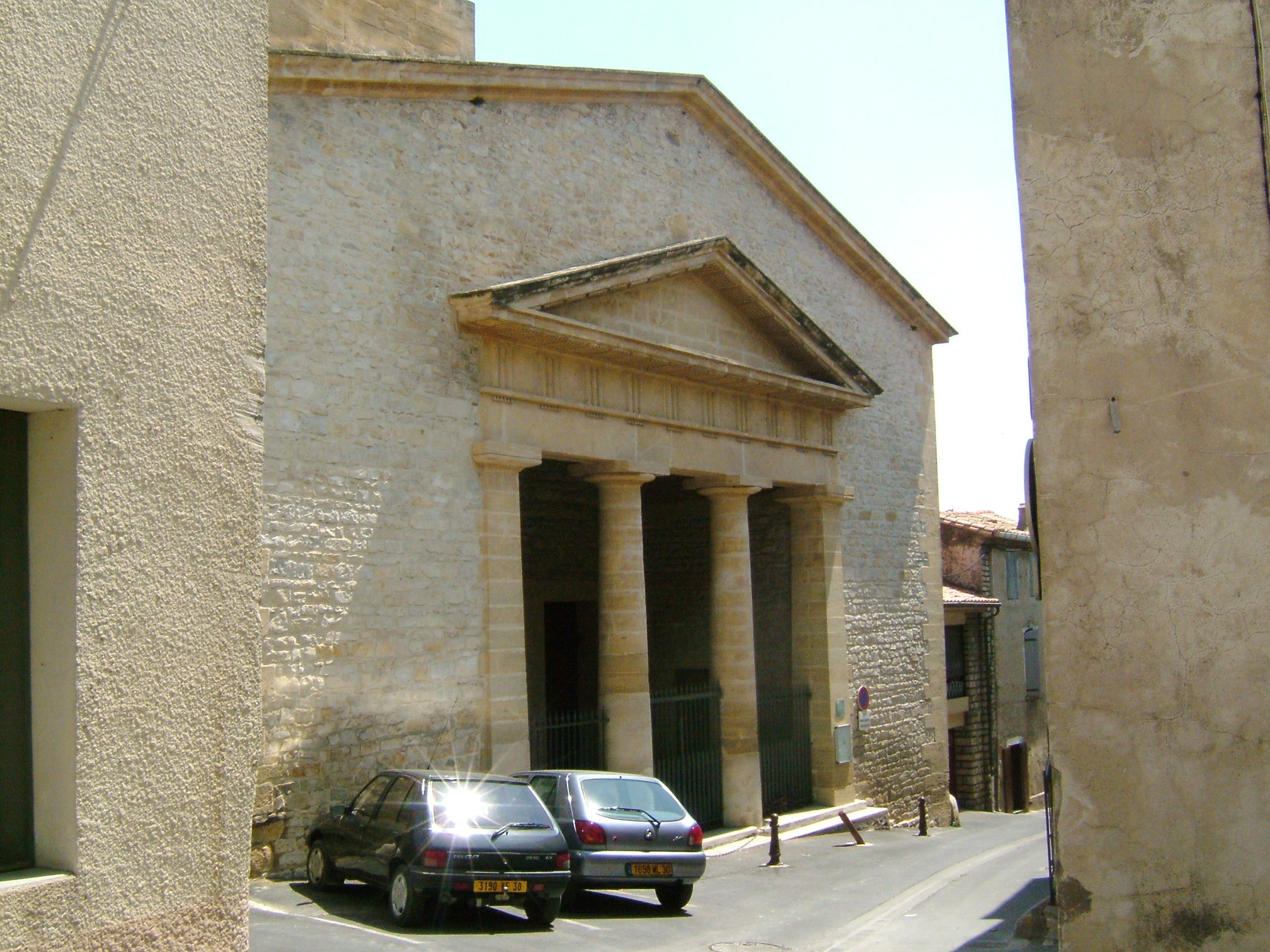
- The 19th-century neo-classical fronted temple

- Coat of arms
- Location of Calvisson
- Location within France Location within Occitanie
- Coordinates: 43°47′09″N 4°11′34″E
- Country: France
- Region: Occitania
- Department: Gard
- Arrondissement: Nîmes
- Canton: Calvisson
- Intercommunality: Pays de Sommières

Government
  - Mayor (2020–2026): André Sauzède
- Area^{1}: 28.97 km^{2} (11.19 sq mi)
- Elevation: 50 m (160 ft)
- Highest elevation: 215 m (705 ft)
- Lowest elevation: 23 m (75 ft)
- Population (2023): 6,486
  - Density: 223.9/km^{2} (579.9/sq mi)
- Time zone: UTC+01:00 (CET)
  - Summer (DST): UTC+02:00 (CEST)
- INSEE/Postal code: 30062 /30420
- ^{1} French Land Register data, which excludes lakes, ponds, glaciers > 1 km^{2} (0.386 sq mi or 247 acres) and river estuaries.

Calvisson (French pronunciation: [kalvisɔ̃]; Provençal: Cauviçon) is a commune in the Gard department in the Occitanie region in southern France.

It lies between Nîmes, Montpellier, the Cevennes and the Camargue and has a strong Protestant history.

== Geography ==
Calvisson is a commune in Gard 17 km (11 mi) west of Nîmes. It is in the northern foothills of the Vaunage, a fertile valley surrounded by a rim of limestone hills rising to 200 m. The most prominent hill is the Rock of Gachone, which was the site of an important oppidum, or a fortified town, under the Romans. The natural vegetation is classic garrigue; today the valley is used for vineyards and horticulture. A tiny stream, the Escattes, flows through the village. Calvisson also includes the hamlets of Sinsans and Bizac.

== History ==
The site is known to have been settled since the Chalcolithic transition (4300–3200 BC).

In 1060, at the time of the domination of Counts de Toulouse, the name Calvisson appears for the first time. At the time, it was a fortified town surmounted by two towers which covered 2000 m^{2}. This fortified town controlled all of the Vaunage. In 1304 King Philip IV of France gave to Guillaume de Nogaretas a fiefdom.

From the 16th century, with the beginnings of Reformation, Calvisson was divided by the wars of religion. The village becomes a centre of protestantism. In 1681, the Catholic King Louis XIV, used his troops to re-convert Protestants. On 30 June 1685, being Protestant became illegal in Nîmes. The religion moved underground, the paid pastor was replaced by the lay prophet. The wars slowly destroyed the castle which, by the middle of the 17th century is used as stone quarry.

The Camisards operated throughout the mainly protestant Cévennes region which in the early years of the eighteenth century also included the Vaunage and the parts of the Camargue around Aigues Mortes. In 1701, the village was a protestant stronghold which was occupied and then, in 1704, used as a base for the royalist troops in the battle of Nages against the protestant forces of Jean Cavalier the prophet and military leader.

In 1787, the Rock of Gachone which stands above the village is used as triangulation point by Jean-Dominique Cassini for mapping the area.

== Population ==
Historical population
Year	Pop.	±% p.a.
1968	1,802	—
1975	1,793	−0.07%
1982	2,088	+2.20%
1990	2,725	+3.38%
1999	3,597	+3.13%
2007	4,300	+2.26%
2012	5,269	+4.15%
2017	5,745	+1.74%
2023	6,486	+2.04%
Source: INSEE

== Sights ==
- The church of St Saturnin is 12th-century Romanesque and 15th-century Provençal Gothic
- the Temple is 19th-century neo-classical.
- the Rock of Gachone rises over the village to the west. There were four windmills there, three have been partially restored.

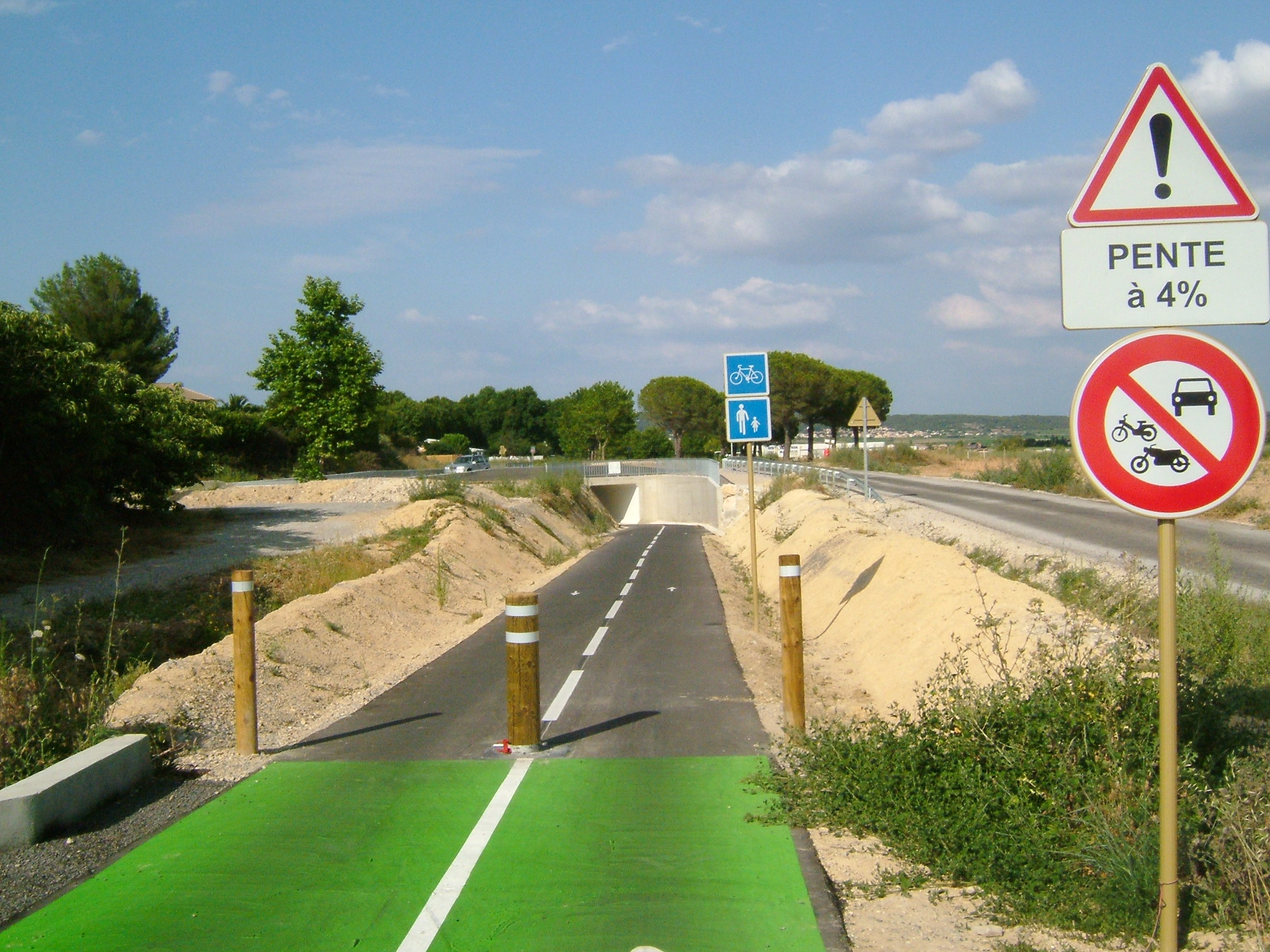
The 'Voie Verte' cycleway from Congénies as it passes under the D40.

- The beginning of the 21st century saw the old railway transformed into Voie Verte- that is a metalled cycleway through the Vaunage: from Caveirac, through Calvisson and Congénies to Junas and Sommières. This is used by horses, cycles, and pedestrians. The two major roads on the route are avoided by means of bespoke tunnels.
- Three of the four windmills for which it was known have been restored.

== Events ==
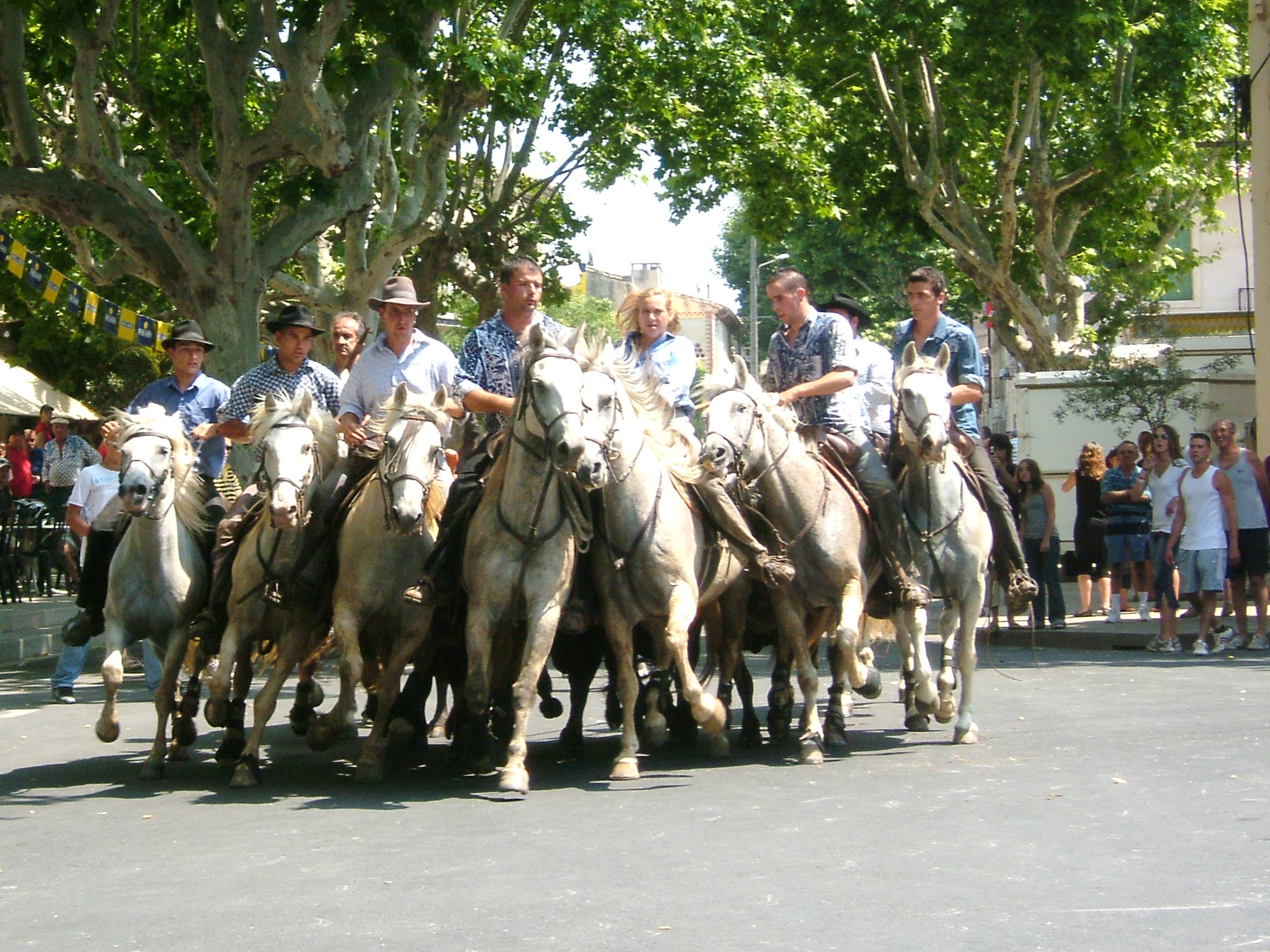
An abrivado at Calvisson. The guardians are demonstrating their skill in turn a group of at least four bulls through a 360 degree turn

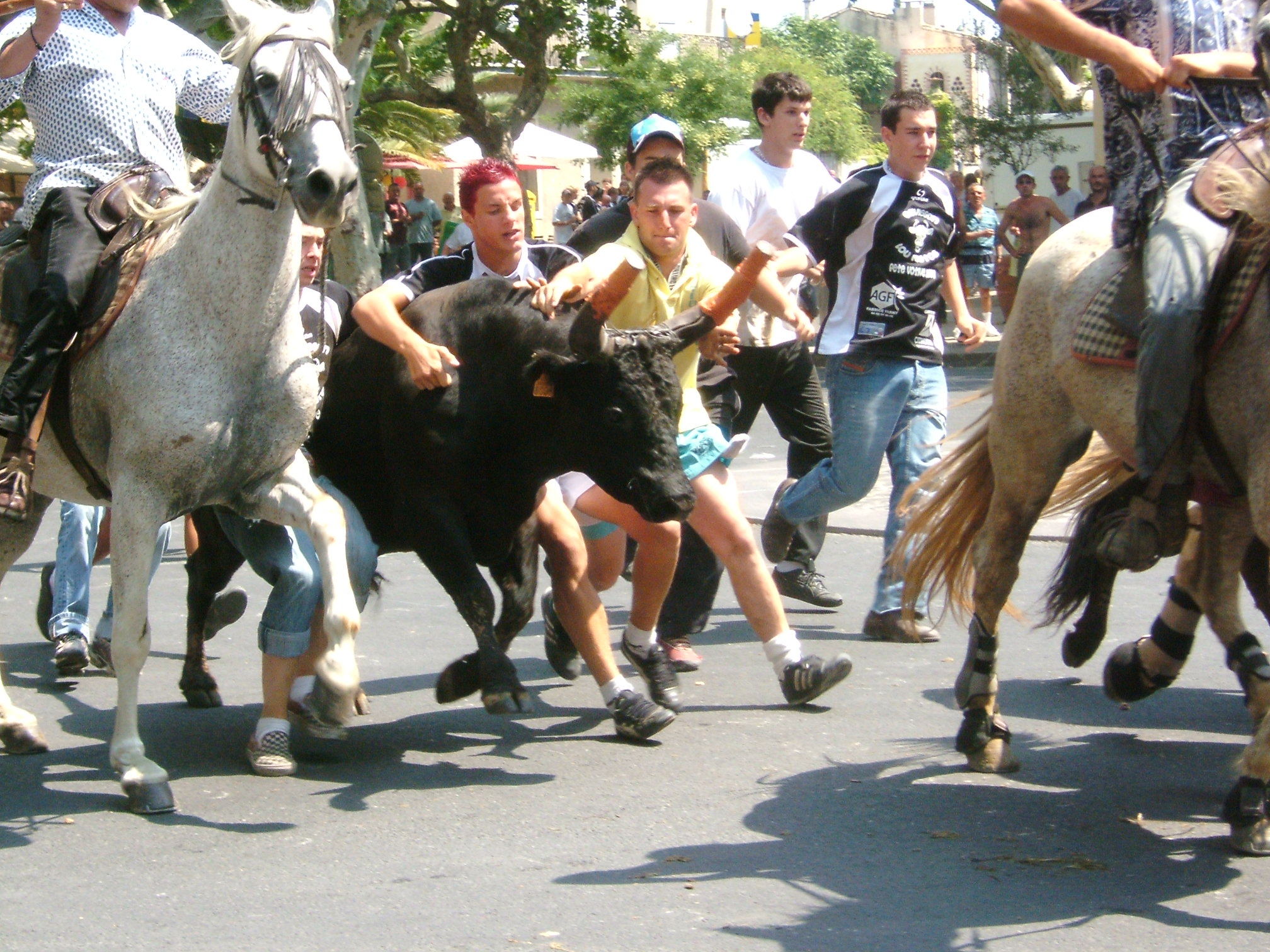
A bandido at Calvisson. Contact has been made with the bull: but it has not yet been stopped.

Bull running happens in Calvisson, according to the Carmargues tradition, where no bull gets hurt. The annual event takes place around 20 July over a period of five days. There are four events, the Abrivado where over ten bulls are run together through the street guided by a group of twelve 'guardians' mounted on white Camargues horses, an Encierro where one bull is released outside the foyer and finds his own way back to the pen, the Bandido where one bull is run accompanied through the streets, and the Bandido de nuit which is the same thing but after dark. Boys and men run with the bulls and try and separate them from the horses, stop them, and physically turn them away from the horses.

== Notable people ==
- Jean Cavalier
- Guillaume de Nogaret
- Hubert Rouger

== See also ==
- Communes of the Gard department
