= Guillaume de Nogaret =

13/14th-century French statesman

Monsieur Guillaume de Nogaret
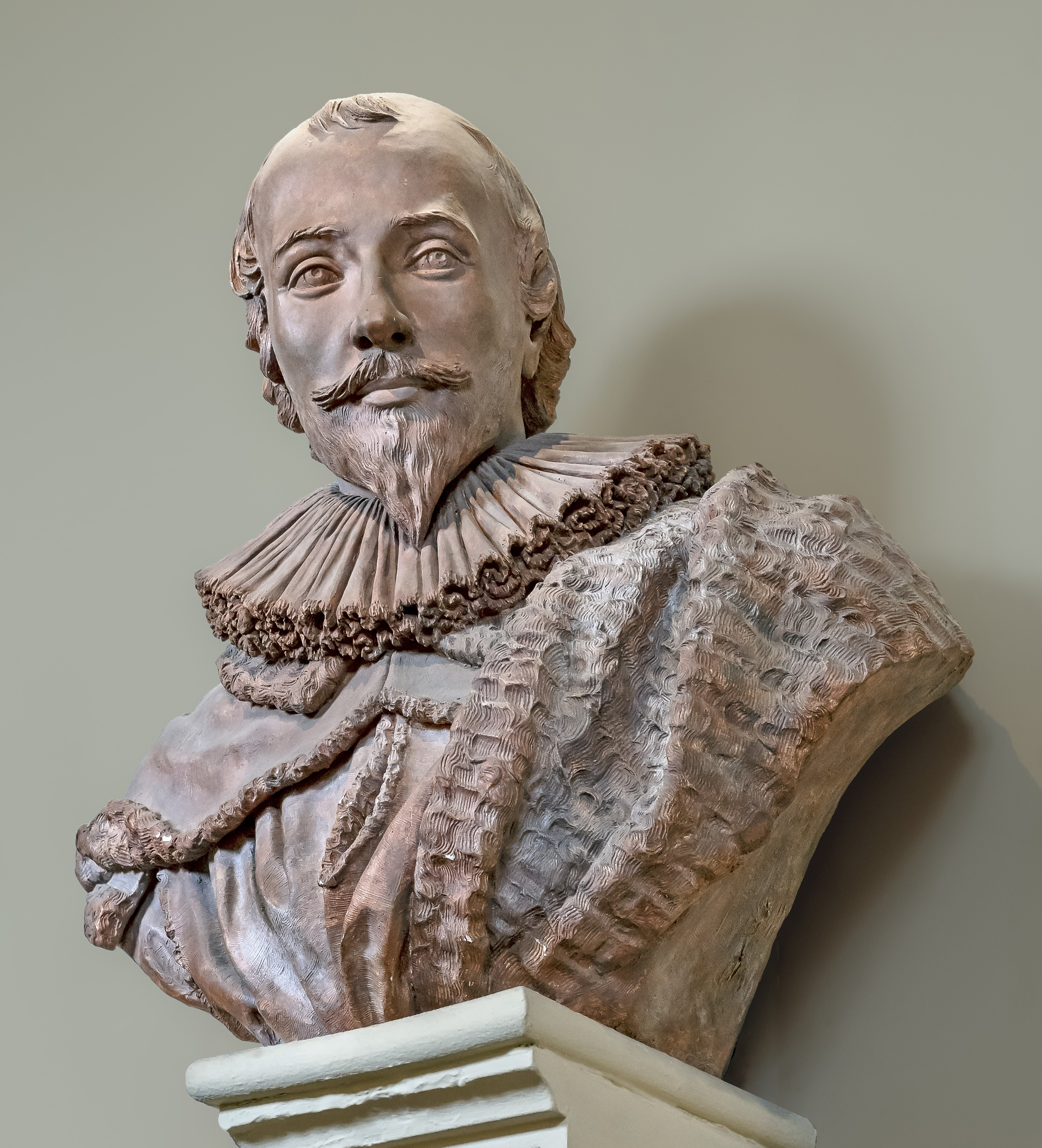
- Bust by Marc Arcis

Chancellor of France; Keeper of the Seals
- In office 1311–1313
- Monarch: Philip IV
- Preceded by: Gilles I Aycelin de Montaigu
- Succeeded by: Pierre de Latilly
- In office 1307–1310
- Preceded by: Pierre de Belleperche
- Succeeded by: Gilles I Aycelin de Montaigu

Personal details
- Born: c. 1260 Saint-Félix-Lauragais, Languedoc, France
- Died: 13 April 1313 (aged 52–53) Paris, Île-de-France, France
- Children: 1 son
- Education: University of Montpellier
- Profession: Jurist; Judge

Guillaume de Nogaret (c. 1260 – April 1313) (Note: In the first paragraph of his article, Théry states that Nogaret died a year and a half prior to Philippe le Bel, whose death is established as 29 November 1314. On page 211 of the Holtzmann book pdf, the author mentions a source indicating 1313 as the year Nogaret died. He goes on to discuss what he seems to refer to as a "poor source" being the origin of assertions that Nogaret died in 1314.) was a French statesman, councilor and keeper of the seal to Philip IV of France.

== Early life ==
Nogaret was born in Saint-Félix-Lauragais, Haute-Garonne. The family held a small ancestral property of servile origin at Nogaret, near Saint-Félix-de-Caraman (today's Saint-Félix-Lauragais), from which it took its name. In 1291 Guillaume was professor of jurisprudence at the university of Montpellier, and in 1296 he became a member of the Curia Regis at Paris. From 1306, he was a seigneur of Marsillargues, Calvisson, Aujargues and Congénies in Languedoc.

== Councilor to Philip IV ==
His name is mainly connected with the quarrel between Philip IV and Pope Boniface VIII. In 1300 he was sent with an embassy to Boniface, of which he left a picturesque and highly coloured account. His influence over the king dates from February 1303, when he persuaded Philip to consent to the bold plan of seizing Boniface and bringing him forcibly from Italy to a council in France meant to depose him. On 7 March he received, with three others, a secret commission from the royal chancery to "go to certain places ... and make such treaties with such persons as seemed good to them." On 12 March a solemn royal assembly was held in the Louvre, at which Guillaume de Nogaret read a long series of accusations against Boniface and demanded the calling of a general council to try him.

== Attack on the Pope ==
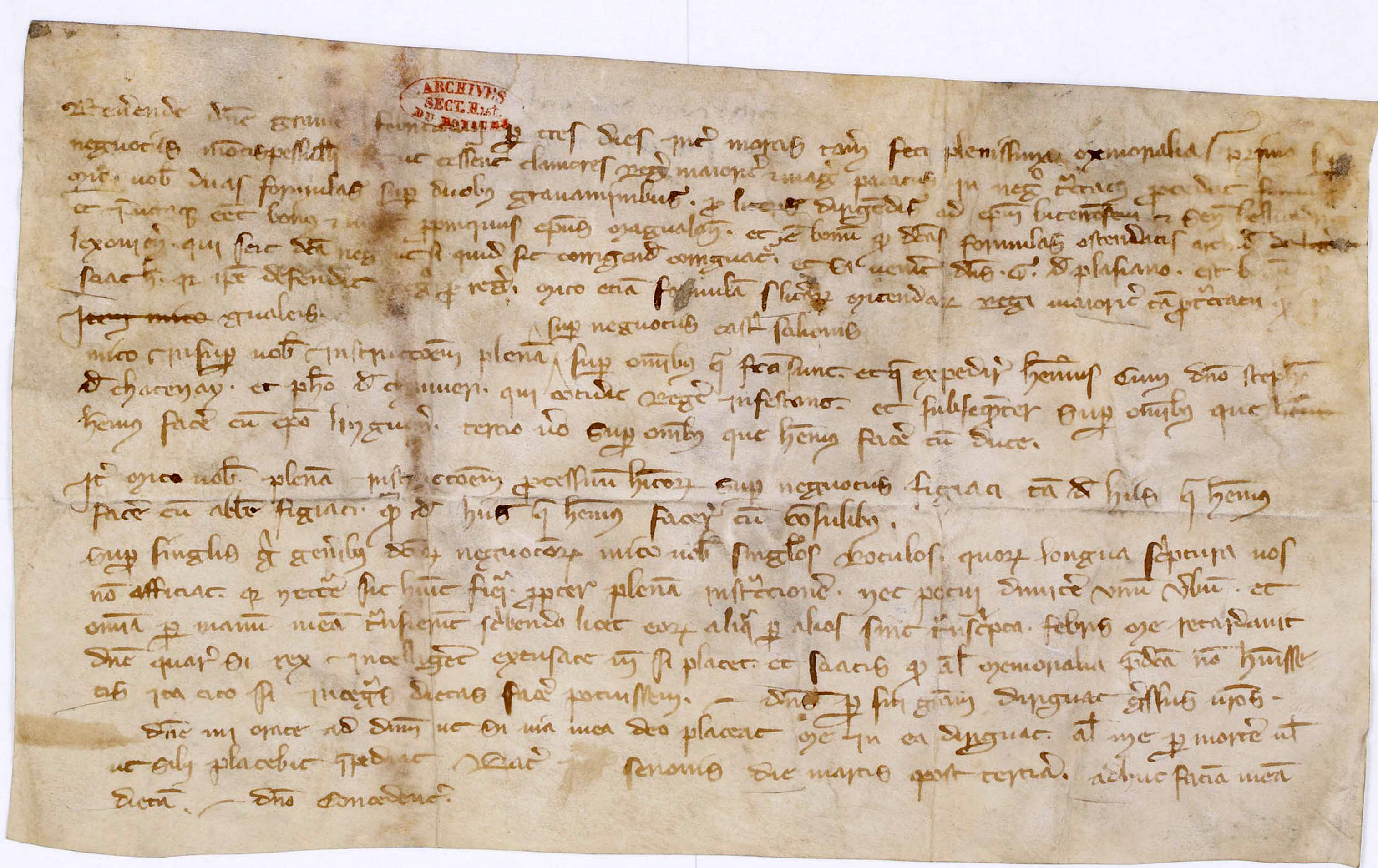
Autograph letter from Guillaume

Soon afterwards he went to Italy. By the aid of a Florentine spy, Nogaret gathered a band of adventurers and of enemies of the Caetani (Boniface's family) in the Apennines. The great Colonna house, in a bitter feud with the Caetani, was his strongest ally, and Sciarra Colonna accompanied Nogaret to Anagni, Boniface's birthplace. On 7 September, with their band of some sixteen hundred men, Nogaret and Colonna surprised the little town. The army attacked Boniface at his Palace in Anagni next to the cathedral. The Pope responded with a bull dated 8 September 1303, in which Philip and Nogaret were excommunicated. Boniface was taken prisoner. Sciarra wished to kill him, but Nogaret's policy was to take him to France and compel him to summon a general council. The French Chancellor and the Colonnas demanded the Pope's resignation; Boniface VIII responded that he would "sooner die". In response, Colonna allegedly slapped Boniface, a "slap" historically remembered as the schiaffo di Anagni ("Anagni slap").

The tide soon turned, however. On the 9th a concerted rising of the townsmen in support of Boniface put Nogaret and his allies to flight, and the pope was free. His death at Rome on 11 October saved Nogaret. The election of the timid Benedict XI was the beginning of the triumph of France that lasted through the Avignon captivity. Early in 1304 Nogaret went to Languedoc to report to Philip IV, and was rewarded by gifts of land and money. Then he was sent back with an embassy to Benedict XI to demand absolution for all concerned in the struggle with Boniface VIII. Benedict refused to meet Nogaret, excepted him from the general absolution he granted on 12 May 1304, and on 7 June issued against him and his associates at Anagni the bull Flagitiosum scelus. Nogaret replied with apologies for his conduct, and when Benedict died on 7 July 1304 Nogaret pointed to his death as a witness to the justice of his cause.

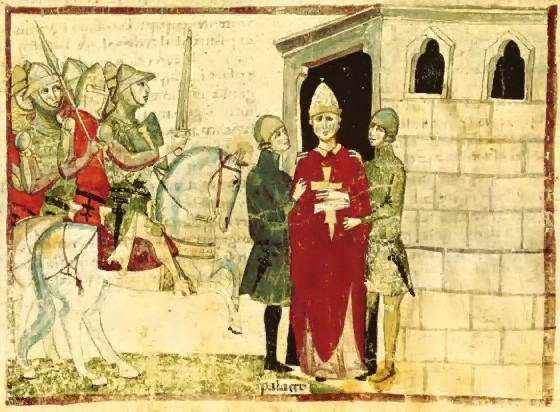
Guillaume de Nogaret and Sciarra Colonna capture Pope Boniface VIII. (Depiction from the Nuova Cronica by Giovanni Villani, 14th century)

French influence led to a Frenchman, Bertrand de Got (Clement V), being elected as Benedict's successor. The threat of proceedings against the memory of Boniface was renewed to force Clement to absolve Nogaret, and Clement had given way on this point when the further question of an inquiry into the condition of the Knights Templar was brought forward by Philip as a preliminary to their arrest and the seizure of their property in October 1307. Nogaret was active in getting the renegade members of the order to give evidence against their fellows, and the proceedings against them bear traces of his unscrupulous and merciless pen. Clement's weak and ineffective resistance to this still further delayed the agreement between him and Philip. Nogaret had become keeper of the seal that year in succession to Pierre de Belleperche.

His talents as an advocatus diaboli were given still further employment in the trial of Guichard, bishop of Troyes, charged with various crimes, including witchcraft and unchastity. The trial, which began in 1308 and lasted until 1313, was a hint to Clement as to what might happen if the oft-repeated threat of a trial of Boniface were carried out. Absolution was obtained from Clement on 27 April 1311. Guillaume de Nogaret was to go on the next crusade and visit certain places of pilgrimage in France and Spain as a penance, but never did so. He died in April 1313. He retained the seals until his death and was occupied with the king's affairs concerning Flanders as late as the end of March 1313.

== Literature ==
Nogaret is a character in Les Rois maudits (The Accursed Kings), a series of historical novels by Maurice Druon, as one of the three characters (alongside King Philip IV and Pope Clement V) denounced by Jacques de Molay and called to "the tribunal of heaven" before the end of the year at the latter's execution, in March 1314. In reality, Nogaret died the preceding year, before de Molay and any such possible condemnation. The novels were adapted into a television miniseries in 1972 and again in 2005, in which Nogaret was played by actors Jacques Goasguen and Jérôme Anger, respectively.

== Sources ==
- Elizabeth A. R. Brown, "Philip the Fair and His Ministers: Guillaume de Nogaret and Enguerran de Marigny", in The Capetian Century, 1214–1314, ed. by William Chester Jordan, Jenna Rebecca Phillips, Turnhout, Brepols, 2017, pp. 185–218.
- (in French) Elizabeth A. R. Brown, "Veritas à la cour de Philippe le Bel de France: Pierre Dubois, Guillaume de Nogaret et Marguerite Porete', in La vérité. Vérité et crédibilité: construire la vérité dans le système de communication de l'Occident (XIIIe-XVIIe siècle), ed. by J.-P. Genet, Paris, Publications de la Sorbonne, 2016, pp. 425–445, online.
- Elizabeth A. R. Brown, " The Faith of Guillaume de Nogaret, His Excommunication, and the Fall of the Knights Templar ", dans Cristo e il potere. Teologia, antropologia e politica, dir. Laura Andreani, Agostino Paravicini Bagliani, Florence, Sismel-Edizioni del Galluzzo, 2017, pp. 157–181.
- (in German) Robert Holtzmann, Wilhelm von Nogaret. Rat und Grosssiegelbewahrer Philipps des Schönen von Frankreich, Freiburg-im-Breisgau, 189, Online.
- (in French) Sébastien Nadiras, Guillaume de Nogaret et la pratique du pouvoir, thesis of the École des chartes, 2003.
- Franklin J. Pegues, The Lawyers of the Last Capetians, Princeton, 1962.
- Ernest Renan, Guillaume de Nogaret, dans Histoire littéraire de la France, t. XXVII, p. 233–371.
- (in French) Bernard Moreau, dir., Guillaume de Nogaret, un languedocien au service de la monarchie capétienne. Actes du colloque de Nîmes, 20 janvier 2012, Nîmes, Lucie Éditions, 2012 ISBN 978-2-35371-293-9.
- (in French) Bernard Moreau, Julien Théry-Astruc, ed., La royauté capétienne et le Midi au temps de Guillaume de Nogaret. Actes du colloque des 29 et 30 novembre 2013, Nîmes, Éditions de la Fenestrelle, 2015 ISBN 979-10-92826-34-0.
- Julien Théry, "Philip the Fair, the Trial of the 'Perfidious Templars' and the Pontificalization of the French Monarchy", in Journal of Medieval Religious Culture, 39/2 (2013), pp. 117–148, online
- J.Théry-Astruc, "The Pioneer of Royal Theocracy. Guillaume de Nogaret and the conflicts between Philip the Fair and the Papacy", in The Capetian Century, 1214–1314, ed. by William Chester Jordan, Jenna Rebecca Phillips, Turnhout, Brepols, 2017, pp. 219–259.
- (in French) J.Théry-Astruc, " Negocium Christi. Guillaume de Nogaret et le christocentrisme capétien, de l'affaire Boniface VIII à l'affaire du Temple ", dans Cristo e il potere. Teologia, antropologia e politica, dir. Laura Andreani, Agostino Paravicini Bagliani, Florence, Sismel-Edizioni del Galluzzo, 2017, pp. 183–209, online.
- For the sources consult Martin Bouquet, Recueil des historiens des Gaules et de la France, vols xx.-xxiii.; Annales regis Edwardi primi in Rishanger (Rolls series), pp. 483–491, which gives the fullest account of the affair at Anagni.
