= Langlade, Gard =

Langlade
- Commune
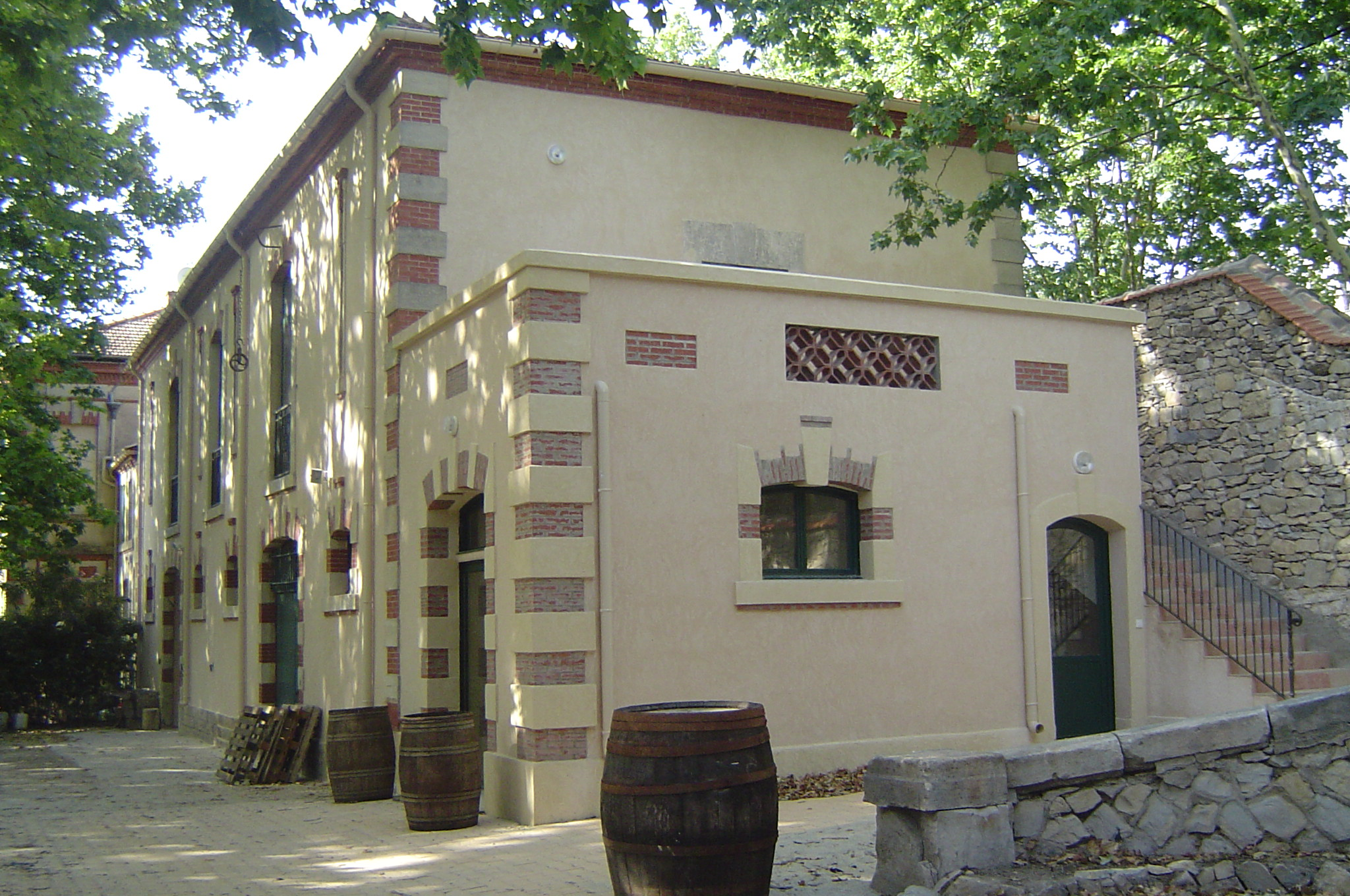
- Château Langlade winery

- Coat of arms
- Location of Langlade
- Location within France Location within Occitanie
- Coordinates: 43°48′19″N 4°15′02″E
- Country: France
- Region: Occitania
- Department: Gard
- Arrondissement: Nîmes
- Canton: Saint-Gilles
- Intercommunality: CA Nîmes Métropole

Government
  - Mayor (2020–2026): Gaëtan Prevoteau
- Area^{1}: 9 km^{2} (3.5 sq mi)
- Elevation: 90 m (300 ft)
- Highest elevation: 165 m (541 ft)
- Lowest elevation: 48 m (157 ft)
- Population (2023): 2,329
  - Density: 260/km^{2} (670/sq mi)
- Time zone: UTC+01:00 (CET)
  - Summer (DST): UTC+02:00 (CEST)
- INSEE/Postal code: 30138 /30980
- ^{1} French Land Register data, which excludes lakes, ponds, glaciers > 1 km^{2} (0.386 sq mi or 247 acres) and river estuaries.

Langlade (French pronunciation: [lɑ̃ɡlad]; Occitan: L'Anglada) is a commune and a village in the Gard department in southern France located some 15 km (9.3 mi) southwest of Nîmes. The village is situated in an area of low hills and plains known as the Vaunage and has existed since at least 1125. It was built near to a Roman road and had a small church at its centre. In the 17th century a staging point was set up on the Roman road nearby and later a station was built in the village on the railway line connecting Nîmes to Roquefort. The station closed in 1987. Much of the local area is devoted to the cultivation of grapes. From a hamlet with fewer than 400 inhabitants in the 1960s, the village has grown considerably, so that by 2023 it had 2,329 inhabitants.

== History ==
First mentioned in 1125 as Anglata (meaning "angle" or "corner"), its early inhabitants appear to have been attracted by the plain just below the nearby Roman road between Nîmes and Sommières (the Via Domitia) where there were opportunities for growing cereals and raising sheep. A small community grew up around St Julian's Church (Église Saint Julien), documented in 1149 as having a presbytery, a hospital and a cemetery. At the time, the village took the form of a narrow rectangle protected by stone walls.

During the wars between the Protestants and the Catholics in the 16th and 17th centuries, the church was partly destroyed. Even after the revocation of the Edict of Nantes in 1685, many of the villagers continued secretly to observe the Protestant faith. In the 17th century, a staging post was established close to the village on the Roman road. In the early 19th century, with the establishment of the National Reformed Church, the village church became Protestant. In about 1850, a new building was erected to house the town hall on the first floor and a school on the ground floor. Langlade was connected to Nîmes by railway in 1882. In 1925, the Place du Visago was laid out at the eastern end of the original rectangle. Passenger traffic on the railway was terminated in 1970 and the railway was closed in 1987. In 2001, the new church of St Julian was built.

== Geography ==
Langlade is located in Vaunage, an area of plains and low hills between Languedoc and Provence. The name is a contraction of "Vallée de Nages" and it occupies a depression between the 200 metres (660 ft) scrub-covered hills on either side which cut it off from other areas. Although the population of the village has increased, the historic houses and streets in the centre have not been spoiled by the intrusion of modern buildings. The city of Nîmes is 15 kilometres (9.3 mi) to the north and the town of Sommières about 7 kilometres (4.3 mi) to the south.

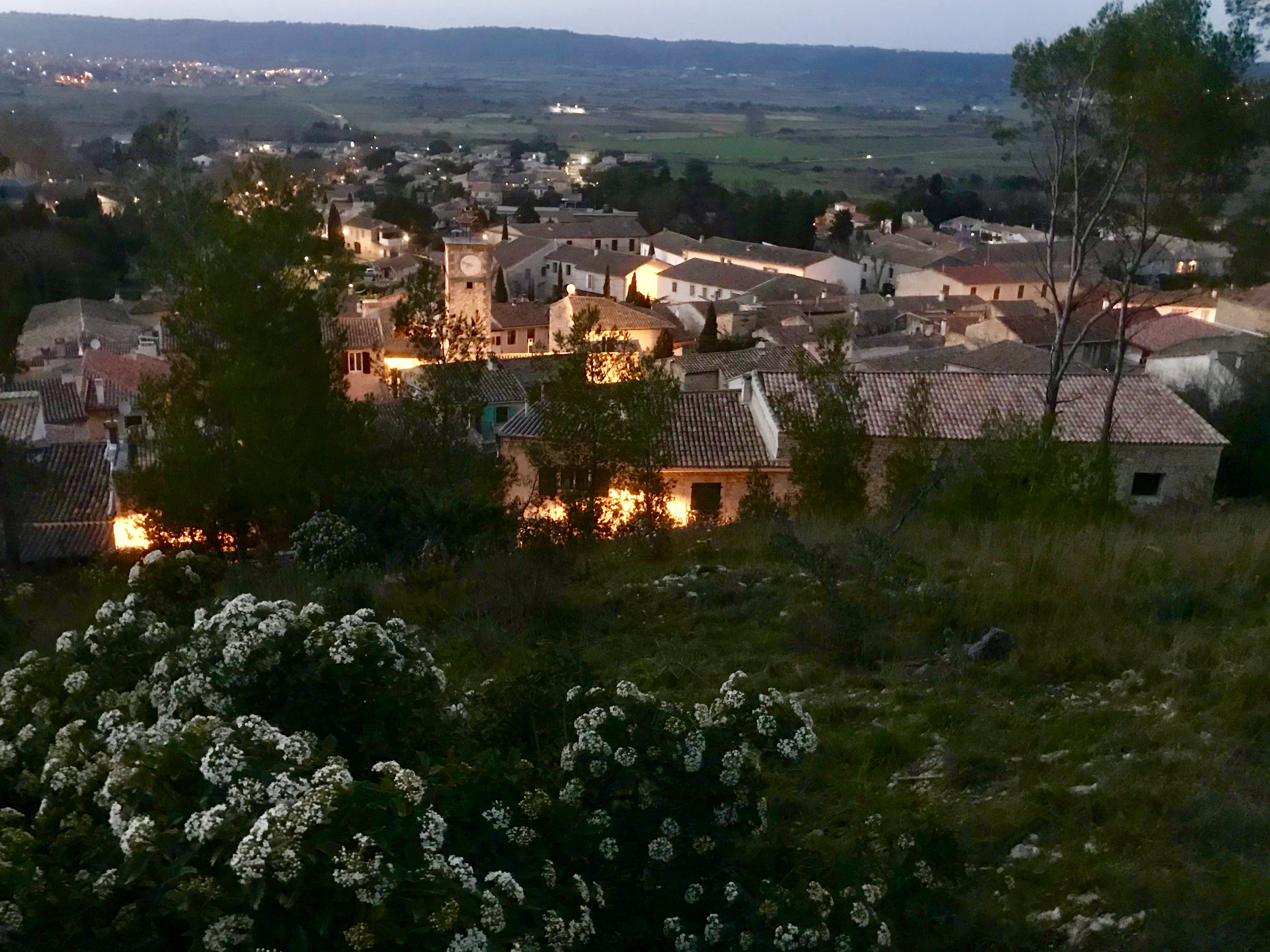
Langlade from Cavalier Windmill

== Wine production ==
With a history dating back to the Romans, Langlade has gained a name for wine production. In 1696, Louis XIV presented the village with a coat of arms (three vine stakes surmounted by a bunch of grapes on a silver background) in recognition of the court's appreciation of its wines. By 1652, vineyards had been planted over an area of 140 hectares (346 acres). At the beginning of the 19th century, low-yield vines covered 600 hectares (1,480 acres) or 70% of the community's cultivated land. After they were destroyed by phylloxera in 1876, production ceased until 1882 when Henri-David and Antoine Dombre undertook replanting and the creation of the Château Langlade label. Today the area known as the "Vieux Langlade" is once again devoted to wine production.

== Cavalier Windmill ==
The Cavalier Windmill (Moulin à vent Cavalier) is first mentioned in a promissory note written in 1211 but also appears in documents in 1597, 1634 and 1693. In 1781, it appears on the Cassini map. Its rotatable roof is supported by a cylindrical body of stone. Restored in 2004, the mill is now in full working order.

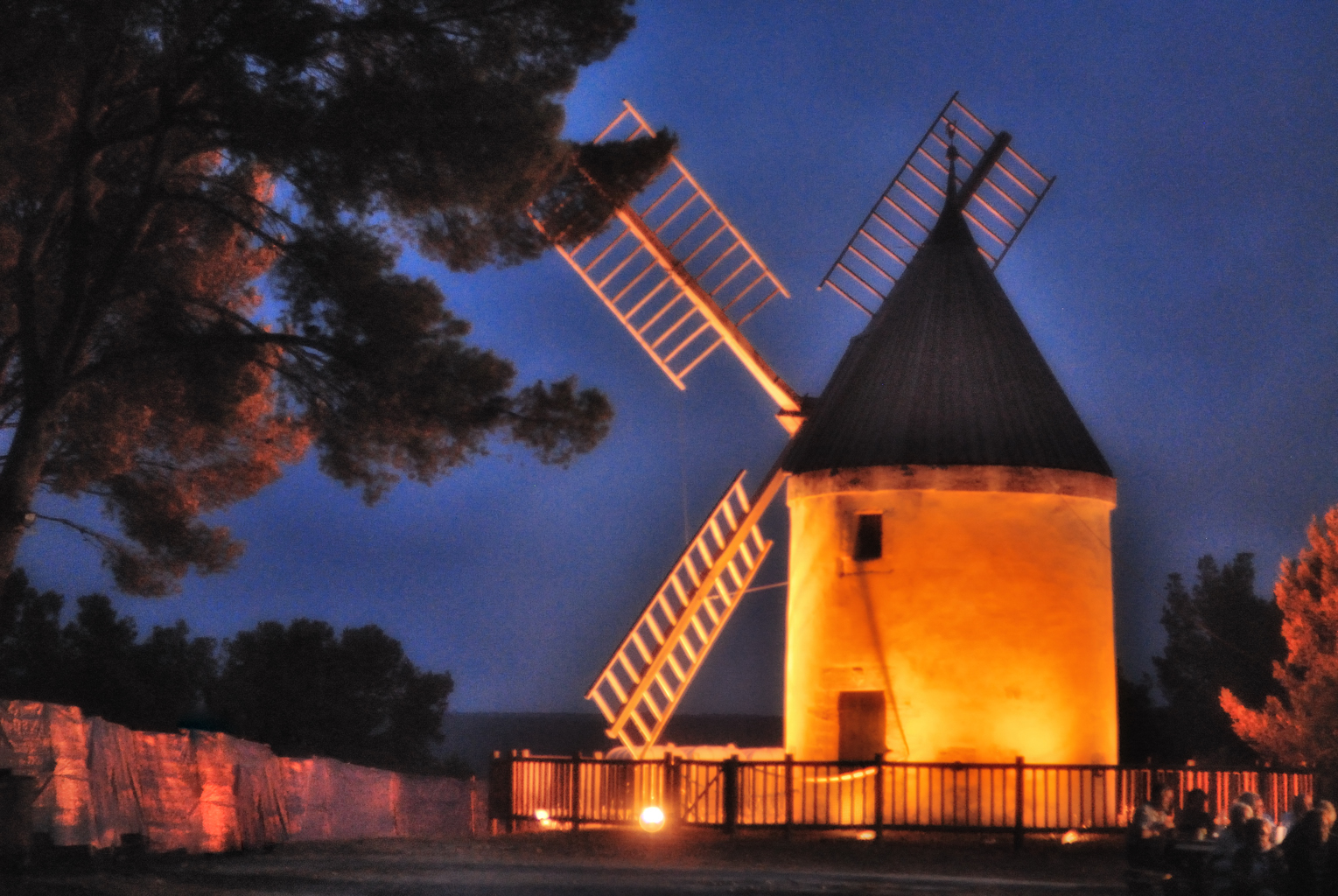
Cavalier Windmill at Langlade

== Population ==
Historical population
| Year | Pop. | ±% p.a. |
|---|---|---|
| 1968 | 381 | — |
| 1975 | 646 | +7.83% |
| 1982 | 1,193 | +9.16% |
| 1990 | 1,603 | +3.76% |
| 1999 | 1,834 | +1.51% |
| 2007 | 1,976 | +0.94% |
| 2012 | 2,075 | +0.98% |
| 2017 | 2,190 | +1.08% |
| 2023 | 2,329 | +1.03% |
Source: INSEE

== See also ==
- Communes of the Gard department
