= Caveirac =

Commune in Occitanie, France

- Commune
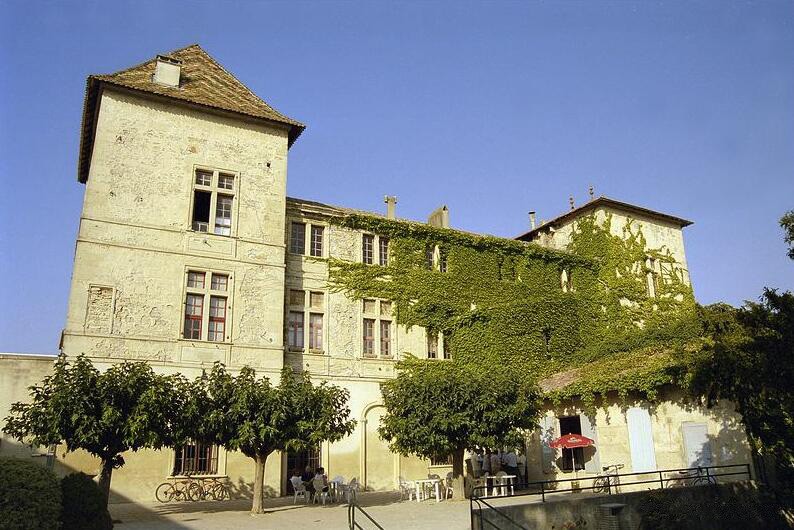
- Chateau

- Coat of arms
- Location of Caveirac
- Location within France Location within Occitanie
- Coordinates: 43°49′34″N 4°15′46″E
- Country: France
- Region: Occitania
- Department: Gard
- Arrondissement: Nîmes
- Canton: Saint-Gilles
- Intercommunality: CA Nîmes Métropole

Government
  - Mayor (2020–2026): Jean-Luc Chailan
- Area^{1}: 15.2 km^{2} (5.9 sq mi)
- Elevation: 93 m (305 ft)
- Highest elevation: 208 m (682 ft)
- Lowest elevation: 57 m (187 ft)
- Population (2023): 4,408
  - Density: 290/km^{2} (751/sq mi)
- Time zone: UTC+01:00 (CET)
  - Summer (DST): UTC+02:00 (CEST)
- INSEE/Postal code: 30075 /30820
- ^{1} French Land Register data, which excludes lakes, ponds, glaciers > 1 km^{2} (0.386 sq mi or 247 acres) and river estuaries.

Caveirac (French pronunciation: [kaveʁak]; Occitan: Cavairac) is a commune and a village in the Gard department in southern France. It is located 8 km (5 mi) west of Nîmes and is the first village in the Vaunage reached when travelling from Nîmes. Its early history is unclear but it was in existence by the year 893. Its main feature is the Chateau of Caveiric, a notable building which now houses the town hall. The surrounding area of plains and low hills is agricultural and there are extensive vineyards.

== Geography ==
Caveirac is located 8 km (5 mi) west of Nîmes and 19 km (12 mi) east of Sommières. It is the first village encountered when the fertile agricultural plain known as the Vaunage is entered from the east. Near the town is a hill, Pic Caveirac, from which the surrounding peaks of Mont Ventoux, La Grande Motte, Les Alpilles, Pic Saint Loup and Mont Aigoual can be seen.

== History ==
The name of Caveirac originates from the Gallo-Roman name of Cavarius and the Gaulish suffix -acos, together designating a property on the site of the villa which belonged to Cavarius. The site stood on a Roman road, of which a milestone excavated in the comune was purchased and installed in the paving of the square before the Château. Its name was first mentioned in 893 in an act of sale recorded by the cathedral of Nîmes: "in territorio civitatis Nemausensis in vicaria Valle Anagia in villas quas nominant…Cavariago". There are a number of traces of the early occupation of the land around Caveirac, including funeral stones and the remains of farming properties, but they are all rather vague.

In 1653, Jacques Boisson of Nîmes purchased the territory of Caveirac including the castle, houses and furnishings. In so doing, he acquired the title of Lord of Caveirac and went on to renovate the castle, completing the work in 1660. The building changed hands several times over the ensuing centuries.

From the 16th century, the local peasants extended farming and sheep rearing in the surrounding area, including the hills, despite the poor quality of the soil. In the 19th century, the village benefitted from the addition of an open-air clothes-washing lavoir and a fountain (completed in 1867). After the community had overcome the destruction of its vineyards from the effects of phylloxera, a Protestant church was completed in 1867 and a Methodist chapel in 1873.

== The castle ==
When Jacques Boisson, a rich banker, acquired the castle in 1653, he employed the architect Jean Talard from Nîmes to renovate it. Another phase of restoration and enlargement took place between 1697 and 1709 after Pierre Sartre, the receiver general of the salt tax in Languedoc, had become the owner. At this time the extensive 35-hectare park was created and walled gardens were made on both sides of the forecourt.

The castle was pillaged in 1792 at the time of the French Revolution but the buildings were left largely intact. The castle is laid out with two forward-sweeping wings. The main entrance is flanked by two guard chambers and inside there are a pair of grand staircases, marble fireplaces and a sumptuous decor with painted ceilings in the west wing. The park was subdivided and sold off around 1838.

The Novy family were owners of the castle until the beginning of the 19th century when they sold it off bit by bit to the local inhabitants. Sections were converted into a school, a Protestant place of worship and a library. The forecourt is now a public square and part of the building is used as the town hall.

== Population ==
Historical population
Year	Pop.	±% p.a.
1968	704	—
1975	1,096	+6.53%
1982	1,877	+7.99%
1990	2,679	+4.55%
1999	3,099	+1.63%
2007	3,704	+2.25%
2012	3,900	+1.04%
2017	4,181	+1.40%
2023	4,408	+0.89%
Source: INSEE

== See also ==
- Communes of the Gard department
