= Hubert Rouger =

French politician (1875–1958)

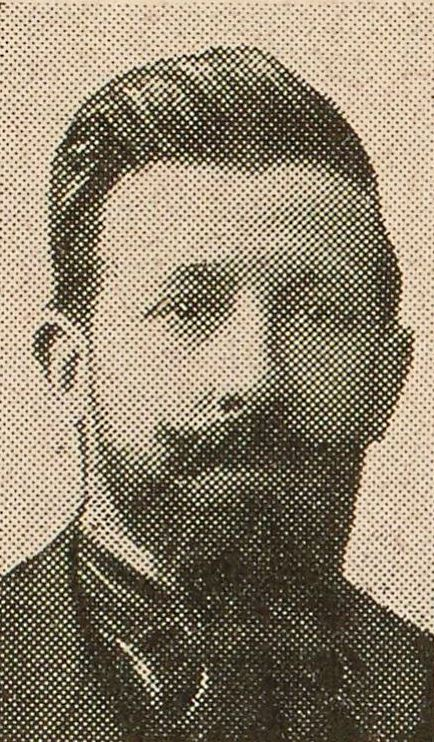
Rouger, Hubert (Henri Manuel)

Hubert Rouger (October 6, 1875, Calvisson (Gard) – 21 September 1958, Nîmes) was a French politician and socialist activist.

First a winemaker, in 1905 he became director of a printing cooperative in Nîmes. A socialist activist, he contributed to numerous newspapers and magazines.

Councilor in 1908, then Deputy in 1909, he became mayor of Nîmes from 1925 to 1940. In 1919 he was also general councillor. He served as the SFIO deputy of the Gard department from 1910 to 1919 and from 1924 to 1940. He was secretary of the House from 1924 to 1928 and Questor in 1936.

On 10 July 1940, Rouger voted in favour of granting the cabinet presided by Marshal Philippe Pétain authority to draw up a new constitution, thereby effectively ending the French Third Republic and establishing Vichy France.
