= Boissières, Gard =

Commune in Occitanie, France

Boissières
- Commune
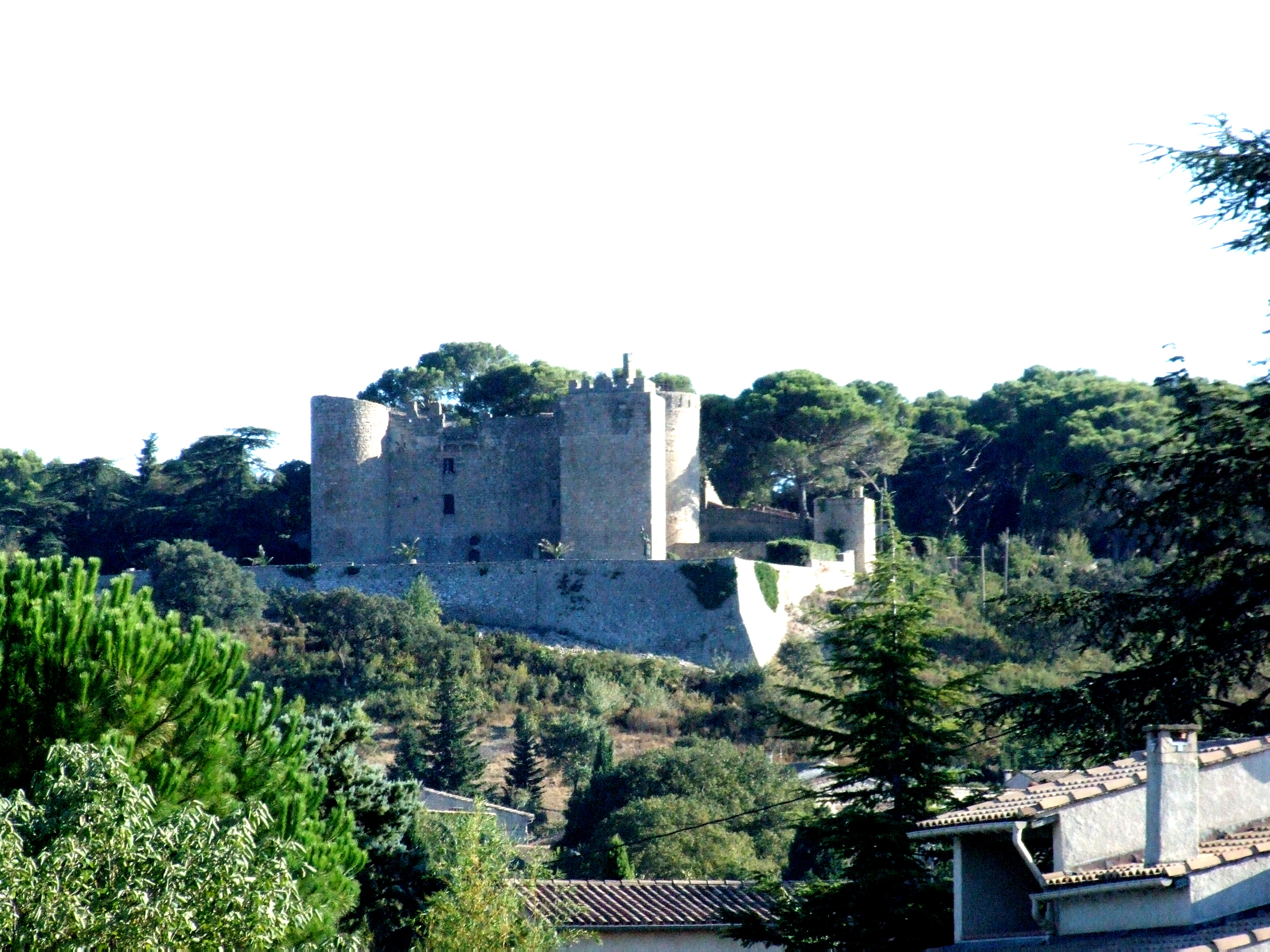
- The chateau in Boissières

- Coat of arms
- Location of Boissières
- Location within France Location within Occitanie
- Coordinates: 43°46′31″N 4°14′01″E
- Country: France
- Region: Occitania
- Department: Gard
- Arrondissement: Nîmes
- Canton: Calvisson
- Intercommunality: Rhôny Vistre Vidourle

Government
  - Mayor (2020–2026): Marc Foucon
- Area^{1}: 3.33 km^{2} (1.29 sq mi)
- Elevation: 60 m (200 ft)
- Highest elevation: 102 m (335 ft)
- Lowest elevation: 28 m (92 ft)
- Population (2023): 588
  - Density: 177/km^{2} (457/sq mi)
- Time zone: UTC+01:00 (CET)
  - Summer (DST): UTC+02:00 (CEST)
- INSEE/Postal code: 30043 /30114
- ^{1} French Land Register data, which excludes lakes, ponds, glaciers > 1 km^{2} (0.386 sq mi or 247 acres) and river estuaries.

Boissières (French pronunciation: [bwasjɛʁ]; Occitan: Boissièira) is a commune in the Gard department in southern France.

== Population ==
Historical population
Year	Pop.	±% p.a.
1968	154	—
1975	145	−0.86%
1982	305	+11.21%
1990	420	+4.08%
1999	481	+1.52%
2007	513	+0.81%
2012	520	+0.27%
2017	565	+1.67%
2023	588	+0.67%
Source: INSEE

== See also ==
- Communes of the Gard department
