= Congénies =

- Commune
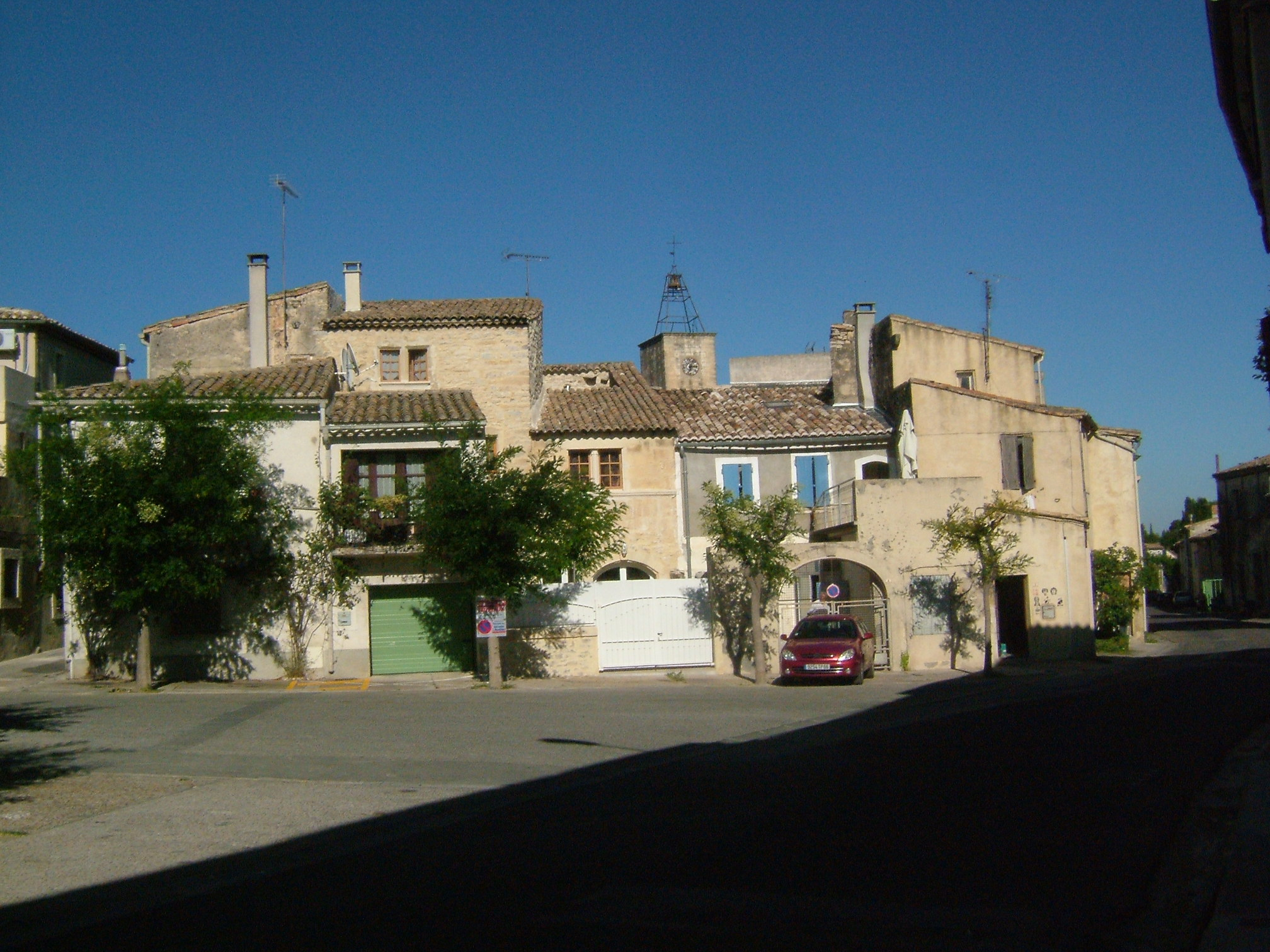
- A general view of Congénies
- Location of Congénies
- Location within France Location within Occitanie
- Coordinates: 43°46′45″N 4°09′39″E
- Country: France
- Region: Occitania
- Department: Gard
- Arrondissement: Nîmes
- Canton: Calvisson
- Intercommunality: Pays de Sommières

Government
  - Mayor (2020–2026): Fabienne Dhuisme
- Area^{1}: 8.64 km^{2} (3.34 sq mi)
- Elevation: 75 m (246 ft)
- Highest elevation: 145 m (476 ft)
- Lowest elevation: 45 m (148 ft)
- Population (2023): 1,617
  - Density: 187/km^{2} (485/sq mi)
- Time zone: UTC+01:00 (CET)
  - Summer (DST): UTC+02:00 (CEST)
- INSEE/Postal code: 30091 /30111
- ^{1} French Land Register data, which excludes lakes, ponds, glaciers > 1 km^{2} (0.386 sq mi or 247 acres) and river estuaries.

Congénies (French pronunciation: [kɔ̃ʒeni]; Occitan: Congènhas) is a commune in the Gard department in southern France.

It is situated between Nîmes, Montpellier, the Cévennes and the Camargue and has a strong Quaker history. Congénies possesses the only and oldest purpose-built Quaker Meeting House in France.

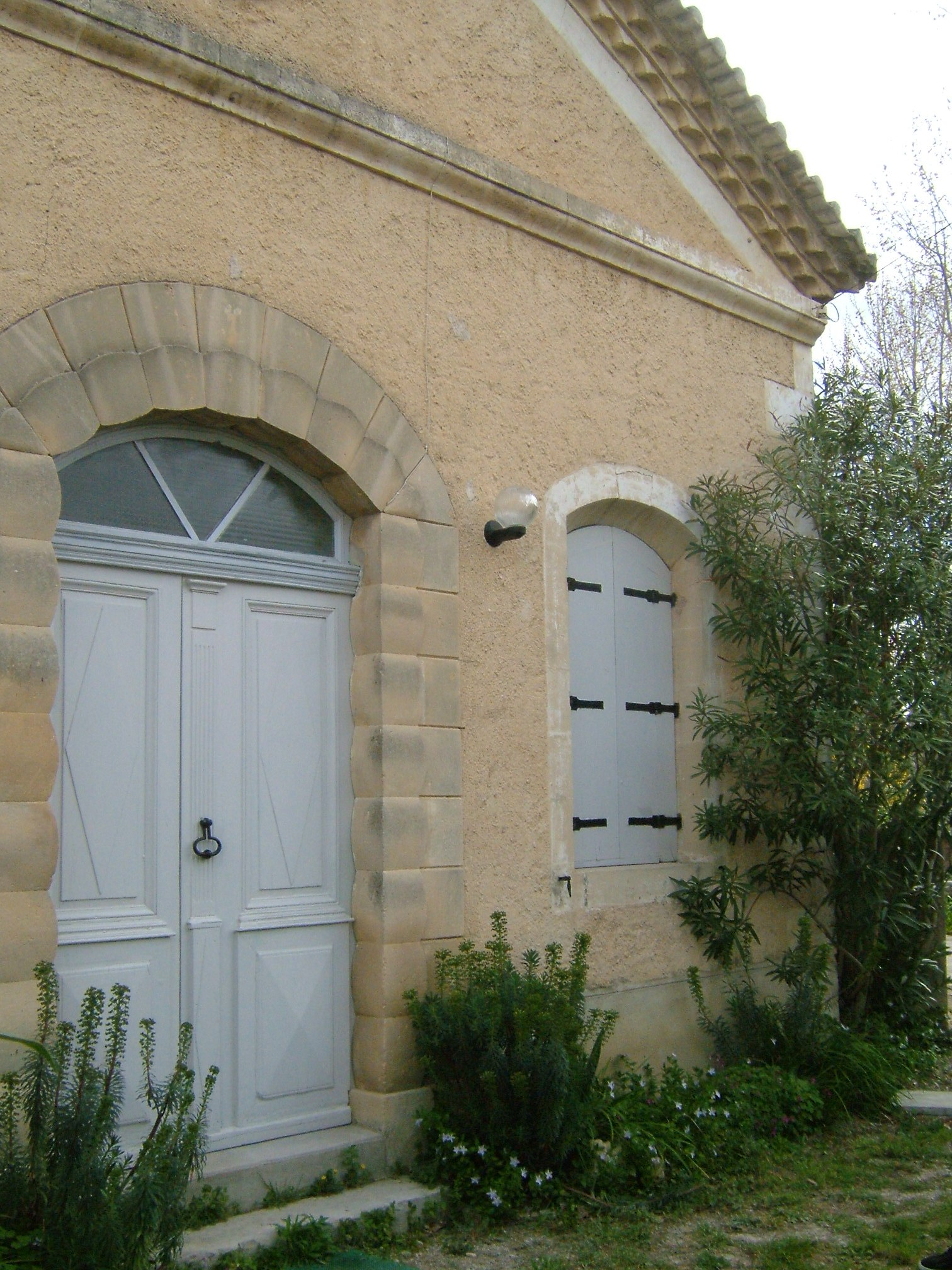
The Quaker Meeting House in Congénies

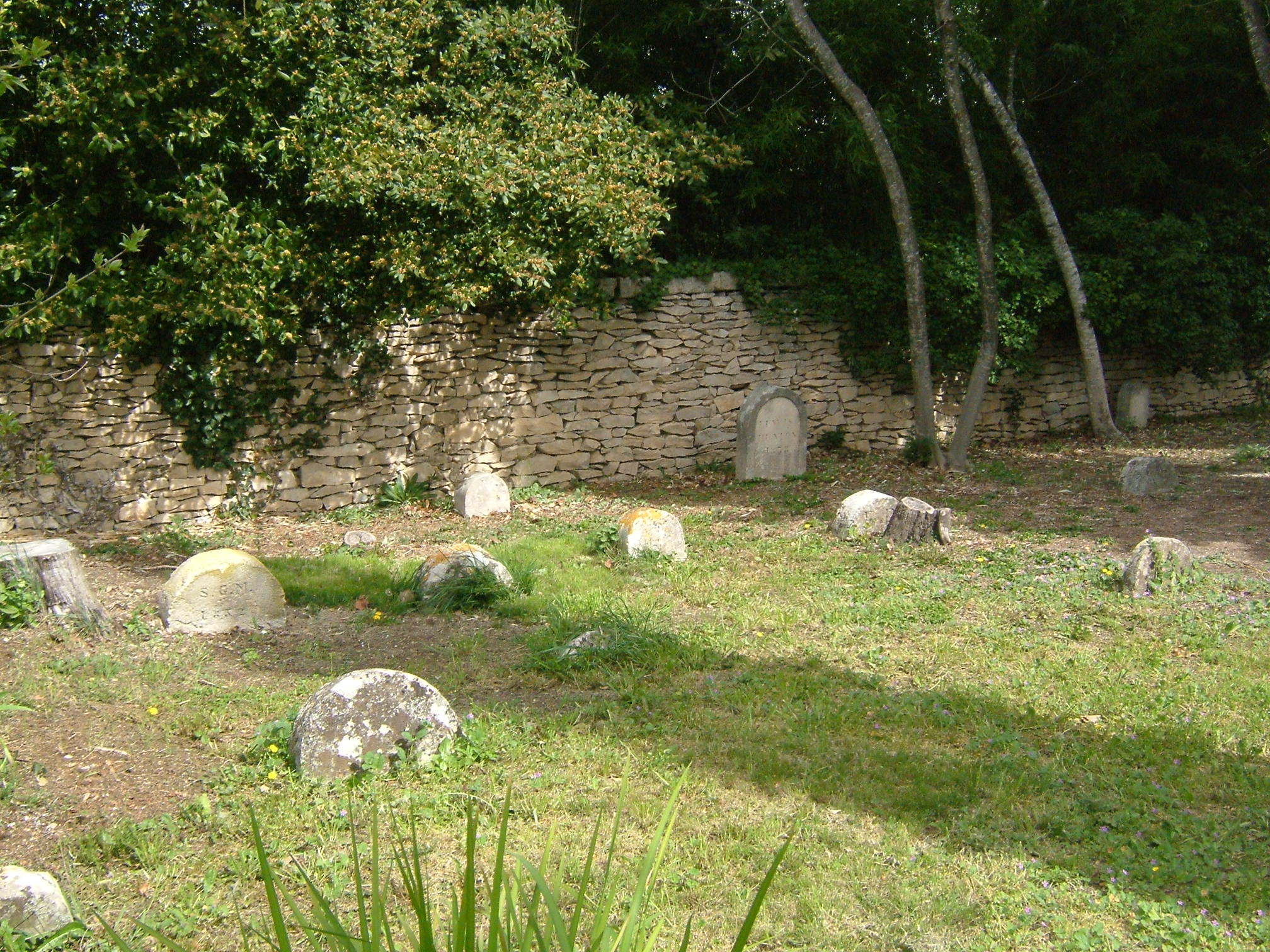
The Quaker Cemetery in Congénies

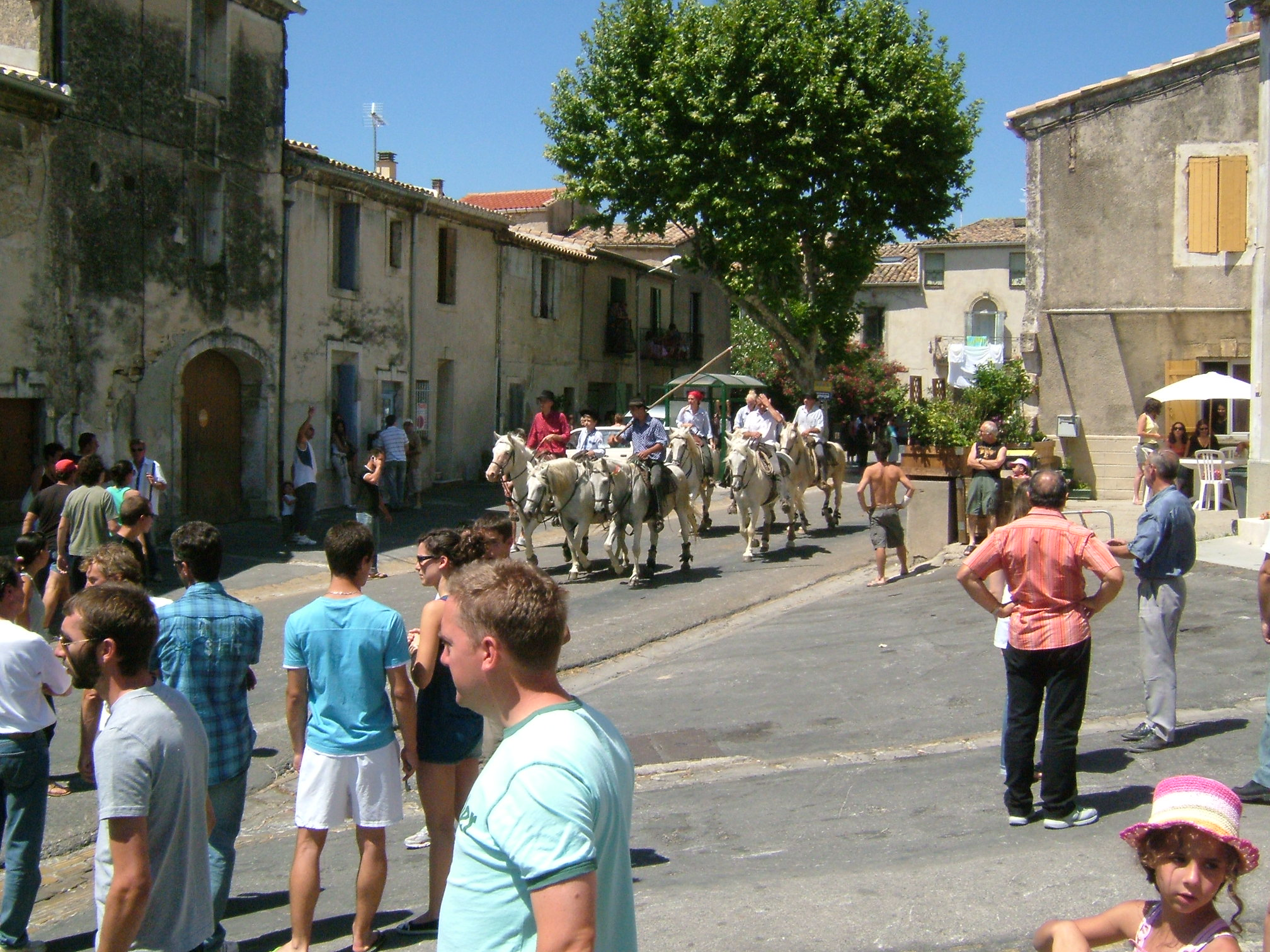
A quiet moment before or after the bull running

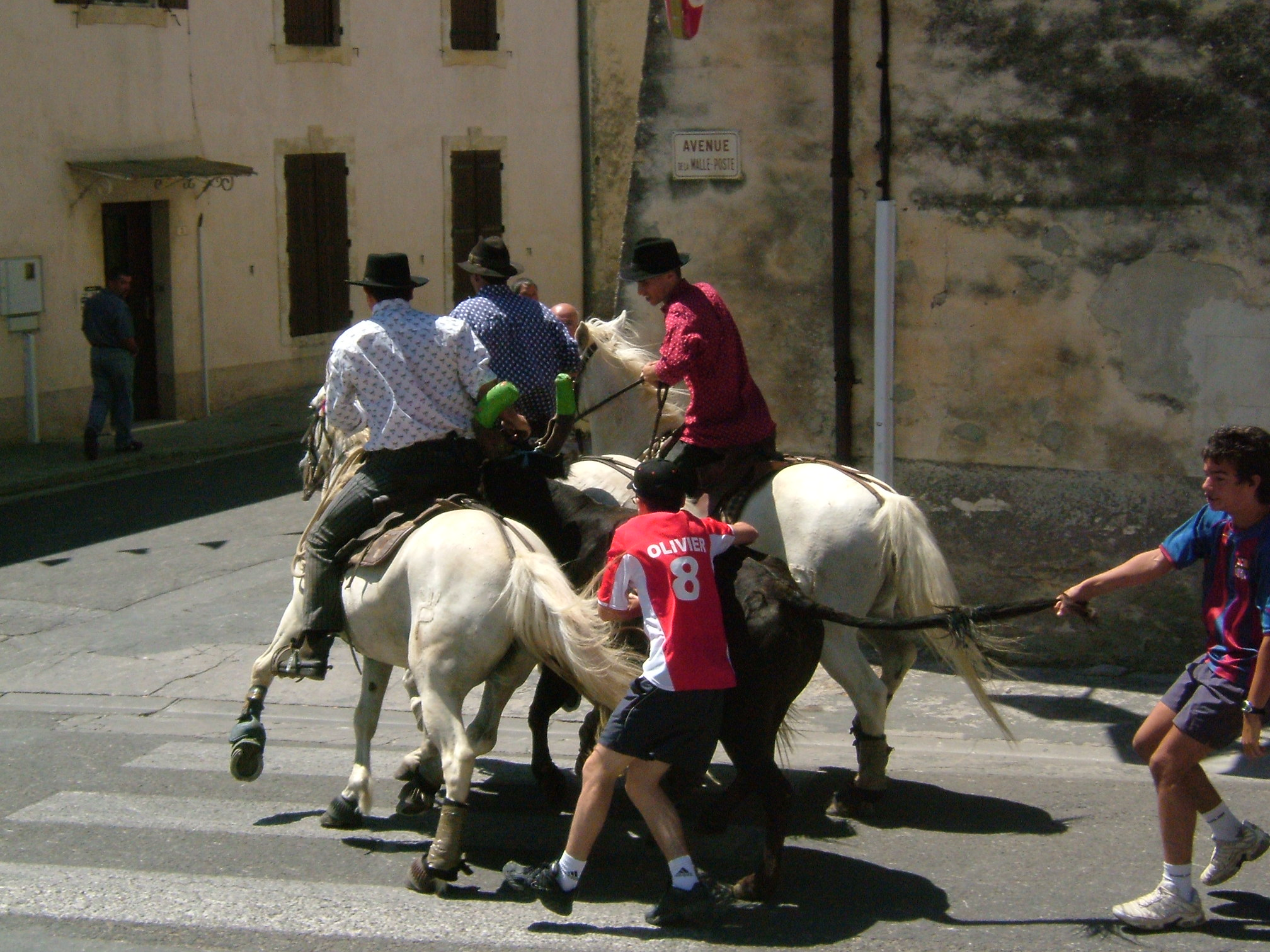
Bull running, a bandido in July 2007

== History ==
=== Wars of Religion ===
Le Desert. From 1661 onwards, the Catholic King Louis XIV used various incitations to re-convert French Protestants to Catholicism. In 1681 he started using troops to force these conversions. In 1685, the Edict of Fontainebleau outlawed Protestantism everywhere in the Kingdom of France. A lot of pastors had already either converted or emigrated and the king was under the false impression that there remained almost no Protestants in France. In fact among the plain people, chiefly farmers, farm workers and small crafters, a lot had stayed in France, complying in a minimal way with the king's demands. In 1685, the religion moved completely underground and visits by clandestine pastors became the only and very rare way to relate to the Reformed faith. In times of exasperation due to the intensity of repression, "inspired" lay prophets, claiming they took their instructions directly from God, stood up and took the lead of the "small (protestant) flock".

La Guerre des Camisards (1702–1711)

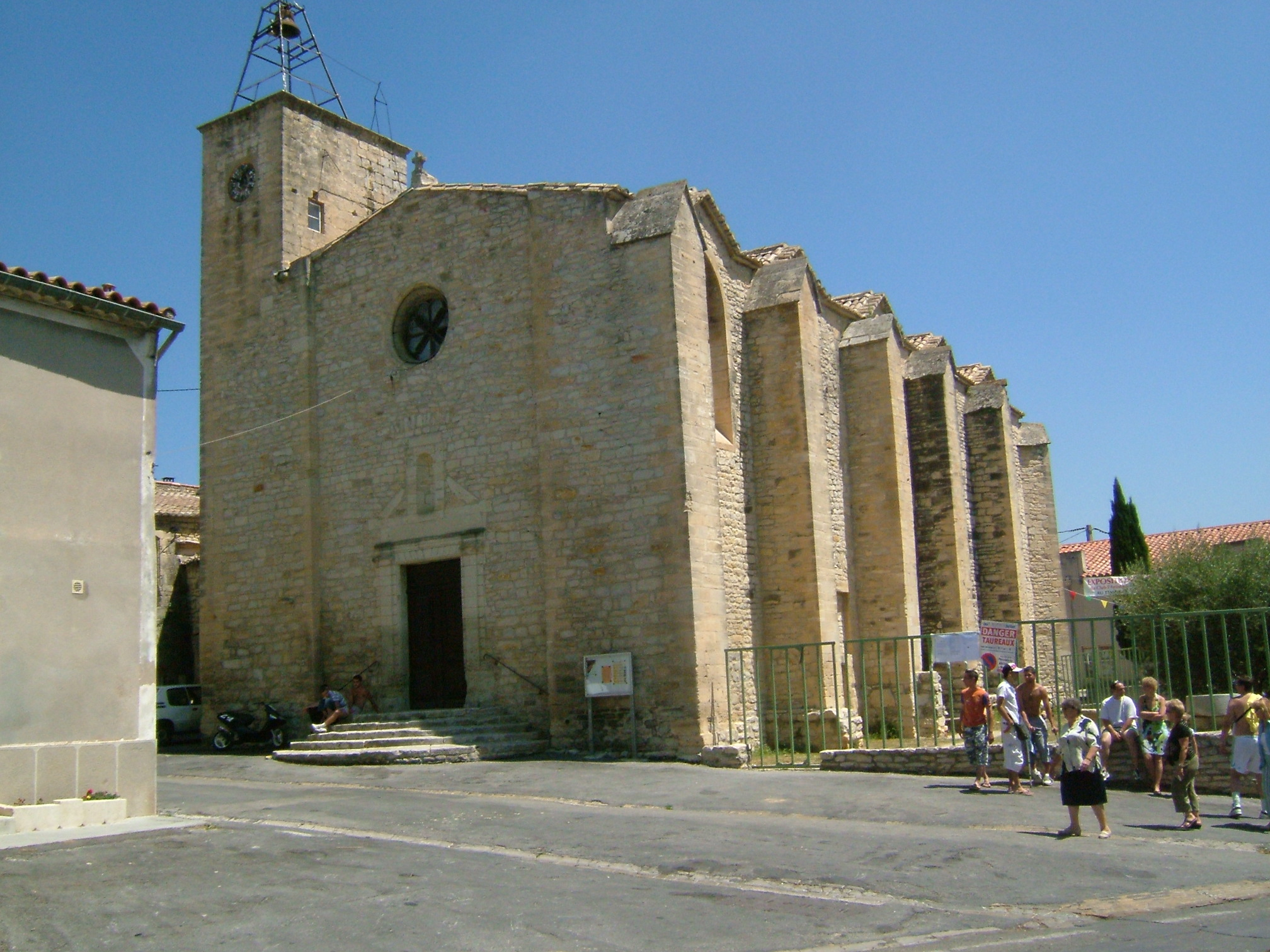
The Catholic Church today.To the right are temporary bull gates.

From July 1702, some of the prophets led peasants into an armed revolt which spread mainly in the Cévennes mountains. Le low country, where Congénies is located, was much less affected although on 17 December 1703, Jean Cavalier, a Camisard leader came down into the low country and torched the Catholic church. The people of Congénies and the surrounding region, the Vaunage, are believed to have remained faithful to the general non-violent line which prevailed in other French Protestant regions. Congénies was affected a second time between 19 and 27 May 1704 when peace negotiations were organised between the Royal troops commander Marshall de Villars and Jean Cavalier in the neighbouring village of Calvisson. During these eight days there was a general truce in which allowed the Cévennes' prophets to interact freely with the population. Numerous public Protestant worships were organised at this occasion. The local religious tradition was thus principled and relied on an inner spirit, the Inspiration. This history set the stage for the ensuing religious developments in Congénies, among which the development of a local quaker community, wholly unrelated to any other quaker group, and the blossoming of a Methodist mission under the leadership of the English pastor Charles Cook.

=== Quaker connection ===
In 1715, Jean Bénezet of Calvisson was exiled to Holland, and then to London. His son, Antoine, made it to Philadelphia. Both joined the Society of Friends.

Paul Codognan, born in Congénies, walked to London in 1768 and returned on foot to Congénies with Quaker literature. In 1785, the Inspiré made formal contact with the Society of Friends in London.

The Meeting house and cemetery was built on land purchased from Georges Majolier in 1822. It remained in the ownership of the Societes des Amis, until 1907, when the group was too small to maintain it. This was caused by young men emigrating as they could not accept military service, and the young women marrying out of the Society. The Meeting House served as a hospital in the First World War, and was owned in recent years by two English Quaker families and was sold back to the French Friends in 2003. The building has been gutted and is being rebuilt with the interior in the modern style. The exterior is being maintained, and the future of the cemetery is safe.

The name Congénies appears in many Quaker biographies (e.g., that of John Yeardley,) giving evidence of frequent visits. Congénies possessed also a méthodist chapelle between 1869 and 1968.

== Population ==
Historical population
Year	Pop.	±% p.a.
1968	473	—
1975	496	+0.68%
1982	596	+2.66%
1990	903	+5.33%
1999	1,072	+1.92%
2007	1,530	+4.55%
2012	1,574	+0.57%
2017	1,668	+1.17%
2023	1,617	−0.52%
Source: INSEE

== Pronunciation and spelling ==
The name Congénies stems from the Latin Congeniæ and is spelt Coungènio in local Occitan language - knowing that the final "o" is mute in Occitan. Therefore, in spite of the ornamental final "s" which was added, the right pronunciation is "congéni" and the pronunciation with an accent on the final "e" (congéniès) is a sure marker of a non-native. Only the resemblance with names which do have a final "ès" instead of the rarer "es" (e.g. Saint-Geniès-des-Mourgues) can explain this confusion, which, strangely, became official when a ministerial decree of 12 July 1878 dealing with the construction of the train station reproduced the mistake in print. The mistake then appeared on the train station itself and on many documents, postcards, etc. since then. Only in the early 1960s was the correct spelling reestablished... which didn't prevent the "accent of division" to reappear when new road signs were put in place in 1994, nor did it prevent the inhabitants of the wider region to continue to pronounce congéniès. Alain Pierrugues et Édouard Ravon are for instance propagating this error in a recent book, adding the theory that it is a sign that original Languedoc French has been replaced by a more standardised Northern French. Local usage of the "congéni" pronunciation remained however unchanged.

== Sights ==
The gothic catholic church ( XIIème-XVIIème ) with the " Nogaret bell" The Protestant temple was built between 1817 and 1818, the menhir of Peyra Plantada ( 2500 BC ) is considerably older and there are many capitelles in the garrigues.

== Present ==
Congénies celebrates its Languedoc heritage with the traditional bull running. Over three days each year there are Abrivados and Bandidos, and bandido de nuit, this occurs over the weekend of 14 July.

== See also ==
- Communes of the Gard department
