= Saint-Côme-et-Maruéjols =

- Commune
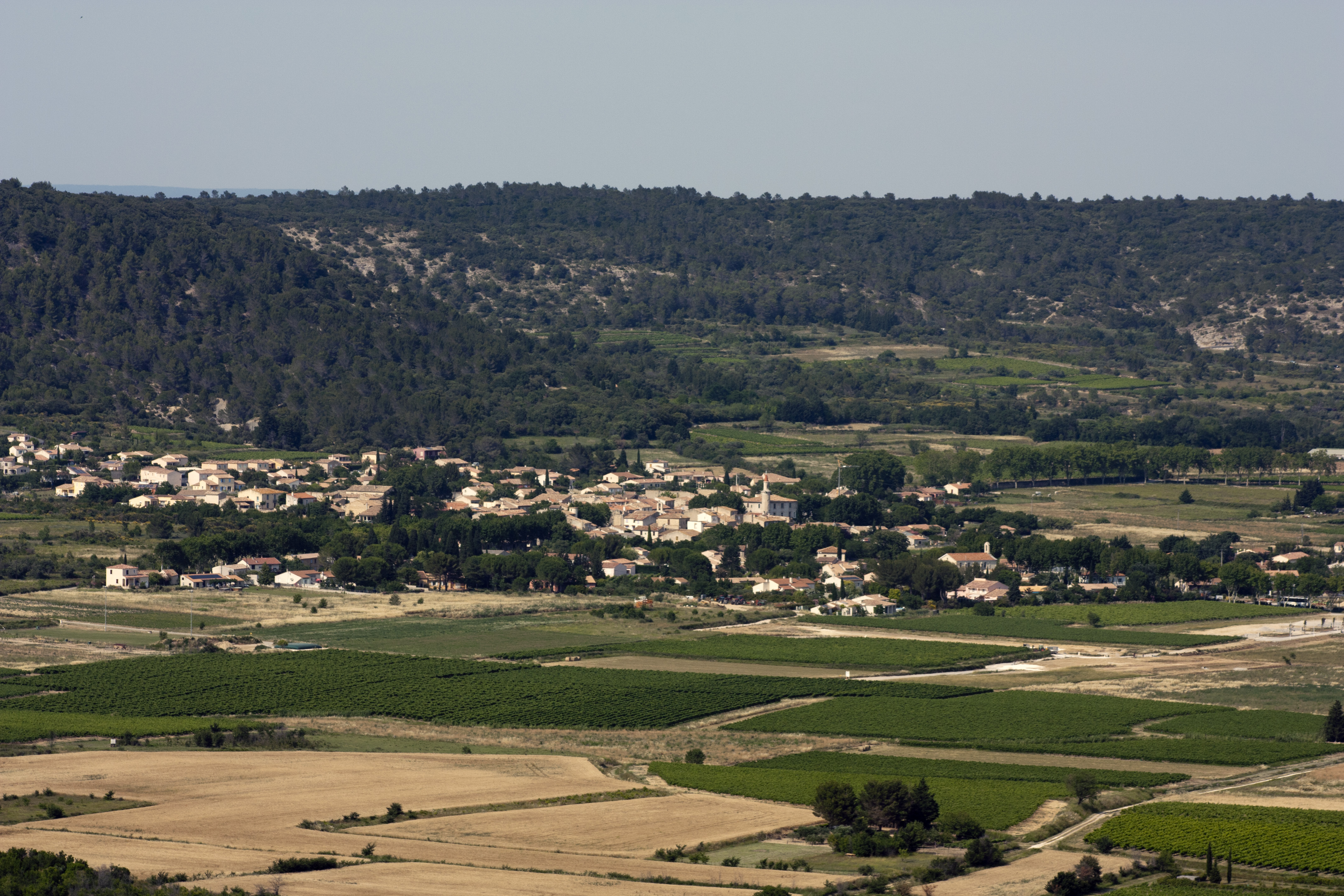
- A general view of Saint-Côme-et-Maruéjols
- Location of Saint-Côme-et-Maruéjols
- Location within France Location within Occitanie
- Coordinates: 43°49′45″N 4°12′11″E
- Country: France
- Region: Occitania
- Department: Gard
- Arrondissement: Nîmes
- Canton: Saint-Gilles
- Intercommunality: CA Nîmes Métropole

Government
  - Mayor (2020–2026): Michel Verdier
- Area^{1}: 13.01 km^{2} (5.02 sq mi)
- Elevation: 52 m (171 ft)
- Highest elevation: 206 m (676 ft)
- Lowest elevation: 42 m (138 ft)
- Population (2023): 798
  - Density: 61.3/km^{2} (159/sq mi)
- Time zone: UTC+01:00 (CET)
  - Summer (DST): UTC+02:00 (CEST)
- INSEE/Postal code: 30245 /30870
- ^{1} French Land Register data, which excludes lakes, ponds, glaciers > 1 km^{2} (0.386 sq mi or 247 acres) and river estuaries.

Saint-Côme-et-Maruéjols (French pronunciation: [sɛ̃ kom e maʁɥeʒɔl]; Occitan: Sent Còsme e Maruèjols) is a commune in the Gard department in southern France.

== Population ==
Historical population
Year	Pop.	±% p.a.
1968	294	—
1975	290	−0.20%
1982	351	+2.76%
1990	410	+1.96%
1999	570	+3.73%
2007	733	+3.19%
2012	781	+1.28%
2017	790	+0.23%
2023	798	+0.17%
Source: INSEE

== See also ==
- Communes of the Gard department
