= Nages-et-Solorgues =

- Commune
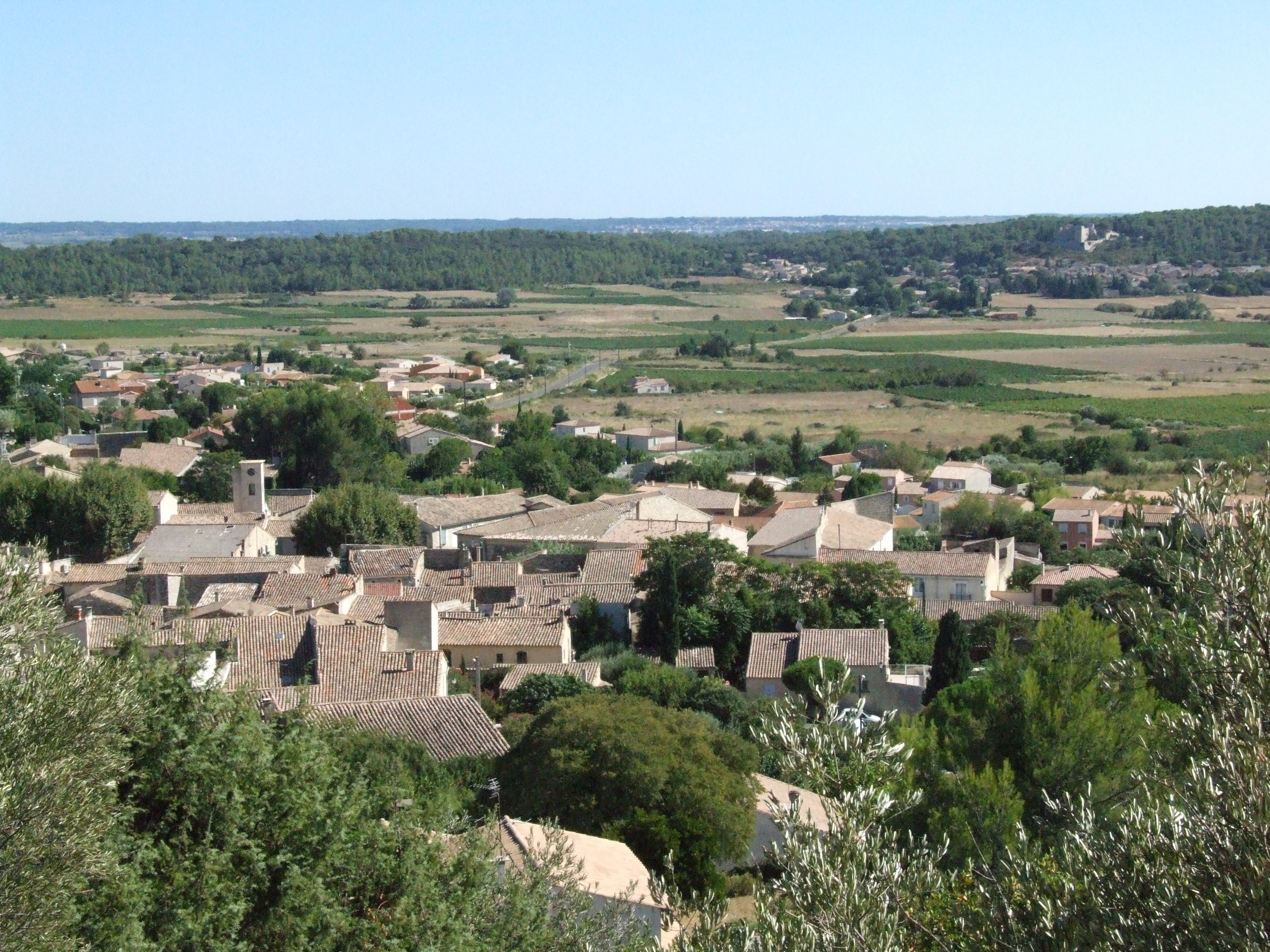
- A general view of Nages

- Coat of arms
- Location of Nages-et-Solorgues
- Location within France Location within Occitanie
- Coordinates: 43°47′30″N 4°13′51″E
- Country: France
- Region: Occitania
- Department: Gard
- Arrondissement: Nîmes
- Canton: Calvisson
- Intercommunality: Rhôny Vistre Vidourle

Government
  - Mayor (2020–2026): Michel Chambelland
- Area^{1}: 6.18 km^{2} (2.39 sq mi)
- Elevation: 42 m (138 ft)
- Highest elevation: 174 m (571 ft)
- Lowest elevation: 31 m (102 ft)
- Population (2023): 2,212
  - Density: 358/km^{2} (927/sq mi)
- Time zone: UTC+01:00 (CET)
  - Summer (DST): UTC+02:00 (CEST)
- INSEE/Postal code: 30186 /30114
- ^{1} French Land Register data, which excludes lakes, ponds, glaciers > 1 km^{2} (0.386 sq mi or 247 acres) and river estuaries.

Nages-et-Solorgues (French pronunciation: [naʒ e sɔlɔʁɡ]; Occitan: Najas e Solòrgues) is a commune in the Gard department in southern France.

== Population ==
Historical population
Year	Pop.	±% p.a.
1968	327	—
1975	451	+4.70%
1982	715	+6.80%
1990	1,088	+5.39%
1999	1,295	+1.95%
2007	1,486	+1.73%
2012	1,555	+0.91%
2017	1,736	+2.23%
2023	2,212	+4.12%
Source: INSEE

== Notable person ==
Mathieu Moulinas, convicted murderer and sex offender

== See also ==
- Communes of the Gard department
- Vaunage
