= Sommières =

- Commune
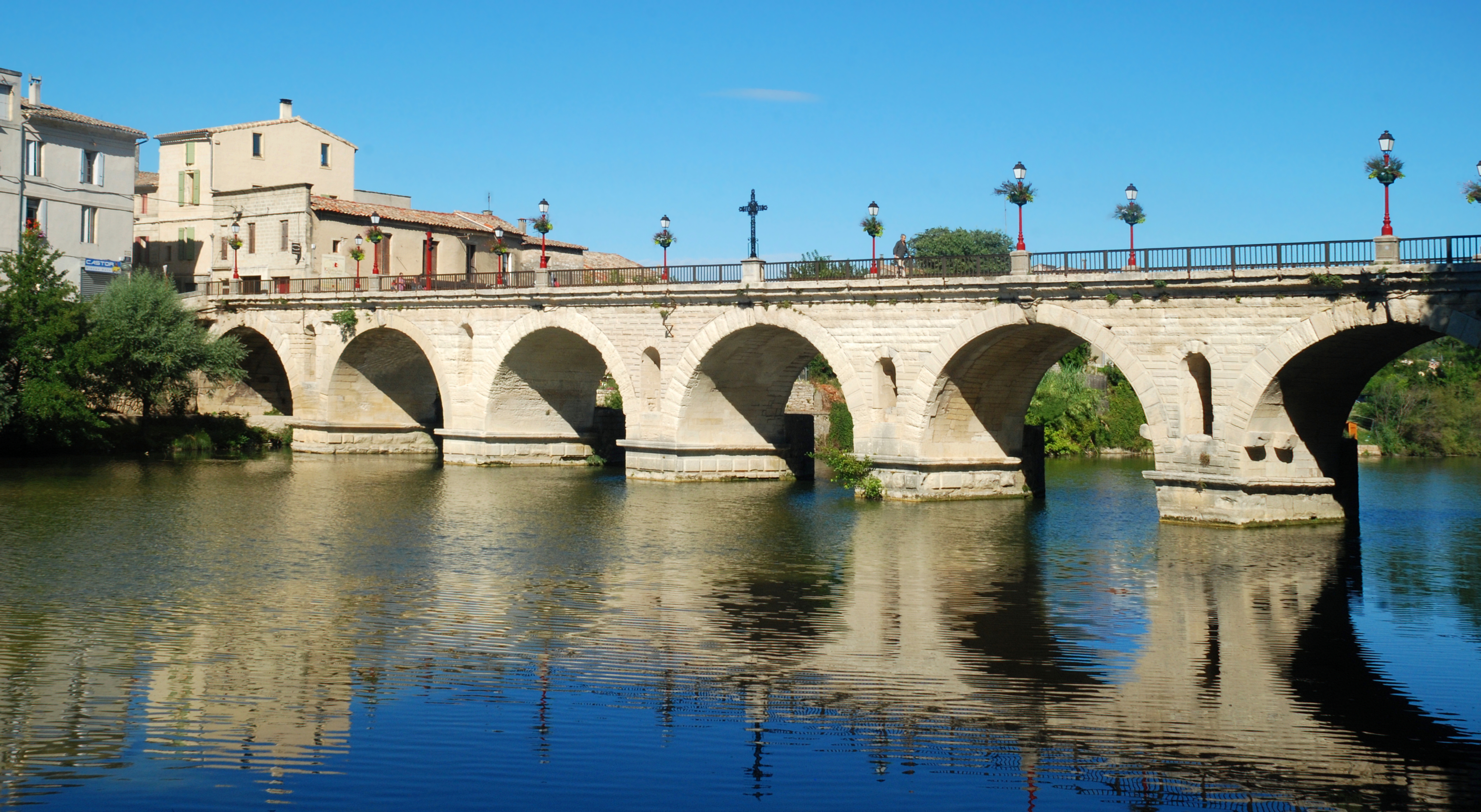
- Vidourle and the Roman Bridge

- Coat of arms
- Location of Sommières
- Location within France Location within Occitanie
- Coordinates: 43°47′07″N 4°05′27″E
- Country: France
- Region: Occitania
- Department: Gard
- Arrondissement: Nîmes
- Canton: Calvisson
- Intercommunality: Pays de Sommières

Government
  - Mayor (2020–2026): Pierre Martinez
- Area^{1}: 10.36 km^{2} (4.00 sq mi)
- Elevation: 34 m (112 ft)
- Highest elevation: 106 m (348 ft)
- Lowest elevation: 19 m (62 ft)
- Population (2023): 5,073
  - Density: 489.7/km^{2} (1,268/sq mi)
- Time zone: UTC+01:00 (CET)
  - Summer (DST): UTC+02:00 (CEST)
- INSEE/Postal code: 30321 /30250
- ^{1} French Land Register data, which excludes lakes, ponds, glaciers > 1 km^{2} (0.386 sq mi or 247 acres) and river estuaries.

Sommières (French pronunciation: [sɔmjɛʁ]; Occitan: Someire) is a commune in the Gard department in southern France, located at the border with the Hérault department.

It lies 22 km (14 mi) from Nîmes, 28 km (17 mi) from Montpellier.

== Geography ==
Sommières is to the south of the garrigues (scrubland) and on the edge of the Vaunage, a wine-growing region. It straddles the River Vidourle.

== History ==
The village first settled on the arcades of the Roman bridge on the Vidourle river, built by Roman Emperor Tiberius during the first century.

The village grew in the protection of the castle. It was annexed into the French kingdom by King Louis IX in 1248, following the crusade against the Albigensiens. It became a Protestant stronghold, and it was besieged by the Catholics in 1573 and again by Louis XIII in 1622.

=== Siege of Sommières 1573 ===
The Fourth War of Religion (1562–1598) started with the St Bartholomew's Day massacre and finished with the Edict of Nantes. The Catholic forces were trying to suppress the Huguenots in one of their strongholds. Marshall Damville laid siege to Sommières for the second time on 11 February 1573, and the garrison held out until 9 April, resisting the attackers with red hot iron and boiling oil. Though nominally a royal victory, the defenders were offered generous terms, including the right for the garrison to march out with full honours of war. The Siege of Sommières delayed the advance of the royal army by two months and is calculated to have cost them 2500 lives. Only 38 houses remained standing

=== Siege of Sommières 1622 ===
This time the Catholic king himself led the army. The siege was short. The town was back in Protestant hands in 1625 when the Protestant Duke of Rohan entered the city. He was to leave in haste and the Catholics were back. In 1703, Jean Cavalier the leader of the Camisards with a force of 800 men unsuccessfully attempted to take the city. The Revocation of the Edict of Nantes left the Protestants in a dangerous situation - and the Château at Sommières was used to incarcerate them - along with English and Dutch sailors and women accused of prostitution.

=== Recent history ===
The town has always been prone to flooding, and as recently as 2002 the River Vidourle flooded, causing major damage to the town and properties along the bank. This time it washed out the Champion supermarket, which reopened at Villevieille in July 2008. In October 2008 this supermarket was rebranded Carrefour. The floods are called 'vidourlades'.

== Population ==
Historical population

Year	Pop.	±% p.a.
1793	3,437	—
1800	3,299	−0.58%
1806	3,449	+0.74%
1821	3,684	+0.44%
1831	3,632	−0.14%
1836	3,733	+0.55%
1841	3,697	−0.19%
1846	3,799	+0.55%
1851	3,923	+0.64%
1856	4,040	+0.59%
1861	4,010	−0.15%
1866	3,875	−0.68%
1872	4,000	+0.53%
1876	3,734	−1.71%
1881	3,771	+0.20%
1886	3,838	+0.35%
1891	3,821	−0.09%
1896	3,740	−0.43%
1901	3,780	+0.21%

Year	Pop.	±% p.a.
1906	3,796	+0.08%
1911	3,173	−3.52%
1921	3,128	−0.14%
1926	3,130	+0.01%
1931	3,307	+1.11%
1936	3,074	−1.45%
1946	2,817	−0.87%
1954	2,935	+0.51%
1962	3,145	+0.87%
1968	3,311	+0.86%
1975	3,070	−1.07%
1982	2,934	−0.65%
1990	3,250	+1.29%
1999	3,677	+1.38%
2007	4,484	+2.51%
2012	4,529	+0.20%
2017	4,917	+1.66%
2023	5,073	+0.52%

Source: EHESS and INSEE (1968-2023)

== Sights ==
The village has a Roman bridge, a medieval centre, a fortified gate and the ruins of a castle.

The Roman bridge is 190m long, it was built on the instructions of Emperor Tiberius at the start of the 1st century. It was restored in the 18th century. At the town end of the bridge is the gothic town gate known as the 'Tour de l'Horloge'. Only 7 of the 19 arches can be seen, the others lie beneath the town where they act as cellars.

The ancient Roman road (Via Luteva) leads from the gate, along the Grande Rue to the 'Marché-Haut' or Place Jean Jaurès, the old wheat market. Here it turns left and leaves the town heading to Alès, and Nîmes.

== Economy ==
Sommières used to be a centre for leather and linen.

== Personalities ==
The writer Lawrence Durrell lived in Sommières from 1966 to 1990, and is buried in the churchyard of the Chapelle St-Julien de Montredon.

The writer Alan Furst lived in Sommières in 1969 while teaching at the University of Montpellier on a Fulbright Fellowship.

== Radio Sommières 102.9 FM ==
Radio Sommières 102.9 FM (also called Radio-S) is one of the biggest non commercial radio exclusively made by youngsters from 9 to 18 years. It is possible to listen to Radio-S in Sommières on 102.9 MHz. But the sending power is limited to 10 W PAR, so it is almost impossible to listen to it outside Sommières. It is possible to listen Radio-S over all the world via the radio's internet site.

The participants are free to create their own programmes and broadcast them.

== Gallery ==
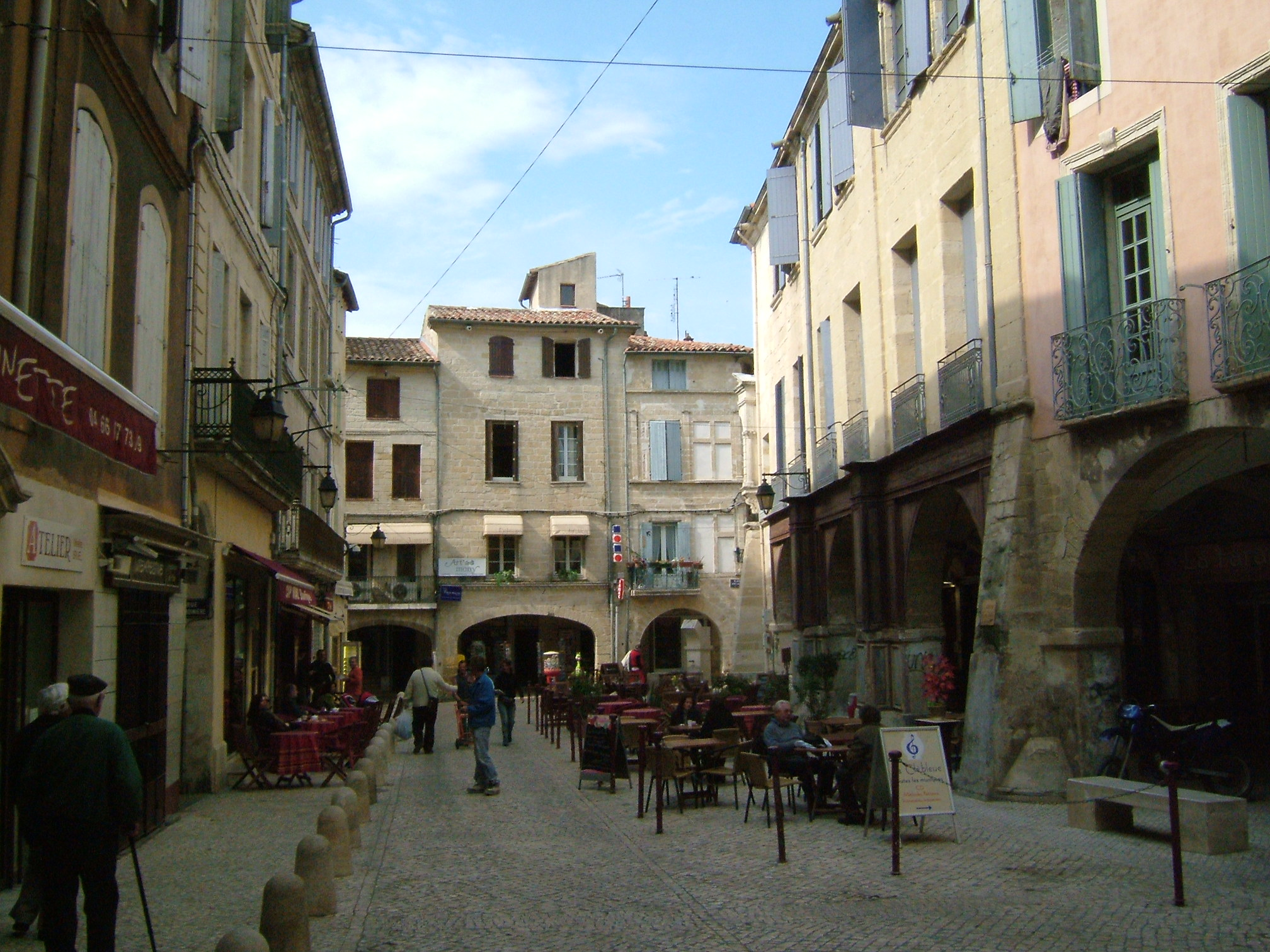
The medieval centre of Sommières

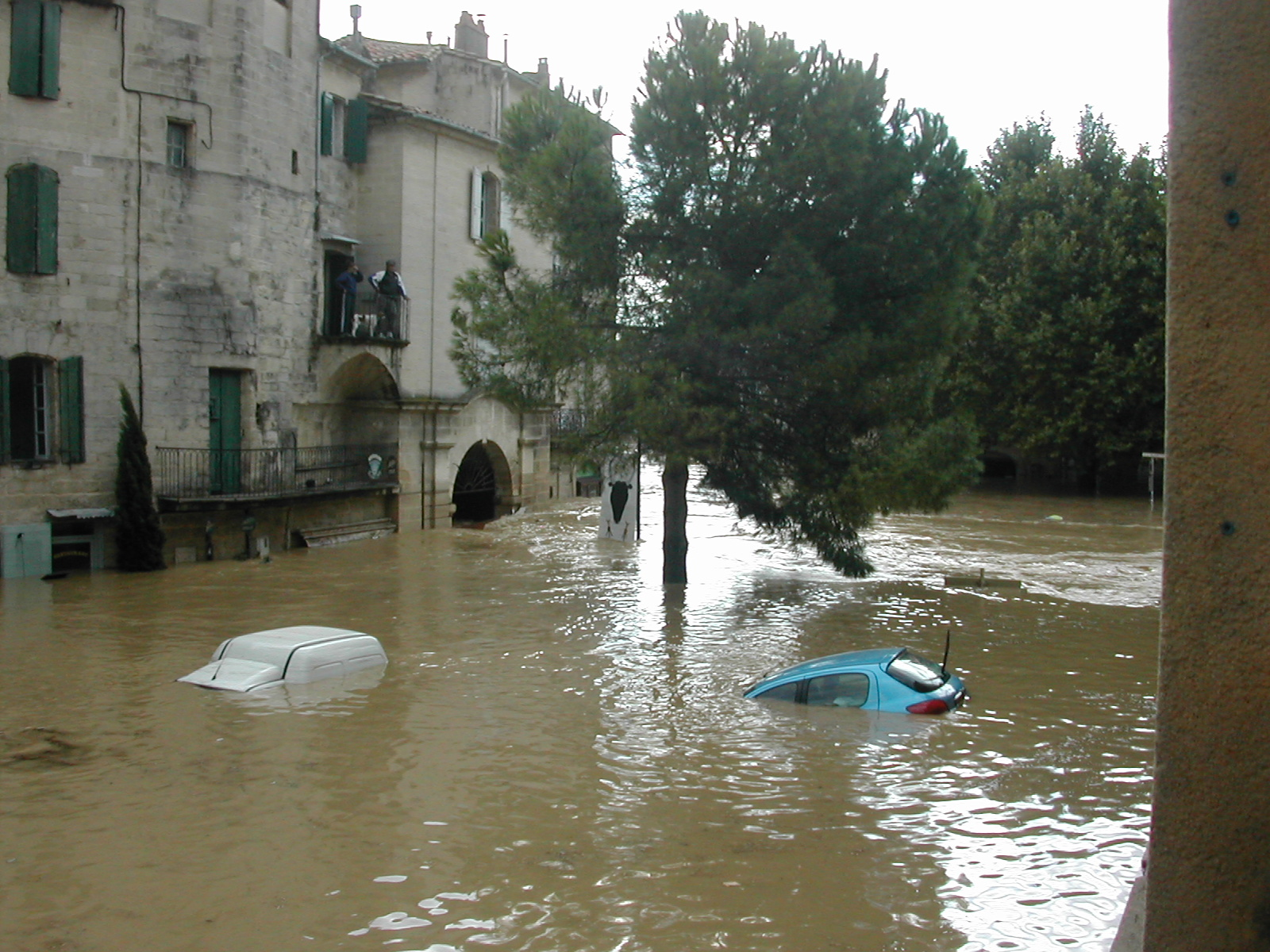
The 2002 floods at Sommières

== See also ==
- Communes of the Gard department
