= List of minor planets: 819001–820000 =

The following is a partial list of minor planets, running from minor-planet number 819001 through 820000, inclusive. The primary data for this and other partial lists is based on JPL's "Small-Body Orbital Elements" and data available from the Minor Planet Center. Critical list information is also provided by the MPC, unless otherwise specified from Lowell Observatory. A detailed description of the table's columns and additional sources are given on the main page including a complete list of every page in this series, and a statistical break-up on the dynamical classification of minor planets.

Also see the summary list of all named bodies in numerical and alphabetical order, and the corresponding naming citations for the number range of this particular list. New namings may only be added to this list after official publication, as the preannouncement of names is condemned by the Working Group for Small Bodies Nomenclature of the International Astronomical Union.

Near-Earth obj.	MBA (inner)	MBA (outer)	Centaur
Mars-crosser	MBA (middle)	Jupiter trojan	Trans-Neptunian obj.
Unclassified

== 819001–819100 ==
Designation			Discovery			Properties		Ref
Permanent	Provisional	Named after	Date	Site	Discoverer(s)	Category	Diam.	Ref
819001	2014 DO_{86}	—	January 15, 2010	Catalina	CSS	MAS	610 m	MPC · JPL
819002	2014 DR_{89}	—	February 26, 2014	Mount Lemmon	Mount Lemmon Survey	EUN	910 m	MPC · JPL
819003	2014 DL_{97}	—	December 10, 2009	Mount Lemmon	Mount Lemmon Survey	·	720 m	MPC · JPL
819004	2014 DX_{97}	—	February 27, 2014	Kitt Peak	Spacewatch	V	470 m	MPC · JPL
819005	2014 DS_{98}	—	February 27, 2014	Mount Lemmon	Mount Lemmon Survey	·	820 m	MPC · JPL
819006	2014 DK_{101}	—	February 15, 2010	Mount Lemmon	Mount Lemmon Survey	·	730 m	MPC · JPL
819007	2014 DN_{102}	—	April 15, 2007	Kitt Peak	Spacewatch	·	890 m	MPC · JPL
819008	2014 DF_{111}	—	February 26, 2014	Haleakala	Pan-STARRS 1	H	500 m	MPC · JPL
819009	2014 DG_{112}	—	February 28, 2014	Haleakala	Pan-STARRS 1	H	310 m	MPC · JPL
819010	2014 DS_{116}	—	February 9, 2014	Haleakala	Pan-STARRS 1	·	940 m	MPC · JPL
819011	2014 DC_{118}	—	July 26, 2011	Haleakala	Pan-STARRS 1	NYS	750 m	MPC · JPL
819012	2014 DB_{120}	—	February 26, 2014	Haleakala	Pan-STARRS 1	·	1 km	MPC · JPL
819013	2014 DT_{123}	—	February 22, 2014	Kitt Peak	Spacewatch	·	790 m	MPC · JPL
819014	2014 DD_{125}	—	February 26, 2014	Haleakala	Pan-STARRS 1	H	410 m	MPC · JPL
819015	2014 DX_{125}	—	February 9, 2014	Haleakala	Pan-STARRS 1	·	940 m	MPC · JPL
819016	2014 DL_{127}	—	February 28, 2014	Haleakala	Pan-STARRS 1	·	1.7 km	MPC · JPL
819017	2014 DA_{132}	—	February 22, 2014	Kitt Peak	Spacewatch	MAS	530 m	MPC · JPL
819018	2014 DN_{132}	—	August 26, 2012	Haleakala	Pan-STARRS 1	JUN	800 m	MPC · JPL
819019	2014 DW_{132}	—	February 28, 2014	Haleakala	Pan-STARRS 1	·	570 m	MPC · JPL
819020	2014 DJ_{134}	—	August 23, 2004	Kitt Peak	Spacewatch	·	840 m	MPC · JPL
819021	2014 DQ_{137}	—	March 13, 2007	Mount Lemmon	Mount Lemmon Survey	MAS	550 m	MPC · JPL
819022	2014 DY_{143}	—	February 26, 2014	Haleakala	Pan-STARRS 1	H	400 m	MPC · JPL
819023	2014 DZ_{144}	—	February 26, 2014	Haleakala	Pan-STARRS 1	·	1 km	MPC · JPL
819024	2014 DK_{145}	—	May 1, 2009	Kitt Peak	Spacewatch	·	1.5 km	MPC · JPL
819025	2014 DS_{145}	—	February 28, 2014	Haleakala	Pan-STARRS 1	·	2.4 km	MPC · JPL
819026	2014 DH_{147}	—	February 26, 2014	Haleakala	Pan-STARRS 1	·	740 m	MPC · JPL
819027	2014 DK_{147}	—	February 26, 2014	Haleakala	Pan-STARRS 1	·	800 m	MPC · JPL
819028	2014 DL_{147}	—	February 27, 2014	Haleakala	Pan-STARRS 1	·	1.3 km	MPC · JPL
819029	2014 DM_{149}	—	February 28, 2014	Haleakala	Pan-STARRS 1	MAS	530 m	MPC · JPL
819030	2014 DU_{149}	—	February 19, 2014	Mount Lemmon	Mount Lemmon Survey	·	1.6 km	MPC · JPL
819031	2014 DS_{152}	—	November 4, 2005	Kitt Peak	Spacewatch	MAS	550 m	MPC · JPL
819032	2014 DM_{153}	—	February 28, 2014	Haleakala	Pan-STARRS 1	V	490 m	MPC · JPL
819033	2014 DF_{154}	—	February 28, 2014	Haleakala	Pan-STARRS 1	·	2.0 km	MPC · JPL
819034	2014 DH_{157}	—	February 27, 2014	Haleakala	Pan-STARRS 1	·	720 m	MPC · JPL
819035	2014 DY_{157}	—	February 28, 2014	Haleakala	Pan-STARRS 1	EUN	960 m	MPC · JPL
819036	2014 DH_{162}	—	February 28, 2014	Haleakala	Pan-STARRS 1	MAS	470 m	MPC · JPL
819037	2014 DJ_{162}	—	February 28, 2014	Haleakala	Pan-STARRS 1	·	700 m	MPC · JPL
819038	2014 DX_{162}	—	February 24, 2014	Haleakala	Pan-STARRS 1	·	1.0 km	MPC · JPL
819039	2014 DE_{163}	—	February 26, 2014	Kitt Peak	Spacewatch	·	1.6 km	MPC · JPL
819040	2014 DR_{163}	—	February 27, 2014	Mount Lemmon	Mount Lemmon Survey	·	1.4 km	MPC · JPL
819041	2014 DQ_{164}	—	February 27, 2014	Kitt Peak	Spacewatch	·	880 m	MPC · JPL
819042	2014 DR_{164}	—	February 28, 2014	Haleakala	Pan-STARRS 1	·	1.1 km	MPC · JPL
819043	2014 DW_{166}	—	February 26, 2014	Haleakala	Pan-STARRS 1	ERI	950 m	MPC · JPL
819044	2014 DO_{169}	—	February 22, 2014	Mount Lemmon	Mount Lemmon Survey	·	900 m	MPC · JPL
819045	2014 DE_{170}	—	February 26, 2014	Haleakala	Pan-STARRS 1	·	1.8 km	MPC · JPL
819046	2014 DQ_{172}	—	February 26, 2014	Haleakala	Pan-STARRS 1	NYS	840 m	MPC · JPL
819047	2014 DP_{173}	—	February 28, 2014	Haleakala	Pan-STARRS 1	V	440 m	MPC · JPL
819048	2014 DJ_{174}	—	February 25, 2014	Haleakala	Pan-STARRS 1	·	1.9 km	MPC · JPL
819049	2014 DS_{174}	—	March 13, 2003	Kitt Peak	Spacewatch	V	450 m	MPC · JPL
819050	2014 DY_{177}	—	February 28, 2014	Haleakala	Pan-STARRS 1	·	910 m	MPC · JPL
819051	2014 DX_{178}	—	February 25, 2014	Kitt Peak	Spacewatch	·	680 m	MPC · JPL
819052	2014 DD_{179}	—	February 26, 2014	Haleakala	Pan-STARRS 1	·	920 m	MPC · JPL
819053	2014 DG_{180}	—	February 21, 2014	Haleakala	Pan-STARRS 1	·	1.1 km	MPC · JPL
819054	2014 DS_{181}	—	February 28, 2014	Haleakala	Pan-STARRS 1	·	750 m	MPC · JPL
819055	2014 DZ_{181}	—	February 28, 2014	Haleakala	Pan-STARRS 1	·	770 m	MPC · JPL
819056	2014 DG_{182}	—	February 28, 2014	Haleakala	Pan-STARRS 1	·	590 m	MPC · JPL
819057	2014 DL_{184}	—	February 26, 2014	Haleakala	Pan-STARRS 1	V	420 m	MPC · JPL
819058	2014 DY_{184}	—	February 24, 2014	Haleakala	Pan-STARRS 1	·	1.5 km	MPC · JPL
819059	2014 DZ_{184}	—	February 24, 2014	Haleakala	Pan-STARRS 1	·	1.4 km	MPC · JPL
819060	2014 DE_{185}	—	February 24, 2014	Haleakala	Pan-STARRS 1	·	1.6 km	MPC · JPL
819061	2014 DQ_{185}	—	May 17, 2009	Kitt Peak	Spacewatch	·	1.7 km	MPC · JPL
819062	2014 DS_{186}	—	February 28, 2014	Haleakala	Pan-STARRS 1	·	700 m	MPC · JPL
819063	2014 DA_{188}	—	February 26, 2014	Haleakala	Pan-STARRS 1	·	1.8 km	MPC · JPL
819064	2014 DR_{189}	—	February 26, 2014	Haleakala	Pan-STARRS 1	·	630 m	MPC · JPL
819065	2014 DS_{189}	—	February 27, 2014	Haleakala	Pan-STARRS 1	·	1.5 km	MPC · JPL
819066	2014 DG_{190}	—	February 27, 2014	Kitt Peak	Spacewatch	·	1.6 km	MPC · JPL
819067	2014 DO_{191}	—	February 20, 2014	Mount Lemmon	Mount Lemmon Survey	·	650 m	MPC · JPL
819068	2014 DW_{191}	—	February 26, 2014	Haleakala	Pan-STARRS 1	EOS	1.2 km	MPC · JPL
819069	2014 DE_{192}	—	February 28, 2014	Haleakala	Pan-STARRS 1	PHO	530 m	MPC · JPL
819070	2014 DF_{193}	—	August 20, 2004	Kitt Peak	Spacewatch	NYS	870 m	MPC · JPL
819071	2014 DL_{194}	—	February 28, 2014	Haleakala	Pan-STARRS 1	NYS	750 m	MPC · JPL
819072	2014 DG_{198}	—	February 26, 2014	Haleakala	Pan-STARRS 1	MAS	520 m	MPC · JPL
819073	2014 DB_{202}	—	February 27, 2014	Haleakala	Pan-STARRS 1	MAS	490 m	MPC · JPL
819074	2014 DE_{202}	—	February 26, 2014	Haleakala	Pan-STARRS 1	·	1.3 km	MPC · JPL
819075	2014 DN_{213}	—	February 26, 2014	Haleakala	Pan-STARRS 1	·	1.7 km	MPC · JPL
819076	2014 DS_{213}	—	February 26, 2014	Haleakala	Pan-STARRS 1	·	1.7 km	MPC · JPL
819077	2014 ER	—	February 24, 2014	Haleakala	Pan-STARRS 1	H	370 m	MPC · JPL
819078	2014 EE_{1}	—	February 22, 2014	Rehoboth	L. A. Molnar	AEO	840 m	MPC · JPL
819079	2014 EL_{5}	—	February 27, 2014	Mount Lemmon	Mount Lemmon Survey	H	370 m	MPC · JPL
819080	2014 ES_{5}	—	September 26, 2008	Kitt Peak	Spacewatch	NYS	650 m	MPC · JPL
819081	2014 EU_{5}	—	March 14, 2007	Mount Lemmon	Mount Lemmon Survey	·	670 m	MPC · JPL
819082	2014 EB_{6}	—	November 26, 2005	Mount Lemmon	Mount Lemmon Survey	MAS	570 m	MPC · JPL
819083	2014 ET_{10}	—	April 19, 2009	Kitt Peak	Spacewatch	·	1.4 km	MPC · JPL
819084	2014 ED_{15}	—	March 17, 2007	Kitt Peak	Spacewatch	·	770 m	MPC · JPL
819085	2014 EP_{18}	—	March 6, 2014	Kitt Peak	Spacewatch	·	930 m	MPC · JPL
819086	2014 EA_{19}	—	March 6, 2014	Kitt Peak	Spacewatch	·	920 m	MPC · JPL
819087	2014 EJ_{19}	—	March 6, 2014	Kitt Peak	Spacewatch	·	720 m	MPC · JPL
819088	2014 EM_{21}	—	March 8, 2014	Mount Lemmon	Mount Lemmon Survey	·	1.3 km	MPC · JPL
819089	2014 EQ_{28}	—	April 20, 2007	Kitt Peak	Spacewatch	·	820 m	MPC · JPL
819090	2014 EZ_{30}	—	March 7, 2014	Kitt Peak	Spacewatch	·	770 m	MPC · JPL
819091	2014 EZ_{32}	—	December 20, 2009	Kitt Peak	Spacewatch	·	750 m	MPC · JPL
819092	2014 ES_{33}	—	March 8, 2014	Mount Lemmon	Mount Lemmon Survey	H	410 m	MPC · JPL
819093	2014 EU_{33}	—	August 26, 2012	Haleakala	Pan-STARRS 1	H	310 m	MPC · JPL
819094	2014 EW_{33}	—	March 15, 2007	Mount Lemmon	Mount Lemmon Survey	·	780 m	MPC · JPL
819095	2014 EU_{36}	—	May 9, 2005	Kitt Peak	Spacewatch	DOR	1.8 km	MPC · JPL
819096	2014 EW_{39}	—	March 28, 2009	Kitt Peak	Spacewatch	·	1.6 km	MPC · JPL
819097	2014 EV_{43}	—	March 10, 2014	Kitt Peak	Spacewatch	NYS	1.1 km	MPC · JPL
819098	2014 ED_{47}	—	February 25, 2014	Kitt Peak	Spacewatch	·	1.0 km	MPC · JPL
819099	2014 EB_{50}	—	January 29, 2014	Kitt Peak	Spacewatch	·	1.4 km	MPC · JPL
819100	2014 EZ_{50}	—	February 21, 2014	Haleakala	Pan-STARRS 1	PHO	720 m	MPC · JPL

== 819101–819200 ==
back to top

Designation			Discovery			Properties		Ref
Permanent	Provisional	Named after	Date	Site	Discoverer(s)	Category	Diam.	Ref
819101	2014 EM_{51}	—	March 12, 2014	Mount Lemmon	Mount Lemmon Survey	·	1.0 km	MPC · JPL
819102	2014 EL_{56}	—	March 2, 2014	Cerro Tololo	High Cadence Transient Survey	·	760 m	MPC · JPL
819103	2014 EG_{62}	—	October 10, 2008	Mount Lemmon	Mount Lemmon Survey	·	900 m	MPC · JPL
819104	2014 EN_{63}	—	March 2, 2014	Cerro Tololo	High Cadence Transient Survey	·	2.1 km	MPC · JPL
819105	2014 ER_{63}	—	October 26, 2016	Kitt Peak	Spacewatch	·	900 m	MPC · JPL
819106	2014 EU_{66}	—	April 18, 2015	Cerro Tololo	DECam	L4	6.5 km	MPC · JPL
819107	2014 EC_{87}	—	October 23, 2012	Mount Lemmon	Mount Lemmon Survey	·	470 m	MPC · JPL
819108	2014 EP_{90}	—	September 18, 2009	Mount Lemmon	Mount Lemmon Survey	·	400 m	MPC · JPL
819109	2014 EC_{92}	—	September 10, 2016	Mount Lemmon	Mount Lemmon Survey	MRX	710 m	MPC · JPL
819110	2014 EP_{92}	—	October 8, 2016	Haleakala	Pan-STARRS 1	·	760 m	MPC · JPL
819111	2014 EW_{128}	—	July 25, 2015	Haleakala	Pan-STARRS 1	·	650 m	MPC · JPL
819112	2014 EJ_{129}	—	September 2, 2016	Mount Lemmon	Mount Lemmon Survey	·	710 m	MPC · JPL
819113	2014 EB_{133}	—	February 28, 2014	Haleakala	Pan-STARRS 1	EOS	1.2 km	MPC · JPL
819114	2014 EP_{136}	—	February 28, 2014	Haleakala	Pan-STARRS 1	·	720 m	MPC · JPL
819115	2014 ER_{145}	—	January 28, 2014	Kitt Peak	Spacewatch	·	1.8 km	MPC · JPL
819116	2014 EM_{147}	—	July 25, 2015	Haleakala	Pan-STARRS 1	V	400 m	MPC · JPL
819117	2014 EW_{149}	—	September 27, 2016	Mount Lemmon	Mount Lemmon Survey	·	1.8 km	MPC · JPL
819118	2014 EL_{152}	—	June 29, 2015	Haleakala	Pan-STARRS 1	·	1.5 km	MPC · JPL
819119	2014 EP_{156}	—	July 25, 2015	Haleakala	Pan-STARRS 1	·	860 m	MPC · JPL
819120	2014 ES_{163}	—	March 4, 2014	Cerro Tololo	High Cadence Transient Survey	EOS	1.3 km	MPC · JPL
819121	2014 ET_{163}	—	October 21, 2016	Mount Lemmon	Mount Lemmon Survey	·	750 m	MPC · JPL
819122	2014 EV_{165}	—	September 11, 2007	Catalina	CSS	·	1.7 km	MPC · JPL
819123	2014 EK_{169}	—	February 28, 2014	Haleakala	Pan-STARRS 1	·	830 m	MPC · JPL
819124	2014 EX_{169}	—	February 28, 2014	Haleakala	Pan-STARRS 1	·	760 m	MPC · JPL
819125	2014 EH_{171}	—	April 18, 2015	Cerro Tololo	DECam	L4	4.8 km	MPC · JPL
819126	2014 EA_{177}	—	October 21, 2017	Mount Lemmon	Mount Lemmon Survey	·	2.1 km	MPC · JPL
819127	2014 EB_{179}	—	August 26, 2005	Palomar	NEAT	·	600 m	MPC · JPL
819128	2014 ER_{180}	—	September 5, 2008	Kitt Peak	Spacewatch	·	620 m	MPC · JPL
819129	2014 EW_{191}	—	September 11, 2015	Haleakala	Pan-STARRS 1	H	320 m	MPC · JPL
819130	2014 EN_{198}	—	April 6, 2014	Mount Lemmon	Mount Lemmon Survey	·	1.3 km	MPC · JPL
819131	2014 EN_{204}	—	October 30, 2009	Mount Lemmon	Mount Lemmon Survey	·	560 m	MPC · JPL
819132	2014 EE_{207}	—	September 10, 2016	Mount Lemmon	Mount Lemmon Survey	·	1.8 km	MPC · JPL
819133	2014 EN_{207}	—	September 17, 2012	Mount Lemmon	Mount Lemmon Survey	·	550 m	MPC · JPL
819134	2014 ED_{209}	—	March 5, 2014	Cerro Tololo	High Cadence Transient Survey	·	970 m	MPC · JPL
819135	2014 EX_{216}	—	June 18, 2005	Mount Lemmon	Mount Lemmon Survey	·	2.2 km	MPC · JPL
819136	2014 EK_{217}	—	April 4, 2014	Haleakala	Pan-STARRS 1	·	640 m	MPC · JPL
819137	2014 EU_{221}	—	May 3, 2016	Cerro Tololo	DECam	L4	5.9 km	MPC · JPL
819138	2014 EH_{224}	—	March 16, 2007	Kitt Peak	Spacewatch	·	770 m	MPC · JPL
819139	2014 ES_{229}	—	October 10, 2007	Mount Lemmon	Mount Lemmon Survey	·	1.3 km	MPC · JPL
819140	2014 EZ_{233}	—	August 29, 2016	Mount Lemmon	Mount Lemmon Survey	·	1.2 km	MPC · JPL
819141	2014 EZ_{240}	—	March 5, 2014	Cerro Tololo	High Cadence Transient Survey	·	550 m	MPC · JPL
819142	2014 EM_{241}	—	October 17, 2012	Mount Lemmon	Mount Lemmon Survey	·	710 m	MPC · JPL
819143	2014 ED_{242}	—	August 9, 2015	Haleakala	Pan-STARRS 1	·	520 m	MPC · JPL
819144	2014 EL_{243}	—	October 8, 2016	Mount Lemmon	Mount Lemmon Survey	·	1.5 km	MPC · JPL
819145	2014 ET_{243}	—	March 30, 2015	Haleakala	Pan-STARRS 1	·	2.2 km	MPC · JPL
819146	2014 EO_{245}	—	December 22, 2008	Mount Lemmon	Mount Lemmon Survey	·	1.5 km	MPC · JPL
819147	2014 EU_{248}	—	January 11, 2010	Kitt Peak	Spacewatch	·	790 m	MPC · JPL
819148	2014 EL_{250}	—	March 11, 2014	Mount Lemmon	Mount Lemmon Survey	·	1.0 km	MPC · JPL
819149	2014 EO_{250}	—	March 8, 2014	Mount Lemmon	Mount Lemmon Survey	·	1.1 km	MPC · JPL
819150	2014 EE_{251}	—	March 7, 2014	Mount Lemmon	Mount Lemmon Survey	PHO	720 m	MPC · JPL
819151	2014 EL_{254}	—	March 6, 2014	Kitt Peak	Spacewatch	·	1.3 km	MPC · JPL
819152	2014 EN_{254}	—	March 8, 2014	Mount Lemmon	Mount Lemmon Survey	V	450 m	MPC · JPL
819153	2014 EG_{255}	—	March 8, 2014	Mount Lemmon	Mount Lemmon Survey	·	810 m	MPC · JPL
819154	2014 EA_{256}	—	March 8, 2014	Mount Lemmon	Mount Lemmon Survey	·	2.0 km	MPC · JPL
819155	2014 EZ_{256}	—	March 7, 2014	Mount Lemmon	Mount Lemmon Survey	·	1.6 km	MPC · JPL
819156	2014 EK_{258}	—	March 7, 2014	Mount Lemmon	Mount Lemmon Survey	NYS	740 m	MPC · JPL
819157	2014 EW_{258}	—	March 11, 2014	Mount Lemmon	Mount Lemmon Survey	·	930 m	MPC · JPL
819158	2014 FN	—	March 20, 2014	Haleakala	Pan-STARRS 1	H	450 m	MPC · JPL
819159	2014 FK_{1}	—	February 26, 2014	Haleakala	Pan-STARRS 1	·	780 m	MPC · JPL
819160	2014 FE_{7}	—	July 30, 2012	Haleakala	Pan-STARRS 1	H	360 m	MPC · JPL
819161	2014 FK_{10}	—	April 18, 2007	Kitt Peak	Spacewatch	NYS	630 m	MPC · JPL
819162	2014 FQ_{16}	—	October 8, 2008	Mount Lemmon	Mount Lemmon Survey	BRG	1.2 km	MPC · JPL
819163	2014 FQ_{17}	—	February 26, 2014	Haleakala	Pan-STARRS 1	·	930 m	MPC · JPL
819164	2014 FZ_{18}	—	February 19, 2014	Mount Lemmon	Mount Lemmon Survey	·	1.8 km	MPC · JPL
819165	2014 FG_{22}	—	February 22, 2007	Kitt Peak	Spacewatch	·	590 m	MPC · JPL
819166	2014 FA_{26}	—	February 28, 2014	Haleakala	Pan-STARRS 1	URS	2.2 km	MPC · JPL
819167	2014 FV_{26}	—	September 25, 2012	Mount Lemmon	Mount Lemmon Survey	V	450 m	MPC · JPL
819168	2014 FR_{27}	—	February 28, 2014	Haleakala	Pan-STARRS 1	·	620 m	MPC · JPL
819169	2014 FS_{30}	—	February 26, 2014	Haleakala	Pan-STARRS 1	PHO	590 m	MPC · JPL
819170	2014 FV_{34}	—	February 26, 2014	Mount Lemmon	Mount Lemmon Survey	·	1.2 km	MPC · JPL
819171	2014 FZ_{36}	—	February 22, 2014	Kitt Peak	Spacewatch	·	1.3 km	MPC · JPL
819172	2014 FS_{38}	—	November 21, 2008	Kitt Peak	Spacewatch	·	400 m	MPC · JPL
819173	2014 FJ_{40}	—	April 15, 2007	Kitt Peak	Spacewatch	·	870 m	MPC · JPL
819174	2014 FB_{42}	—	March 25, 2014	Kitt Peak	Spacewatch	NYS	720 m	MPC · JPL
819175	2014 FK_{44}	—	February 20, 2006	Kitt Peak	Spacewatch	H	360 m	MPC · JPL
819176	2014 FU_{46}	—	February 28, 2014	Haleakala	Pan-STARRS 1	·	2.6 km	MPC · JPL
819177	2014 FL_{48}	—	February 26, 2014	Haleakala	Pan-STARRS 1	·	790 m	MPC · JPL
819178	2014 FF_{55}	—	February 26, 2014	Haleakala	Pan-STARRS 1	·	600 m	MPC · JPL
819179	2014 FV_{55}	—	April 20, 2007	Kitt Peak	Spacewatch	·	780 m	MPC · JPL
819180	2014 FX_{55}	—	March 4, 2014	Oukaïmeden	M. Ory	·	1.1 km	MPC · JPL
819181	2014 FZ_{60}	—	April 1, 2014	Mount Lemmon	Mount Lemmon Survey	L4	5.9 km	MPC · JPL
819182	2014 FE_{66}	—	April 4, 2014	Haleakala	Pan-STARRS 1	·	2.0 km	MPC · JPL
819183	2014 FL_{67}	—	April 1, 2014	Mount Lemmon	Mount Lemmon Survey	·	740 m	MPC · JPL
819184	2014 FB_{73}	—	March 24, 2014	Haleakala	Pan-STARRS 1	·	2.4 km	MPC · JPL
819185	2014 FG_{73}	—	March 27, 2014	Haleakala	Pan-STARRS 1	·	2.2 km	MPC · JPL
819186	2014 FK_{77}	—	March 24, 2014	Haleakala	Pan-STARRS 1	·	1.4 km	MPC · JPL
819187	2014 FW_{78}	—	March 22, 2014	Mount Lemmon	Mount Lemmon Survey	H	380 m	MPC · JPL
819188	2014 FA_{79}	—	March 28, 2014	Mount Lemmon	Mount Lemmon Survey	·	2.2 km	MPC · JPL
819189	2014 FB_{79}	—	February 19, 2010	Kitt Peak	Spacewatch	·	990 m	MPC · JPL
819190	2014 FC_{79}	—	March 28, 2014	Mount Lemmon	Mount Lemmon Survey	ERI	1.2 km	MPC · JPL
819191	2014 FV_{80}	—	March 23, 2014	Kitt Peak	Spacewatch	·	730 m	MPC · JPL
819192	2014 FK_{81}	—	March 25, 2014	Catalina	CSS	·	2.1 km	MPC · JPL
819193	2014 FB_{82}	—	March 24, 2014	Haleakala	Pan-STARRS 1	·	790 m	MPC · JPL
819194	2014 FC_{82}	—	March 25, 2014	Mount Lemmon	Mount Lemmon Survey	·	560 m	MPC · JPL
819195	2014 FC_{84}	—	March 27, 2014	Haleakala	Pan-STARRS 1	·	1.1 km	MPC · JPL
819196	2014 FB_{85}	—	September 22, 2012	Mount Lemmon	Mount Lemmon Survey	H	370 m	MPC · JPL
819197	2014 FO_{86}	—	March 26, 2014	Mount Lemmon	Mount Lemmon Survey	·	580 m	MPC · JPL
819198	2014 FR_{86}	—	March 24, 2014	Haleakala	Pan-STARRS 1	·	730 m	MPC · JPL
819199	2014 FX_{86}	—	March 31, 2014	Mount Lemmon	Mount Lemmon Survey	·	680 m	MPC · JPL
819200	2014 FB_{87}	—	March 24, 2014	Haleakala	Pan-STARRS 1	·	2.0 km	MPC · JPL

== 819201–819300 ==
back to top

Designation			Discovery			Properties		Ref
Permanent	Provisional	Named after	Date	Site	Discoverer(s)	Category	Diam.	Ref
819201	2014 FP_{88}	—	March 24, 2014	Haleakala	Pan-STARRS 1	·	1.5 km	MPC · JPL
819202	2014 FE_{90}	—	March 25, 2014	Kitt Peak	Spacewatch	HYG	1.8 km	MPC · JPL
819203	2014 FD_{92}	—	March 25, 2014	Mount Lemmon	Mount Lemmon Survey	·	1.8 km	MPC · JPL
819204	2014 GO_{3}	—	February 26, 2014	Haleakala	Pan-STARRS 1	·	940 m	MPC · JPL
819205	2014 GX_{3}	—	February 26, 2014	Haleakala	Pan-STARRS 1	·	720 m	MPC · JPL
819206	2014 GM_{5}	—	February 26, 2014	Haleakala	Pan-STARRS 1	NYS	840 m	MPC · JPL
819207	2014 GQ_{6}	—	April 1, 2014	Mount Lemmon	Mount Lemmon Survey	H	330 m	MPC · JPL
819208	2014 GB_{7}	—	November 21, 2006	Mount Lemmon	Mount Lemmon Survey	·	1.7 km	MPC · JPL
819209	2014 GH_{7}	—	April 1, 2014	Mount Lemmon	Mount Lemmon Survey	·	870 m	MPC · JPL
819210	2014 GK_{9}	—	April 18, 2007	Mount Lemmon	Mount Lemmon Survey	·	750 m	MPC · JPL
819211	2014 GV_{11}	—	March 4, 2014	Haleakala	Pan-STARRS 1	PHO	770 m	MPC · JPL
819212	2014 GK_{18}	—	April 1, 2014	XuYi	PMO NEO Survey Program	·	1.5 km	MPC · JPL
819213	2014 GR_{19}	—	September 13, 2007	Mount Lemmon	Mount Lemmon Survey	·	1.5 km	MPC · JPL
819214	2014 GC_{21}	—	April 4, 2014	Mount Lemmon	Mount Lemmon Survey	·	1.2 km	MPC · JPL
819215	2014 GD_{26}	—	April 4, 2014	Kitt Peak	Spacewatch	NYS	830 m	MPC · JPL
819216	2014 GU_{26}	—	April 4, 2014	Kitt Peak	Spacewatch	·	770 m	MPC · JPL
819217	2014 GM_{27}	—	April 4, 2014	Mount Lemmon	Mount Lemmon Survey	·	1.8 km	MPC · JPL
819218	2014 GB_{31}	—	April 4, 2014	Haleakala	Pan-STARRS 1	H	430 m	MPC · JPL
819219	2014 GO_{32}	—	March 29, 2014	Kitt Peak	Spacewatch	·	840 m	MPC · JPL
819220	2014 GG_{33}	—	January 1, 2008	Kitt Peak	Spacewatch	·	1.5 km	MPC · JPL
819221	2014 GM_{34}	—	April 5, 2014	Haleakala	Pan-STARRS 1	H	530 m	MPC · JPL
819222	2014 GD_{36}	—	February 16, 2010	Kitt Peak	Spacewatch	NYS	820 m	MPC · JPL
819223	2014 GG_{36}	—	February 28, 2014	Haleakala	Pan-STARRS 1	·	1.1 km	MPC · JPL
819224	2014 GX_{40}	—	March 24, 2014	Haleakala	Pan-STARRS 1	·	880 m	MPC · JPL
819225	2014 GL_{41}	—	March 23, 2014	Kitt Peak	Spacewatch	·	1.2 km	MPC · JPL
819226	2014 GT_{46}	—	April 5, 2014	Haleakala	Pan-STARRS 1	·	420 m	MPC · JPL
819227	2014 GV_{46}	—	April 24, 2003	Kitt Peak	Spacewatch	NYS	710 m	MPC · JPL
819228	2014 GU_{48}	—	April 30, 2001	Kitt Peak	Spacewatch	H	370 m	MPC · JPL
819229	2014 GL_{49}	—	April 9, 2014	Haleakala	Pan-STARRS 1	APO	240 m	MPC · JPL
819230	2014 GZ_{51}	—	March 22, 2014	Mount Lemmon	Mount Lemmon Survey	JUN	790 m	MPC · JPL
819231	2014 GA_{55}	—	May 6, 2010	Mount Lemmon	Mount Lemmon Survey	·	840 m	MPC · JPL
819232	2014 GE_{55}	—	February 12, 2008	Mount Lemmon	Mount Lemmon Survey	·	1.8 km	MPC · JPL
819233	2014 GF_{55}	—	March 31, 2014	Kitt Peak	Spacewatch	·	1.4 km	MPC · JPL
819234	2014 GU_{55}	—	April 5, 2014	Haleakala	Pan-STARRS 1	THM	1.7 km	MPC · JPL
819235	2014 GL_{57}	—	April 11, 2010	Mount Lemmon	Mount Lemmon Survey	MAS	510 m	MPC · JPL
819236	2014 GR_{59}	—	April 5, 2014	Haleakala	Pan-STARRS 1	·	920 m	MPC · JPL
819237	2014 GW_{59}	—	April 1, 2014	Mount Lemmon	Mount Lemmon Survey	·	700 m	MPC · JPL
819238	2014 GO_{62}	—	April 5, 2014	Haleakala	Pan-STARRS 1	THM	1.6 km	MPC · JPL
819239	2014 GY_{63}	—	April 5, 2014	Haleakala	Pan-STARRS 1	·	1.6 km	MPC · JPL
819240	2014 GW_{65}	—	April 9, 2014	Mount Lemmon	Mount Lemmon Survey	·	1.3 km	MPC · JPL
819241	2014 GN_{66}	—	April 5, 2014	Haleakala	Pan-STARRS 1	·	800 m	MPC · JPL
819242	2014 GC_{69}	—	May 1, 2003	Kitt Peak	Spacewatch	·	790 m	MPC · JPL
819243	2014 GT_{72}	—	April 5, 2014	Haleakala	Pan-STARRS 1	·	710 m	MPC · JPL
819244	2014 GU_{72}	—	April 5, 2014	Haleakala	Pan-STARRS 1	·	1.8 km	MPC · JPL
819245	2014 GR_{73}	—	April 6, 2014	Mount Lemmon	Mount Lemmon Survey	·	1.9 km	MPC · JPL
819246	2014 GW_{73}	—	April 4, 2014	Haleakala	Pan-STARRS 1	·	1.1 km	MPC · JPL
819247	2014 GT_{74}	—	July 28, 2011	Haleakala	Pan-STARRS 1	·	790 m	MPC · JPL
819248	2014 GV_{74}	—	April 4, 2014	Kitt Peak	Spacewatch	·	930 m	MPC · JPL
819249	2014 GB_{75}	—	April 5, 2014	Haleakala	Pan-STARRS 1	·	1.8 km	MPC · JPL
819250	2014 GF_{75}	—	April 1, 2014	Catalina	CSS	H	460 m	MPC · JPL
819251	2014 GH_{76}	—	April 5, 2014	Haleakala	Pan-STARRS 1	·	2.3 km	MPC · JPL
819252	2014 GT_{76}	—	April 8, 2014	Haleakala	Pan-STARRS 1	PHO	700 m	MPC · JPL
819253	2014 GS_{77}	—	April 4, 2014	Haleakala	Pan-STARRS 1	H	450 m	MPC · JPL
819254	2014 GY_{77}	—	April 5, 2014	Haleakala	Pan-STARRS 1	·	1.2 km	MPC · JPL
819255	2014 GR_{78}	—	April 5, 2014	Haleakala	Pan-STARRS 1	V	460 m	MPC · JPL
819256	2014 GT_{78}	—	April 4, 2014	Kitt Peak	Spacewatch	NYS	890 m	MPC · JPL
819257	2014 GF_{79}	—	April 5, 2014	Haleakala	Pan-STARRS 1	EOS	1.3 km	MPC · JPL
819258	2014 GM_{79}	—	April 4, 2014	Kitt Peak	Spacewatch	·	1.1 km	MPC · JPL
819259	2014 GL_{80}	—	April 4, 2014	Kitt Peak	Spacewatch	·	1.6 km	MPC · JPL
819260	2014 GK_{81}	—	April 2, 2014	Mount Lemmon	Mount Lemmon Survey	·	1.5 km	MPC · JPL
819261	2014 GL_{81}	—	April 4, 2014	Haleakala	Pan-STARRS 1	·	840 m	MPC · JPL
819262	2014 GO_{81}	—	April 8, 2014	Haleakala	Pan-STARRS 1	H	340 m	MPC · JPL
819263	2014 GY_{81}	—	April 1, 2014	Catalina	CSS	PHO	760 m	MPC · JPL
819264	2014 GB_{82}	—	April 5, 2014	Haleakala	Pan-STARRS 1	·	1.4 km	MPC · JPL
819265	2014 GM_{83}	—	April 7, 2014	Mount Lemmon	Mount Lemmon Survey	V	470 m	MPC · JPL
819266	2014 GT_{83}	—	April 10, 2014	Haleakala	Pan-STARRS 1	·	530 m	MPC · JPL
819267	2014 GU_{83}	—	April 5, 2014	Haleakala	Pan-STARRS 1	V	440 m	MPC · JPL
819268	2014 GB_{84}	—	April 10, 2014	Haleakala	Pan-STARRS 1	·	2.0 km	MPC · JPL
819269	2014 GC_{84}	—	April 4, 2014	Kitt Peak	Spacewatch	·	2.0 km	MPC · JPL
819270	2014 GM_{85}	—	April 4, 2014	Haleakala	Pan-STARRS 1	MAS	560 m	MPC · JPL
819271	2014 GN_{85}	—	February 13, 2010	Mount Lemmon	Mount Lemmon Survey	MAS	590 m	MPC · JPL
819272	2014 GX_{85}	—	April 4, 2014	Haleakala	Pan-STARRS 1	MAS	570 m	MPC · JPL
819273	2014 GT_{86}	—	April 4, 2014	Mount Lemmon	Mount Lemmon Survey	·	800 m	MPC · JPL
819274	2014 GR_{87}	—	April 4, 2014	Kitt Peak	Spacewatch	·	1.8 km	MPC · JPL
819275	2014 GU_{87}	—	April 6, 2014	Mount Lemmon	Mount Lemmon Survey	EOS	1.4 km	MPC · JPL
819276	2014 GA_{88}	—	April 8, 2014	Mount Lemmon	Mount Lemmon Survey	EOS	1.5 km	MPC · JPL
819277	2014 GD_{88}	—	March 10, 2014	Kitt Peak	Spacewatch	(1338) (FLO)	490 m	MPC · JPL
819278	2014 GH_{88}	—	April 9, 2014	Mount Lemmon	Mount Lemmon Survey	·	1.8 km	MPC · JPL
819279	2014 GP_{89}	—	April 6, 2014	Mount Lemmon	Mount Lemmon Survey	·	800 m	MPC · JPL
819280	2014 GJ_{90}	—	April 10, 2014	Haleakala	Pan-STARRS 1	PHO	790 m	MPC · JPL
819281	2014 GQ_{90}	—	April 5, 2014	Haleakala	Pan-STARRS 1	H	410 m	MPC · JPL
819282	2014 GH_{91}	—	April 5, 2014	Haleakala	Pan-STARRS 1	·	1.8 km	MPC · JPL
819283	2014 GU_{91}	—	April 5, 2014	Haleakala	Pan-STARRS 1	EOS	1.1 km	MPC · JPL
819284	2014 GP_{95}	—	April 5, 2014	Haleakala	Pan-STARRS 1	NYS	700 m	MPC · JPL
819285	2014 GS_{98}	—	April 5, 2014	Haleakala	Pan-STARRS 1	(21885)	2.0 km	MPC · JPL
819286	2014 GE_{104}	—	April 6, 2014	Mount Lemmon	Mount Lemmon Survey	·	1.5 km	MPC · JPL
819287	2014 HR_{4}	—	April 22, 2014	Mount Lemmon	Mount Lemmon Survey	AMO	460 m	MPC · JPL
819288	2014 HB_{6}	—	April 1, 2014	Mount Lemmon	Mount Lemmon Survey	·	730 m	MPC · JPL
819289	2014 HM_{6}	—	April 20, 2014	Mount Lemmon	Mount Lemmon Survey	·	1.6 km	MPC · JPL
819290	2014 HL_{9}	—	March 27, 2014	Haleakala	Pan-STARRS 1	NYS	940 m	MPC · JPL
819291	2014 HQ_{9}	—	February 4, 2006	Kitt Peak	Spacewatch	MAS	530 m	MPC · JPL
819292	2014 HM_{12}	—	April 5, 2014	Haleakala	Pan-STARRS 1	·	760 m	MPC · JPL
819293	2014 HL_{17}	—	April 4, 2014	Kitt Peak	Spacewatch	NYS	840 m	MPC · JPL
819294	2014 HY_{17}	—	March 29, 2014	Kitt Peak	Spacewatch	·	690 m	MPC · JPL
819295	2014 HB_{18}	—	April 4, 2014	Haleakala	Pan-STARRS 1	·	750 m	MPC · JPL
819296	2014 HN_{18}	—	April 21, 2014	Mount Lemmon	Mount Lemmon Survey	MAS	550 m	MPC · JPL
819297	2014 HC_{19}	—	April 5, 2014	Haleakala	Pan-STARRS 1	·	1.5 km	MPC · JPL
819298	2014 HD_{19}	—	March 23, 2014	Kitt Peak	Spacewatch	·	960 m	MPC · JPL
819299	2014 HO_{20}	—	April 21, 2014	Mount Lemmon	Mount Lemmon Survey	·	780 m	MPC · JPL
819300	2014 HK_{21}	—	March 15, 2010	Kitt Peak	Spacewatch	·	760 m	MPC · JPL

== 819301–819400 ==
back to top

Designation			Discovery			Properties		Ref
Permanent	Provisional	Named after	Date	Site	Discoverer(s)	Category	Diam.	Ref
819301	2014 HH_{25}	—	April 5, 2014	Haleakala	Pan-STARRS 1	·	1.0 km	MPC · JPL
819302	2014 HS_{27}	—	April 5, 2014	Haleakala	Pan-STARRS 1	MAS	550 m	MPC · JPL
819303	2014 HT_{28}	—	April 24, 2014	Haleakala	Pan-STARRS 1	(5)	990 m	MPC · JPL
819304	2014 HY_{28}	—	April 24, 2014	Haleakala	Pan-STARRS 1	MAS	620 m	MPC · JPL
819305	2014 HL_{32}	—	May 2, 2003	Kitt Peak	Spacewatch	THM	1.5 km	MPC · JPL
819306	2014 HL_{34}	—	October 8, 2012	Kitt Peak	Spacewatch	H	350 m	MPC · JPL
819307	2014 HN_{34}	—	April 6, 2014	Mount Lemmon	Mount Lemmon Survey	·	890 m	MPC · JPL
819308	2014 HT_{34}	—	March 25, 2014	Kitt Peak	Spacewatch	·	710 m	MPC · JPL
819309	2014 HY_{34}	—	April 24, 2014	Mount Lemmon	Mount Lemmon Survey	HOF	1.9 km	MPC · JPL
819310	2014 HR_{35}	—	April 24, 2014	Mount Lemmon	Mount Lemmon Survey	·	1.3 km	MPC · JPL
819311	2014 HS_{36}	—	April 24, 2014	Mount Lemmon	Mount Lemmon Survey	·	800 m	MPC · JPL
819312	2014 HM_{38}	—	February 15, 2010	Kitt Peak	Spacewatch	·	880 m	MPC · JPL
819313	2014 HN_{40}	—	April 6, 2014	Kitt Peak	Spacewatch	·	1.7 km	MPC · JPL
819314	2014 HK_{44}	—	January 14, 2008	Kitt Peak	Spacewatch	·	1.6 km	MPC · JPL
819315	2014 HX_{44}	—	September 5, 2011	Bisei	BATTeRS	·	970 m	MPC · JPL
819316	2014 HA_{46}	—	April 1, 2014	Mount Lemmon	Mount Lemmon Survey	·	970 m	MPC · JPL
819317	2014 HD_{46}	—	April 24, 2014	Mount Lemmon	Mount Lemmon Survey	·	2.1 km	MPC · JPL
819318	2014 HX_{49}	—	April 4, 2014	Haleakala	Pan-STARRS 1	THM	1.6 km	MPC · JPL
819319	2014 HJ_{54}	—	May 25, 2007	Mount Lemmon	Mount Lemmon Survey	·	680 m	MPC · JPL
819320	2014 HP_{54}	—	April 23, 2014	Cerro Tololo-DECam	DECam	·	720 m	MPC · JPL
819321	2014 HA_{59}	—	October 19, 2006	Kitt Peak	Deep Ecliptic Survey	·	1.0 km	MPC · JPL
819322	2014 HB_{65}	—	October 8, 2012	Kitt Peak	Spacewatch	·	820 m	MPC · JPL
819323	2014 HU_{66}	—	June 22, 2015	Haleakala	Pan-STARRS 1	·	1.7 km	MPC · JPL
819324	2014 HG_{70}	—	April 5, 2014	Haleakala	Pan-STARRS 1	NYS	800 m	MPC · JPL
819325	2014 HS_{74}	—	October 1, 2010	Mount Lemmon	Mount Lemmon Survey	THM	1.7 km	MPC · JPL
819326	2014 HX_{74}	—	February 28, 2009	Kitt Peak	Spacewatch	·	1.3 km	MPC · JPL
819327	2014 HB_{77}	—	October 21, 2016	Mount Lemmon	Mount Lemmon Survey	·	1.9 km	MPC · JPL
819328	2014 HU_{77}	—	April 23, 2014	Cerro Tololo-DECam	DECam	·	1.8 km	MPC · JPL
819329	2014 HE_{79}	—	April 23, 2014	Cerro Tololo-DECam	DECam	·	710 m	MPC · JPL
819330	2014 HG_{79}	—	October 12, 2007	Mount Lemmon	Mount Lemmon Survey	·	1.1 km	MPC · JPL
819331	2014 HM_{81}	—	January 28, 2007	Mount Lemmon	Mount Lemmon Survey	·	510 m	MPC · JPL
819332	2014 HX_{83}	—	April 4, 2014	Haleakala	Pan-STARRS 1	·	420 m	MPC · JPL
819333	2014 HZ_{83}	—	October 9, 2015	Mount Teide	ESA OGS	·	1.2 km	MPC · JPL
819334	2014 HY_{84}	—	April 23, 2014	Cerro Tololo-DECam	DECam	·	740 m	MPC · JPL
819335	2014 HA_{88}	—	April 22, 2007	Mount Lemmon	Mount Lemmon Survey	·	610 m	MPC · JPL
819336	2014 HS_{89}	—	April 23, 2014	Cerro Tololo-DECam	DECam	·	690 m	MPC · JPL
819337	2014 HX_{90}	—	April 23, 2014	Cerro Tololo-DECam	DECam	·	800 m	MPC · JPL
819338	2014 HZ_{93}	—	September 27, 2016	Haleakala	Pan-STARRS 1	·	2.4 km	MPC · JPL
819339	2014 HS_{94}	—	April 24, 2014	Mount Lemmon	Mount Lemmon Survey	PHO	690 m	MPC · JPL
819340	2014 HD_{95}	—	October 8, 2015	Haleakala	Pan-STARRS 1	·	480 m	MPC · JPL
819341	2014 HQ_{101}	—	April 20, 2014	Mount Lemmon	Mount Lemmon Survey	·	610 m	MPC · JPL
819342	2014 HC_{103}	—	December 9, 2015	Haleakala	Pan-STARRS 1	·	450 m	MPC · JPL
819343	2014 HR_{103}	—	September 6, 2015	Paoma Mountain	PMO NEO Survey Program	·	820 m	MPC · JPL
819344	2014 HV_{103}	—	April 23, 2014	Cerro Tololo-DECam	DECam	PHO	570 m	MPC · JPL
819345	2014 HA_{105}	—	April 23, 2014	Cerro Tololo-DECam	DECam	·	900 m	MPC · JPL
819346	2014 HA_{107}	—	January 17, 2013	Haleakala	Pan-STARRS 1	·	1.5 km	MPC · JPL
819347	2014 HB_{113}	—	July 24, 2015	Haleakala	Pan-STARRS 1	·	1.7 km	MPC · JPL
819348	2014 HO_{114}	—	April 24, 2014	Mount Lemmon	Mount Lemmon Survey	·	810 m	MPC · JPL
819349	2014 HJ_{116}	—	March 3, 2009	Kitt Peak	Spacewatch	·	1.5 km	MPC · JPL
819350	2014 HD_{117}	—	October 20, 2012	Mount Lemmon	Mount Lemmon Survey	·	740 m	MPC · JPL
819351	2014 HV_{118}	—	October 26, 2011	Haleakala	Pan-STARRS 1	URS	2.3 km	MPC · JPL
819352	2014 HK_{124}	—	April 24, 2014	Mount Lemmon	Mount Lemmon Survey	H	310 m	MPC · JPL
819353	2014 HB_{125}	—	November 7, 2012	Mount Lemmon	Mount Lemmon Survey	NYS	750 m	MPC · JPL
819354	2014 HG_{130}	—	March 29, 2014	Catalina	CSS	H	350 m	MPC · JPL
819355	2014 HJ_{130}	—	April 4, 2014	Mount Lemmon	Mount Lemmon Survey	·	800 m	MPC · JPL
819356	2014 HF_{131}	—	April 23, 2014	Cerro Tololo-DECam	DECam	·	700 m	MPC · JPL
819357	2014 HG_{131}	—	April 23, 2014	Cerro Tololo-DECam	DECam	PHO	520 m	MPC · JPL
819358	2014 HU_{134}	—	April 5, 2014	Haleakala	Pan-STARRS 1	MAS	500 m	MPC · JPL
819359	2014 HM_{136}	—	May 5, 2010	Mount Lemmon	Mount Lemmon Survey	KON	1.3 km	MPC · JPL
819360	2014 HV_{136}	—	February 9, 2008	Kitt Peak	Spacewatch	critical	1.3 km	MPC · JPL
819361	2014 HY_{139}	—	April 5, 2014	Haleakala	Pan-STARRS 1	·	870 m	MPC · JPL
819362	2014 HO_{140}	—	August 25, 2011	La Sagra	OAM	·	1.0 km	MPC · JPL
819363	2014 HU_{140}	—	September 23, 2011	Haleakala	Pan-STARRS 1	·	1.0 km	MPC · JPL
819364	2014 HD_{142}	—	April 5, 2014	Haleakala	Pan-STARRS 1	·	1.6 km	MPC · JPL
819365	2014 HF_{142}	—	February 16, 2010	Kitt Peak	Spacewatch	NYS	770 m	MPC · JPL
819366	2014 HL_{142}	—	April 23, 2014	Cerro Tololo-DECam	DECam	·	1.7 km	MPC · JPL
819367	2014 HK_{146}	—	November 24, 2003	Anderson Mesa	LONEOS	JUN	840 m	MPC · JPL
819368	2014 HV_{147}	—	April 4, 2014	Mount Lemmon	Mount Lemmon Survey	·	2.0 km	MPC · JPL
819369	2014 HE_{148}	—	February 28, 2014	Haleakala	Pan-STARRS 1	MAS	590 m	MPC · JPL
819370	2014 HO_{149}	—	July 21, 2006	Mount Lemmon	Mount Lemmon Survey	·	1.6 km	MPC · JPL
819371	2014 HD_{150}	—	April 23, 2014	Cerro Tololo-DECam	DECam	·	2.1 km	MPC · JPL
819372	2014 HF_{150}	—	April 4, 2003	Kitt Peak	Spacewatch	·	820 m	MPC · JPL
819373	2014 HO_{150}	—	February 13, 2010	Mount Lemmon	Mount Lemmon Survey	·	890 m	MPC · JPL
819374	2014 HT_{151}	—	April 2, 2014	Kitt Peak	Spacewatch	·	1.0 km	MPC · JPL
819375	2014 HL_{156}	—	April 24, 2014	Cerro Tololo-DECam	DECam	EOS	1.3 km	MPC · JPL
819376	2014 HU_{159}	—	April 4, 2014	Haleakala	Pan-STARRS 1	PHO	560 m	MPC · JPL
819377	2014 HM_{169}	—	February 26, 2014	Haleakala	Pan-STARRS 1	V	510 m	MPC · JPL
819378	2014 HX_{169}	—	April 25, 2007	Kitt Peak	Spacewatch	·	770 m	MPC · JPL
819379	2014 HC_{170}	—	April 29, 2014	Haleakala	Pan-STARRS 1	·	610 m	MPC · JPL
819380	2014 HA_{171}	—	March 28, 2014	Mount Lemmon	Mount Lemmon Survey	·	730 m	MPC · JPL
819381	2014 HE_{175}	—	March 1, 2009	Kitt Peak	Spacewatch	·	1.6 km	MPC · JPL
819382	2014 HJ_{178}	—	April 30, 2014	Haleakala	Pan-STARRS 1	H	440 m	MPC · JPL
819383	2014 HQ_{179}	—	March 31, 2014	Kitt Peak	Spacewatch	MAS	530 m	MPC · JPL
819384	2014 HX_{179}	—	February 28, 2014	Haleakala	Pan-STARRS 1	·	680 m	MPC · JPL
819385	2014 HC_{180}	—	April 11, 2003	Kitt Peak	Spacewatch	·	920 m	MPC · JPL
819386	2014 HD_{181}	—	October 18, 2011	Haleakala	Pan-STARRS 1	·	1.1 km	MPC · JPL
819387	2014 HK_{181}	—	April 30, 2014	Haleakala	Pan-STARRS 1	·	1.5 km	MPC · JPL
819388	2014 HM_{183}	—	April 5, 2014	Haleakala	Pan-STARRS 1	·	860 m	MPC · JPL
819389	2014 HO_{183}	—	March 29, 2000	Kitt Peak	Spacewatch	·	490 m	MPC · JPL
819390	2014 HA_{185}	—	April 25, 2003	Kitt Peak	Spacewatch	·	810 m	MPC · JPL
819391	2014 HQ_{187}	—	April 20, 2010	Kitt Peak	Spacewatch	·	760 m	MPC · JPL
819392	2014 HR_{187}	—	April 4, 2014	Kitt Peak	Spacewatch	PHO	710 m	MPC · JPL
819393	2014 HK_{188}	—	April 5, 2014	Haleakala	Pan-STARRS 1	V	480 m	MPC · JPL
819394	2014 HY_{200}	—	April 30, 2014	Haleakala	Pan-STARRS 1	H	430 m	MPC · JPL
819395	2014 HU_{201}	—	April 30, 2014	Haleakala	Pan-STARRS 1	·	2.3 km	MPC · JPL
819396	2014 HZ_{204}	—	April 2, 2014	Mount Lemmon	Mount Lemmon Survey	·	970 m	MPC · JPL
819397	2014 HO_{205}	—	April 25, 2014	Mount Lemmon	Mount Lemmon Survey	·	1.8 km	MPC · JPL
819398	2014 HZ_{206}	—	April 30, 2014	Haleakala	Pan-STARRS 1	THM	1.6 km	MPC · JPL
819399	2014 HR_{207}	—	April 30, 2014	Haleakala	Pan-STARRS 1	·	1.3 km	MPC · JPL
819400	2014 HA_{208}	—	February 18, 2010	Kitt Peak	Spacewatch	·	850 m	MPC · JPL

== 819401–819500 ==
back to top

Designation			Discovery			Properties		Ref
Permanent	Provisional	Named after	Date	Site	Discoverer(s)	Category	Diam.	Ref
819401	2014 HG_{208}	—	April 30, 2014	Haleakala	Pan-STARRS 1	·	2.1 km	MPC · JPL
819402	2014 HR_{211}	—	April 30, 2014	Haleakala	Pan-STARRS 1	H	370 m	MPC · JPL
819403	2014 HV_{211}	—	April 30, 2014	Haleakala	Pan-STARRS 1	·	2.0 km	MPC · JPL
819404	2014 HD_{212}	—	April 23, 2014	Haleakala	Pan-STARRS 1	·	1.9 km	MPC · JPL
819405	2014 HL_{214}	—	April 23, 2014	Haleakala	Pan-STARRS 1	·	1.9 km	MPC · JPL
819406	2014 HG_{215}	—	April 30, 2014	Haleakala	Pan-STARRS 1	·	940 m	MPC · JPL
819407	2014 HN_{215}	—	April 25, 2014	Mount Lemmon	Mount Lemmon Survey	·	800 m	MPC · JPL
819408	2014 HC_{216}	—	April 29, 2014	Haleakala	Pan-STARRS 1	EOS	1.5 km	MPC · JPL
819409	2014 HG_{216}	—	April 30, 2014	Haleakala	Pan-STARRS 1	·	1.4 km	MPC · JPL
819410	2014 HG_{219}	—	April 30, 2014	Haleakala	Pan-STARRS 1	·	730 m	MPC · JPL
819411	2014 HQ_{219}	—	April 21, 2014	Kitt Peak	Spacewatch	·	910 m	MPC · JPL
819412	2014 HU_{219}	—	April 21, 2014	Mount Lemmon	Mount Lemmon Survey	·	1.6 km	MPC · JPL
819413	2014 HF_{220}	—	April 23, 2014	Haleakala	Pan-STARRS 1	·	2.1 km	MPC · JPL
819414	2014 HK_{220}	—	April 23, 2014	Haleakala	Pan-STARRS 1	PHO	620 m	MPC · JPL
819415	2014 HL_{220}	—	April 29, 2014	Haleakala	Pan-STARRS 1	H	380 m	MPC · JPL
819416	2014 HW_{221}	—	April 24, 2014	Haleakala	Pan-STARRS 1	KON	1.6 km	MPC · JPL
819417	2014 HZ_{222}	—	April 23, 2014	Cerro Tololo-DECam	DECam	MAS	490 m	MPC · JPL
819418	2014 HC_{223}	—	April 29, 2014	Haleakala	Pan-STARRS 1	·	1.2 km	MPC · JPL
819419	2014 HO_{223}	—	April 23, 2014	Mount Lemmon	Mount Lemmon Survey	H	420 m	MPC · JPL
819420	2014 HR_{223}	—	April 24, 2014	Mount Lemmon	Mount Lemmon Survey	·	1.1 km	MPC · JPL
819421	2014 HD_{225}	—	April 23, 2014	Haleakala	Pan-STARRS 1	·	1.8 km	MPC · JPL
819422	2014 HE_{226}	—	April 28, 2014	Haleakala	Pan-STARRS 1	GAL	1.5 km	MPC · JPL
819423	2014 HK_{226}	—	April 30, 2014	Mount Lemmon	Mount Lemmon Survey	·	1.7 km	MPC · JPL
819424	2014 HR_{229}	—	April 28, 2014	Mount Lemmon	Mount Lemmon Survey	·	1.6 km	MPC · JPL
819425	2014 HE_{231}	—	April 29, 2014	Haleakala	Pan-STARRS 1	·	770 m	MPC · JPL
819426	2014 HA_{232}	—	April 30, 2014	Haleakala	Pan-STARRS 1	·	2.0 km	MPC · JPL
819427	2014 HD_{232}	—	April 23, 2014	Mount Lemmon	Mount Lemmon Survey	·	1.9 km	MPC · JPL
819428	2014 HS_{232}	—	April 24, 2014	Mount Lemmon	Mount Lemmon Survey	·	2.2 km	MPC · JPL
819429	2014 HA_{234}	—	April 24, 2014	Haleakala	Pan-STARRS 1	·	1.1 km	MPC · JPL
819430	2014 HE_{235}	—	April 24, 2014	Mount Lemmon	Mount Lemmon Survey	·	1.7 km	MPC · JPL
819431	2014 HX_{235}	—	April 22, 2014	Kitt Peak	Spacewatch	·	2.4 km	MPC · JPL
819432	2014 HV_{239}	—	April 30, 2014	Haleakala	Pan-STARRS 1	·	870 m	MPC · JPL
819433	2014 HK_{240}	—	April 29, 2014	Haleakala	Pan-STARRS 1	·	520 m	MPC · JPL
819434	2014 HE_{243}	—	May 23, 2014	Haleakala	Pan-STARRS 1	·	2.0 km	MPC · JPL
819435	2014 HB_{244}	—	April 5, 2014	Haleakala	Pan-STARRS 1	·	840 m	MPC · JPL
819436	2014 HH_{256}	—	May 23, 2014	Haleakala	Pan-STARRS 1	·	2.0 km	MPC · JPL
819437	2014 HQ_{257}	—	November 7, 2015	Mount Lemmon	Mount Lemmon Survey	MAS	530 m	MPC · JPL
819438	2014 HY_{271}	—	April 23, 2014	Cerro Tololo	DECam	·	830 m	MPC · JPL
819439	2014 HW_{281}	—	April 24, 2014	Cerro Tololo-DECam	DECam	EOS	1.4 km	MPC · JPL
819440	2014 HE_{305}	—	October 24, 2015	Mount Lemmon	Mount Lemmon Survey	NYS	650 m	MPC · JPL
819441	2014 HB_{314}	—	November 1, 2011	Kitt Peak	Spacewatch	·	2.3 km	MPC · JPL
819442	2014 HJ_{320}	—	October 25, 2008	Kitt Peak	Spacewatch	·	1.1 km	MPC · JPL
819443	2014 HB_{467}	—	April 30, 2014	Haleakala	Pan-STARRS 1	·	2.1 km	MPC · JPL
819444	2014 HF_{529}	—	April 24, 2014	Cerro Tololo	DECam	·	810 m	MPC · JPL
819445	2014 JK_{4}	—	April 4, 2014	Haleakala	Pan-STARRS 1	·	1.2 km	MPC · JPL
819446	2014 JZ_{5}	—	April 5, 2014	Haleakala	Pan-STARRS 1	H	350 m	MPC · JPL
819447	2014 JS_{7}	—	May 3, 2014	Mount Lemmon	Mount Lemmon Survey	·	760 m	MPC · JPL
819448	2014 JT_{7}	—	May 3, 2014	Mount Lemmon	Mount Lemmon Survey	MAS	520 m	MPC · JPL
819449	2014 JF_{8}	—	April 29, 2014	ESA OGS	ESA OGS	·	1.0 km	MPC · JPL
819450	2014 JQ_{8}	—	October 2, 2008	Kitt Peak	Spacewatch	PHO	630 m	MPC · JPL
819451	2014 JX_{8}	—	May 15, 2007	Kitt Peak	Spacewatch	·	510 m	MPC · JPL
819452	2014 JT_{9}	—	May 3, 2014	Mount Lemmon	Mount Lemmon Survey	KOR	990 m	MPC · JPL
819453	2014 JE_{10}	—	May 3, 2014	Mount Lemmon	Mount Lemmon Survey	·	950 m	MPC · JPL
819454	2014 JH_{13}	—	May 3, 2014	Mount Lemmon	Mount Lemmon Survey	615	1.1 km	MPC · JPL
819455	2014 JO_{14}	—	May 3, 2014	Mount Lemmon	Mount Lemmon Survey	·	740 m	MPC · JPL
819456	2014 JW_{15}	—	April 4, 2014	Haleakala	Pan-STARRS 1	ERI	1.3 km	MPC · JPL
819457	2014 JC_{16}	—	April 24, 2014	Haleakala	Pan-STARRS 1	MAS	530 m	MPC · JPL
819458	2014 JX_{16}	—	February 28, 2014	Haleakala	Pan-STARRS 1	·	1.4 km	MPC · JPL
819459	2014 JL_{17}	—	May 3, 2014	Mount Lemmon	Mount Lemmon Survey	·	1 km	MPC · JPL
819460	2014 JB_{18}	—	April 1, 2014	Kitt Peak	Spacewatch	MAS	670 m	MPC · JPL
819461	2014 JO_{18}	—	March 26, 2007	Mount Lemmon	Mount Lemmon Survey	·	650 m	MPC · JPL
819462	2014 JQ_{18}	—	February 17, 2010	Kitt Peak	Spacewatch	·	800 m	MPC · JPL
819463	2014 JA_{19}	—	January 23, 2006	Mount Lemmon	Mount Lemmon Survey	NYS	900 m	MPC · JPL
819464	2014 JD_{19}	—	April 4, 2014	Haleakala	Pan-STARRS 1	·	790 m	MPC · JPL
819465	2014 JL_{22}	—	April 26, 2003	Kitt Peak	Spacewatch	·	1.6 km	MPC · JPL
819466	2014 JM_{24}	—	April 24, 2014	Kitt Peak	Spacewatch	·	780 m	MPC · JPL
819467	2014 JL_{28}	—	May 5, 2014	Kitt Peak	Spacewatch	·	1.3 km	MPC · JPL
819468	2014 JS_{30}	—	May 7, 2014	Mount Lemmon	Mount Lemmon Survey	H	450 m	MPC · JPL
819469	2014 JJ_{31}	—	May 2, 2014	Kitt Peak	Spacewatch	·	1.8 km	MPC · JPL
819470	2014 JZ_{32}	—	September 26, 2011	Haleakala	Pan-STARRS 1	MAS	610 m	MPC · JPL
819471	2014 JU_{34}	—	May 4, 2014	Mount Lemmon	Mount Lemmon Survey	·	2.0 km	MPC · JPL
819472	2014 JR_{35}	—	May 4, 2014	Haleakala	Pan-STARRS 1	·	1.3 km	MPC · JPL
819473	2014 JX_{35}	—	May 4, 2014	Haleakala	Pan-STARRS 1	·	710 m	MPC · JPL
819474	2014 JC_{36}	—	May 4, 2014	Haleakala	Pan-STARRS 1	LIX	2.9 km	MPC · JPL
819475	2014 JG_{36}	—	December 24, 2005	Kitt Peak	Spacewatch	·	920 m	MPC · JPL
819476	2014 JU_{38}	—	May 4, 2014	Haleakala	Pan-STARRS 1	·	1.5 km	MPC · JPL
819477	2014 JN_{39}	—	May 3, 2014	Mount Lemmon	Mount Lemmon Survey	EUN	930 m	MPC · JPL
819478	2014 JR_{39}	—	May 4, 2014	Haleakala	Pan-STARRS 1	·	650 m	MPC · JPL
819479	2014 JT_{39}	—	January 30, 2006	Kitt Peak	Spacewatch	·	860 m	MPC · JPL
819480	2014 JU_{40}	—	April 10, 2014	Haleakala	Pan-STARRS 1	·	730 m	MPC · JPL
819481	2014 JW_{45}	—	May 6, 2014	Mount Lemmon	Mount Lemmon Survey	·	1.8 km	MPC · JPL
819482	2014 JS_{46}	—	February 15, 2010	Kitt Peak	Spacewatch	·	950 m	MPC · JPL
819483	2014 JA_{48}	—	February 10, 2013	Haleakala	Pan-STARRS 1	·	820 m	MPC · JPL
819484	2014 JH_{48}	—	May 6, 2014	Haleakala	Pan-STARRS 1	·	820 m	MPC · JPL
819485	2014 JV_{48}	—	May 8, 2014	Haleakala	Pan-STARRS 1	·	1.9 km	MPC · JPL
819486	2014 JC_{49}	—	April 30, 2014	Haleakala	Pan-STARRS 1	·	810 m	MPC · JPL
819487	2014 JC_{50}	—	October 10, 2012	Mount Lemmon	Mount Lemmon Survey	H	390 m	MPC · JPL
819488	2014 JL_{50}	—	February 9, 2010	Kitt Peak	Spacewatch	·	790 m	MPC · JPL
819489	2014 JS_{50}	—	May 8, 2014	Kitt Peak	Spacewatch	MAR	740 m	MPC · JPL
819490	2014 JU_{50}	—	April 2, 2014	Mount Lemmon	Mount Lemmon Survey	H	430 m	MPC · JPL
819491	2014 JG_{51}	—	May 4, 2014	Haleakala	Pan-STARRS 1	·	2.4 km	MPC · JPL
819492	2014 JM_{51}	—	May 3, 2014	Mount Lemmon	Mount Lemmon Survey	CLA	1.1 km	MPC · JPL
819493	2014 JN_{53}	—	May 8, 2014	Haleakala	Pan-STARRS 1	·	910 m	MPC · JPL
819494	2014 JF_{54}	—	May 8, 2014	Haleakala	Pan-STARRS 1	·	1.5 km	MPC · JPL
819495	2014 JL_{54}	—	May 6, 2014	Haleakala	Pan-STARRS 1	H	430 m	MPC · JPL
819496	2014 JA_{59}	—	April 6, 2014	Mount Lemmon	Mount Lemmon Survey	·	1.2 km	MPC · JPL
819497	2014 JP_{59}	—	April 30, 2014	ESA OGS	ESA OGS	·	800 m	MPC · JPL
819498	2014 JR_{59}	—	September 23, 2008	Mount Lemmon	Mount Lemmon Survey	·	500 m	MPC · JPL
819499	2014 JY_{59}	—	September 24, 2011	Haleakala	Pan-STARRS 1	ERI	950 m	MPC · JPL
819500	2014 JC_{60}	—	April 25, 2014	Mount Lemmon	Mount Lemmon Survey	·	840 m	MPC · JPL

== 819501–819600 ==
back to top

Designation			Discovery			Properties		Ref
Permanent	Provisional	Named after	Date	Site	Discoverer(s)	Category	Diam.	Ref
819501	2014 JS_{60}	—	March 14, 2010	Mount Lemmon	Mount Lemmon Survey	·	820 m	MPC · JPL
819502	2014 JY_{60}	—	May 6, 2014	Mount Lemmon	Mount Lemmon Survey	·	1.9 km	MPC · JPL
819503	2014 JN_{61}	—	May 7, 2014	Haleakala	Pan-STARRS 1	TIR · critical	1.6 km	MPC · JPL
819504	2014 JO_{67}	—	April 4, 2014	Haleakala	Pan-STARRS 1	·	1.1 km	MPC · JPL
819505	2014 JS_{67}	—	May 8, 2014	Haleakala	Pan-STARRS 1	·	510 m	MPC · JPL
819506	2014 JQ_{69}	—	April 25, 2014	Mount Lemmon	Mount Lemmon Survey	NYS	820 m	MPC · JPL
819507	2014 JX_{69}	—	April 30, 2014	Haleakala	Pan-STARRS 1	·	1 km	MPC · JPL
819508	2014 JB_{71}	—	May 8, 2014	Haleakala	Pan-STARRS 1	·	990 m	MPC · JPL
819509	2014 JF_{73}	—	September 11, 2007	Kitt Peak	Spacewatch	·	790 m	MPC · JPL
819510	2014 JN_{73}	—	April 30, 2014	Haleakala	Pan-STARRS 1	TIR	1.8 km	MPC · JPL
819511	2014 JR_{73}	—	May 8, 2014	Haleakala	Pan-STARRS 1	·	830 m	MPC · JPL
819512	2014 JV_{74}	—	March 12, 2010	Mount Lemmon	Mount Lemmon Survey	MAS	530 m	MPC · JPL
819513	2014 JS_{75}	—	April 30, 2014	Haleakala	Pan-STARRS 1	NYS	660 m	MPC · JPL
819514	2014 JT_{75}	—	February 24, 2006	Kitt Peak	Spacewatch	NYS	1.1 km	MPC · JPL
819515	2014 JY_{76}	—	January 5, 2013	Kitt Peak	Spacewatch	·	1.8 km	MPC · JPL
819516	2014 JE_{77}	—	April 29, 2014	ESA OGS	ESA OGS	·	1.0 km	MPC · JPL
819517	2014 JC_{81}	—	May 7, 2014	Mount Lemmon	Mount Lemmon Survey	H	430 m	MPC · JPL
819518	2014 JT_{81}	—	May 6, 2014	Haleakala	Pan-STARRS 1	H	410 m	MPC · JPL
819519	2014 JK_{82}	—	May 3, 2014	Haleakala	Pan-STARRS 1	·	2.4 km	MPC · JPL
819520	2014 JT_{82}	—	May 4, 2014	Haleakala	Pan-STARRS 1	·	1.6 km	MPC · JPL
819521	2014 JU_{82}	—	May 5, 2014	Kitt Peak	Spacewatch	·	1.7 km	MPC · JPL
819522	2014 JZ_{82}	—	May 6, 2014	Haleakala	Pan-STARRS 1	KON	1.5 km	MPC · JPL
819523	2014 JE_{86}	—	May 4, 2014	Haleakala	Pan-STARRS 1	·	800 m	MPC · JPL
819524	2014 JQ_{87}	—	May 2, 2014	Mount Lemmon	Mount Lemmon Survey	·	810 m	MPC · JPL
819525	2014 JD_{89}	—	May 6, 2014	Haleakala	Pan-STARRS 1	·	1.8 km	MPC · JPL
819526	2014 JR_{89}	—	May 6, 2014	Haleakala	Pan-STARRS 1	·	760 m	MPC · JPL
819527	2014 JF_{90}	—	May 8, 2014	Haleakala	Pan-STARRS 1	·	1.1 km	MPC · JPL
819528	2014 JK_{90}	—	December 2, 2005	Mauna Kea	A. Boattini	·	950 m	MPC · JPL
819529	2014 JQ_{90}	—	May 8, 2014	Haleakala	Pan-STARRS 1	·	2.0 km	MPC · JPL
819530	2014 JP_{91}	—	May 10, 2014	Haleakala	Pan-STARRS 1	·	850 m	MPC · JPL
819531	2014 JK_{92}	—	May 9, 2014	Haleakala	Pan-STARRS 1	·	1.4 km	MPC · JPL
819532	2014 JC_{93}	—	May 10, 2014	Haleakala	Pan-STARRS 1	·	690 m	MPC · JPL
819533	2014 JO_{93}	—	June 25, 2003	Palomar	NEAT	PHO	980 m	MPC · JPL
819534	2014 JN_{95}	—	May 8, 2014	Haleakala	Pan-STARRS 1	·	2.2 km	MPC · JPL
819535	2014 JJ_{98}	—	May 7, 2014	Haleakala	Pan-STARRS 1	LIX	2.0 km	MPC · JPL
819536	2014 JF_{100}	—	May 9, 2014	Haleakala	Pan-STARRS 1	·	660 m	MPC · JPL
819537	2014 JO_{100}	—	May 7, 2014	Haleakala	Pan-STARRS 1	(1547)	1.0 km	MPC · JPL
819538	2014 JY_{100}	—	October 9, 2015	Haleakala	Pan-STARRS 1	(5)	1.0 km	MPC · JPL
819539	2014 JD_{101}	—	May 10, 2014	Haleakala	Pan-STARRS 1	·	1.7 km	MPC · JPL
819540	2014 JH_{101}	—	May 4, 2014	Mount Lemmon	Mount Lemmon Survey	·	730 m	MPC · JPL
819541	2014 JE_{103}	—	May 6, 2014	Mount Lemmon	Mount Lemmon Survey	·	1.8 km	MPC · JPL
819542	2014 JG_{104}	—	May 4, 2014	Haleakala	Pan-STARRS 1	·	920 m	MPC · JPL
819543	2014 JB_{105}	—	May 3, 2014	Mount Lemmon	Mount Lemmon Survey	NYS	710 m	MPC · JPL
819544	2014 JK_{105}	—	May 2, 2014	Kitt Peak	Spacewatch	·	1.3 km	MPC · JPL
819545	2014 JN_{105}	—	May 3, 2014	Kitt Peak	Spacewatch	·	1.6 km	MPC · JPL
819546	2014 JV_{105}	—	May 2, 2014	Mount Lemmon	Mount Lemmon Survey	MAS	540 m	MPC · JPL
819547	2014 JZ_{105}	—	May 2, 2014	Mount Lemmon	Mount Lemmon Survey	NYS	750 m	MPC · JPL
819548	2014 JC_{106}	—	May 8, 2014	Haleakala	Pan-STARRS 1	·	1.9 km	MPC · JPL
819549	2014 JW_{106}	—	May 8, 2014	Haleakala	Pan-STARRS 1	EOS	1.5 km	MPC · JPL
819550	2014 JA_{107}	—	May 7, 2014	Haleakala	Pan-STARRS 1	TIR	1.7 km	MPC · JPL
819551	2014 JB_{107}	—	May 7, 2014	Haleakala	Pan-STARRS 1	·	1.9 km	MPC · JPL
819552	2014 JM_{109}	—	May 10, 2014	Haleakala	Pan-STARRS 1	·	1.6 km	MPC · JPL
819553	2014 JR_{109}	—	May 4, 2014	Haleakala	Pan-STARRS 1	·	2.0 km	MPC · JPL
819554	2014 JC_{110}	—	May 8, 2014	Haleakala	Pan-STARRS 1	·	1.8 km	MPC · JPL
819555	2014 JO_{110}	—	May 8, 2014	Haleakala	Pan-STARRS 1	·	1.8 km	MPC · JPL
819556	2014 JS_{110}	—	May 4, 2014	Haleakala	Pan-STARRS 1	·	1.9 km	MPC · JPL
819557	2014 JN_{116}	—	May 8, 2014	Haleakala	Pan-STARRS 1	·	2.0 km	MPC · JPL
819558	2014 JD_{119}	—	May 10, 2014	Haleakala	Pan-STARRS 1	MAS	510 m	MPC · JPL
819559	2014 JS_{120}	—	May 8, 2014	Haleakala	Pan-STARRS 1	THM	1.6 km	MPC · JPL
819560	2014 JC_{122}	—	May 4, 2014	Haleakala	Pan-STARRS 1	·	2.2 km	MPC · JPL
819561	2014 JX_{122}	—	May 6, 2014	Haleakala	Pan-STARRS 1	·	2.2 km	MPC · JPL
819562	2014 JH_{123}	—	May 7, 2014	Haleakala	Pan-STARRS 1	·	1.8 km	MPC · JPL
819563	2014 JQ_{126}	—	May 7, 2014	Haleakala	Pan-STARRS 1	·	1.8 km	MPC · JPL
819564	2014 JU_{126}	—	May 7, 2014	Haleakala	Pan-STARRS 1	·	1.7 km	MPC · JPL
819565	2014 JH_{128}	—	May 4, 2014	Haleakala	Pan-STARRS 1	·	2.0 km	MPC · JPL
819566	2014 JC_{130}	—	May 2, 2014	Mount Lemmon	Mount Lemmon Survey	NYS	880 m	MPC · JPL
819567	2014 JM_{132}	—	May 5, 2014	Haleakala	Pan-STARRS 1	·	1.1 km	MPC · JPL
819568	2014 JF_{134}	—	May 6, 2014	Haleakala	Pan-STARRS 1	·	900 m	MPC · JPL
819569	2014 JQ_{134}	—	May 8, 2014	Haleakala	Pan-STARRS 1	EOS	1.5 km	MPC · JPL
819570	2014 JN_{140}	—	May 8, 2014	Haleakala	Pan-STARRS 1	·	2.2 km	MPC · JPL
819571	2014 JL_{147}	—	May 7, 2014	Haleakala	Pan-STARRS 1	·	1.8 km	MPC · JPL
819572	2014 JF_{155}	—	May 8, 2014	Haleakala	Pan-STARRS 1	·	2.0 km	MPC · JPL
819573	2014 JM_{155}	—	May 7, 2014	Haleakala	Pan-STARRS 1	·	2.0 km	MPC · JPL
819574	2014 KB	—	April 26, 2014	Mount Lemmon	Mount Lemmon Survey	H	410 m	MPC · JPL
819575	2014 KX	—	March 29, 2014	Kitt Peak	Spacewatch	BRG	1.1 km	MPC · JPL
819576	2014 KA_{5}	—	April 5, 2014	Haleakala	Pan-STARRS 1	·	1.6 km	MPC · JPL
819577	2014 KN_{7}	—	October 12, 2005	Kitt Peak	Spacewatch	·	2.0 km	MPC · JPL
819578	2014 KZ_{7}	—	March 18, 2010	Mount Lemmon	Mount Lemmon Survey	·	1.0 km	MPC · JPL
819579	2014 KZ_{8}	—	August 27, 2011	Haleakala	Pan-STARRS 1	·	680 m	MPC · JPL
819580	2014 KD_{9}	—	September 26, 2011	Haleakala	Pan-STARRS 1	·	1.0 km	MPC · JPL
819581	2014 KL_{9}	—	November 15, 2006	Mount Lemmon	Mount Lemmon Survey	·	1.7 km	MPC · JPL
819582	2014 KA_{10}	—	May 10, 2014	Haleakala	Pan-STARRS 1	·	940 m	MPC · JPL
819583	2014 KN_{16}	—	September 11, 2007	Mount Lemmon	Mount Lemmon Survey	NYS	850 m	MPC · JPL
819584	2014 KJ_{17}	—	November 24, 2011	Haleakala	Pan-STARRS 1	·	1.0 km	MPC · JPL
819585	2014 KP_{17}	—	May 7, 2014	Haleakala	Pan-STARRS 1	PHO	620 m	MPC · JPL
819586	2014 KT_{17}	—	May 7, 2014	Haleakala	Pan-STARRS 1	·	720 m	MPC · JPL
819587	2014 KC_{20}	—	May 4, 2014	Haleakala	Pan-STARRS 1	·	1.2 km	MPC · JPL
819588	2014 KV_{22}	—	February 28, 2014	Haleakala	Pan-STARRS 1	·	910 m	MPC · JPL
819589	2014 KC_{23}	—	May 20, 2014	Haleakala	Pan-STARRS 1	·	1.4 km	MPC · JPL
819590	2014 KF_{23}	—	September 11, 2004	Kitt Peak	Spacewatch	·	1.7 km	MPC · JPL
819591	2014 KG_{23}	—	May 8, 2014	Haleakala	Pan-STARRS 1	·	1.8 km	MPC · JPL
819592	2014 KM_{25}	—	March 12, 2014	Haleakala	Pan-STARRS 1	·	1.1 km	MPC · JPL
819593	2014 KJ_{26}	—	May 3, 2014	Kitt Peak	Spacewatch	·	700 m	MPC · JPL
819594	2014 KC_{27}	—	May 21, 2014	Haleakala	Pan-STARRS 1	·	730 m	MPC · JPL
819595	2014 KF_{31}	—	May 22, 2014	Haleakala	Pan-STARRS 1	·	830 m	MPC · JPL
819596	2014 KS_{31}	—	January 6, 2013	Mount Lemmon	Mount Lemmon Survey	·	1.5 km	MPC · JPL
819597	2014 KL_{32}	—	May 22, 2014	Mount Lemmon	Mount Lemmon Survey	·	870 m	MPC · JPL
819598	2014 KT_{34}	—	December 30, 2008	Mount Lemmon	Mount Lemmon Survey	·	1.4 km	MPC · JPL
819599	2014 KF_{36}	—	February 2, 2009	Mount Lemmon	Mount Lemmon Survey	·	1.6 km	MPC · JPL
819600	2014 KO_{36}	—	March 29, 2014	Haleakala	Pan-STARRS 1	H	450 m	MPC · JPL

== 819601–819700 ==
back to top

Designation			Discovery			Properties		Ref
Permanent	Provisional	Named after	Date	Site	Discoverer(s)	Category	Diam.	Ref
819601	2014 KK_{39}	—	May 21, 2014	Catalina	CSS	H	540 m	MPC · JPL
819602	2014 KT_{39}	—	October 5, 2012	Haleakala	Pan-STARRS 1	H	450 m	MPC · JPL
819603	2014 KZ_{41}	—	May 19, 2010	Mount Lemmon	Mount Lemmon Survey	·	1.1 km	MPC · JPL
819604	2014 KQ_{44}	—	September 10, 2007	Mount Lemmon	Mount Lemmon Survey	PHO	740 m	MPC · JPL
819605	2014 KQ_{46}	—	April 5, 2014	Haleakala	Pan-STARRS 1	·	1.1 km	MPC · JPL
819606	2014 KM_{47}	—	April 5, 2014	Haleakala	Pan-STARRS 1	MAS	490 m	MPC · JPL
819607	2014 KJ_{49}	—	August 16, 2002	Kitt Peak	Spacewatch	·	670 m	MPC · JPL
819608	2014 KY_{52}	—	June 25, 2011	Kitt Peak	Spacewatch	·	490 m	MPC · JPL
819609	2014 KH_{54}	—	October 23, 2012	Mount Lemmon	Mount Lemmon Survey	H	350 m	MPC · JPL
819610	2014 KS_{54}	—	May 6, 2014	Haleakala	Pan-STARRS 1	·	810 m	MPC · JPL
819611	2014 KC_{55}	—	October 17, 2010	Mount Lemmon	Mount Lemmon Survey	·	2.1 km	MPC · JPL
819612	2014 KF_{56}	—	May 7, 2014	Haleakala	Pan-STARRS 1	·	1.9 km	MPC · JPL
819613	2014 KH_{56}	—	May 7, 2014	Haleakala	Pan-STARRS 1	·	740 m	MPC · JPL
819614	2014 KM_{57}	—	May 7, 2014	Haleakala	Pan-STARRS 1	·	930 m	MPC · JPL
819615	2014 KQ_{58}	—	May 6, 2014	Haleakala	Pan-STARRS 1	TIR	2.1 km	MPC · JPL
819616	2014 KQ_{59}	—	May 9, 2014	Haleakala	Pan-STARRS 1	·	2.1 km	MPC · JPL
819617	2014 KR_{63}	—	May 21, 2014	Haleakala	Pan-STARRS 1	NYS	900 m	MPC · JPL
819618	2014 KZ_{63}	—	May 21, 2014	Haleakala	Pan-STARRS 1	·	2.2 km	MPC · JPL
819619	2014 KV_{67}	—	May 7, 2014	Haleakala	Pan-STARRS 1	·	910 m	MPC · JPL
819620	2014 KH_{68}	—	May 23, 2014	Kitt Peak	Spacewatch	·	2.7 km	MPC · JPL
819621	2014 KV_{69}	—	May 7, 2014	Haleakala	Pan-STARRS 1	·	1.7 km	MPC · JPL
819622	2014 KG_{70}	—	May 23, 2014	Haleakala	Pan-STARRS 1	·	2.0 km	MPC · JPL
819623	2014 KH_{70}	—	May 23, 2014	Haleakala	Pan-STARRS 1	·	1.8 km	MPC · JPL
819624	2014 KU_{70}	—	May 23, 2014	Haleakala	Pan-STARRS 1	·	920 m	MPC · JPL
819625	2014 KV_{71}	—	May 23, 2014	Haleakala	Pan-STARRS 1	·	2.3 km	MPC · JPL
819626	2014 KE_{72}	—	May 23, 2014	Haleakala	Pan-STARRS 1	·	1.5 km	MPC · JPL
819627	2014 KJ_{76}	—	May 21, 2014	Haleakala	Pan-STARRS 1	H	430 m	MPC · JPL
819628	2014 KB_{78}	—	May 9, 2014	Mount Lemmon	Mount Lemmon Survey	·	2.5 km	MPC · JPL
819629	2014 KD_{79}	—	September 18, 2011	Mount Lemmon	Mount Lemmon Survey	·	680 m	MPC · JPL
819630	2014 KW_{79}	—	October 18, 2011	Mount Lemmon	Mount Lemmon Survey	NYS	760 m	MPC · JPL
819631	2014 KC_{80}	—	October 7, 2008	Mount Lemmon	Mount Lemmon Survey	·	540 m	MPC · JPL
819632	2014 KE_{82}	—	September 24, 2011	Kitt Peak	Spacewatch	NYS	640 m	MPC · JPL
819633	2014 KN_{89}	—	February 7, 2006	Kitt Peak	Spacewatch	·	870 m	MPC · JPL
819634	2014 KZ_{97}	—	May 28, 2014	Mount Lemmon	Mount Lemmon Survey	T_{j} (2.98)	2.3 km	MPC · JPL
819635	2014 KA_{99}	—	April 30, 2014	Haleakala	Pan-STARRS 1	·	770 m	MPC · JPL
819636	2014 KP_{102}	—	May 21, 2014	Haleakala	Pan-STARRS 1	H	330 m	MPC · JPL
819637	2014 KU_{102}	—	May 21, 2014	Haleakala	Pan-STARRS 1	·	2.2 km	MPC · JPL
819638	2014 KK_{103}	—	May 23, 2014	Haleakala	Pan-STARRS 1	·	2.3 km	MPC · JPL
819639	2014 KR_{109}	—	May 23, 2014	Haleakala	Pan-STARRS 1	·	2.1 km	MPC · JPL
819640	2014 KW_{109}	—	May 23, 2014	Haleakala	Pan-STARRS 1	·	810 m	MPC · JPL
819641	2014 KJ_{112}	—	January 1, 2009	Kitt Peak	Spacewatch	·	1.2 km	MPC · JPL
819642	2014 KK_{112}	—	September 18, 2010	Mount Lemmon	Mount Lemmon Survey	·	1.9 km	MPC · JPL
819643	2014 KP_{113}	—	November 28, 2017	Mount Lemmon	Mount Lemmon Survey	·	1.2 km	MPC · JPL
819644	2014 KQ_{114}	—	May 21, 2014	Haleakala	Pan-STARRS 1	·	920 m	MPC · JPL
819645	2014 KX_{114}	—	May 21, 2014	Haleakala	Pan-STARRS 1	·	700 m	MPC · JPL
819646	2014 KP_{115}	—	May 30, 2014	Haleakala	Pan-STARRS 1	·	1.4 km	MPC · JPL
819647	2014 KO_{117}	—	May 23, 2014	Haleakala	Pan-STARRS 1	·	970 m	MPC · JPL
819648	2014 KK_{118}	—	May 31, 2014	Haleakala	Pan-STARRS 1	·	1.9 km	MPC · JPL
819649	2014 KX_{118}	—	April 28, 2017	Haleakala	Pan-STARRS 1	H	430 m	MPC · JPL
819650	2014 KA_{120}	—	May 21, 2014	Haleakala	Pan-STARRS 1	·	600 m	MPC · JPL
819651	2014 KO_{120}	—	May 23, 2014	Kitt Peak	Spacewatch	·	760 m	MPC · JPL
819652	2014 KW_{120}	—	May 23, 2014	Haleakala	Pan-STARRS 1	·	1.7 km	MPC · JPL
819653	2014 KG_{121}	—	May 26, 2014	Haleakala	Pan-STARRS 1	·	2.0 km	MPC · JPL
819654	2014 KQ_{121}	—	May 21, 2014	Haleakala	Pan-STARRS 1	·	2.0 km	MPC · JPL
819655	2014 KT_{121}	—	May 21, 2014	Haleakala	Pan-STARRS 1	·	1.6 km	MPC · JPL
819656	2014 KO_{122}	—	May 7, 2014	Haleakala	Pan-STARRS 1	·	1.6 km	MPC · JPL
819657	2014 KU_{122}	—	May 28, 2014	Haleakala	Pan-STARRS 1	V	480 m	MPC · JPL
819658	2014 KR_{124}	—	May 7, 2014	Haleakala	Pan-STARRS 1	·	1.8 km	MPC · JPL
819659	2014 KT_{124}	—	May 23, 2014	Haleakala	Pan-STARRS 1	·	1.8 km	MPC · JPL
819660	2014 KY_{124}	—	May 20, 2014	Haleakala	Pan-STARRS 1	·	1.1 km	MPC · JPL
819661	2014 KB_{125}	—	May 27, 2014	Haleakala	Pan-STARRS 1	PHO	760 m	MPC · JPL
819662	2014 KP_{126}	—	May 23, 2014	Haleakala	Pan-STARRS 1	·	830 m	MPC · JPL
819663	2014 KG_{128}	—	May 21, 2014	Mount Lemmon	Mount Lemmon Survey	·	1.6 km	MPC · JPL
819664	2014 KS_{128}	—	May 21, 2014	Haleakala	Pan-STARRS 1	V	420 m	MPC · JPL
819665	2014 KG_{129}	—	May 7, 2014	Haleakala	Pan-STARRS 1	·	2.1 km	MPC · JPL
819666	2014 KA_{132}	—	May 24, 2014	Haleakala	Pan-STARRS 1	·	950 m	MPC · JPL
819667	2014 KZ_{132}	—	May 23, 2014	Haleakala	Pan-STARRS 1	H	380 m	MPC · JPL
819668	2014 KN_{134}	—	May 21, 2014	Haleakala	Pan-STARRS 1	·	740 m	MPC · JPL
819669	2014 KP_{135}	—	May 21, 2014	Haleakala	Pan-STARRS 1	·	850 m	MPC · JPL
819670	2014 KQ_{135}	—	May 20, 2014	Haleakala	Pan-STARRS 1	·	670 m	MPC · JPL
819671	2014 KD_{136}	—	May 26, 2014	Haleakala	Pan-STARRS 1	·	2.2 km	MPC · JPL
819672	2014 KF_{136}	—	May 28, 2014	Haleakala	Pan-STARRS 1	·	830 m	MPC · JPL
819673	2014 KA_{137}	—	May 21, 2014	Haleakala	Pan-STARRS 1	NYS	950 m	MPC · JPL
819674	2014 KK_{137}	—	May 21, 2014	Haleakala	Pan-STARRS 1	·	2.5 km	MPC · JPL
819675	2014 KN_{137}	—	May 23, 2014	Haleakala	Pan-STARRS 1	·	780 m	MPC · JPL
819676	2014 KD_{139}	—	May 23, 2014	Haleakala	Pan-STARRS 1	·	2.0 km	MPC · JPL
819677	2014 KY_{140}	—	May 21, 2014	Haleakala	Pan-STARRS 1	HYG	1.9 km	MPC · JPL
819678	2014 KH_{141}	—	May 22, 2014	Haleakala	Pan-STARRS 1	CLA	1.0 km	MPC · JPL
819679	2014 KT_{141}	—	May 23, 2014	Haleakala	Pan-STARRS 1	·	2.0 km	MPC · JPL
819680	2014 KG_{142}	—	May 27, 2014	Mount Lemmon	Mount Lemmon Survey	·	2.4 km	MPC · JPL
819681	2014 KN_{142}	—	May 22, 2014	Mount Lemmon	Mount Lemmon Survey	·	670 m	MPC · JPL
819682	2014 KU_{144}	—	May 23, 2014	Haleakala	Pan-STARRS 1	·	1.8 km	MPC · JPL
819683	2014 KJ_{145}	—	May 7, 2014	Haleakala	Pan-STARRS 1	·	2.0 km	MPC · JPL
819684	2014 KJ_{146}	—	May 23, 2014	Haleakala	Pan-STARRS 1	V	460 m	MPC · JPL
819685	2014 KE_{156}	—	February 15, 2013	Haleakala	Pan-STARRS 1	·	1.4 km	MPC · JPL
819686	2014 KK_{156}	—	April 24, 2014	Haleakala	Pan-STARRS 1	·	750 m	MPC · JPL
819687	2014 KV_{158}	—	May 21, 2014	Haleakala	Pan-STARRS 1	THM	1.4 km	MPC · JPL
819688	2014 KQ_{165}	—	February 14, 2013	Haleakala	Pan-STARRS 1	·	2.2 km	MPC · JPL
819689	2014 LF	—	February 12, 2008	Kitt Peak	Spacewatch	H	370 m	MPC · JPL
819690	2014 LH_{1}	—	April 25, 2014	Mount Lemmon	Mount Lemmon Survey	·	1.4 km	MPC · JPL
819691	2014 LN_{1}	—	May 4, 2014	Haleakala	Pan-STARRS 1	·	2.2 km	MPC · JPL
819692	2014 LE_{2}	—	May 24, 2014	Haleakala	Pan-STARRS 1	·	750 m	MPC · JPL
819693	2014 LP_{4}	—	May 21, 2014	Mount Lemmon	Mount Lemmon Survey	NYS	670 m	MPC · JPL
819694	2014 LZ_{4}	—	September 23, 2011	Haleakala	Pan-STARRS 1	NYS	1.0 km	MPC · JPL
819695	2014 LN_{5}	—	September 28, 2011	Kitt Peak	Spacewatch	NYS	810 m	MPC · JPL
819696	2014 LO_{8}	—	May 7, 2014	Haleakala	Pan-STARRS 1	·	1.8 km	MPC · JPL
819697	2014 LH_{12}	—	October 28, 2011	Mount Lemmon	Mount Lemmon Survey	·	880 m	MPC · JPL
819698	2014 LT_{14}	—	October 5, 2012	Haleakala	Pan-STARRS 1	H	350 m	MPC · JPL
819699	2014 LR_{16}	—	June 4, 2014	Mount Lemmon	Mount Lemmon Survey	·	1.1 km	MPC · JPL
819700	2014 LB_{17}	—	May 7, 2014	Haleakala	Pan-STARRS 1	·	900 m	MPC · JPL

== 819701–819800 ==
back to top

Designation			Discovery			Properties		Ref
Permanent	Provisional	Named after	Date	Site	Discoverer(s)	Category	Diam.	Ref
819701	2014 LD_{18}	—	May 18, 2014	Mount Lemmon	Mount Lemmon Survey	·	1.3 km	MPC · JPL
819702	2014 LF_{19}	—	May 7, 2014	Haleakala	Pan-STARRS 1	V	480 m	MPC · JPL
819703	2014 LY_{20}	—	February 17, 2007	Mount Lemmon	Mount Lemmon Survey	·	2.3 km	MPC · JPL
819704	2014 LM_{22}	—	May 25, 2014	Haleakala	Pan-STARRS 1	·	2.0 km	MPC · JPL
819705	2014 LB_{26}	—	June 9, 2014	Mount Lemmon	Mount Lemmon Survey	H	420 m	MPC · JPL
819706	2014 LJ_{26}	—	February 7, 2011	Mount Lemmon	Mount Lemmon Survey	H	340 m	MPC · JPL
819707	2014 LV_{26}	—	August 25, 2012	Kitt Peak	Spacewatch	H	350 m	MPC · JPL
819708	2014 LG_{28}	—	June 8, 2014	Haleakala	Pan-STARRS 1	(5)	1.1 km	MPC · JPL
819709	2014 LT_{30}	—	May 7, 2014	Haleakala	Pan-STARRS 1	EOS	1.4 km	MPC · JPL
819710	2014 LH_{31}	—	May 11, 2005	Kitt Peak	Spacewatch	·	1.2 km	MPC · JPL
819711	2014 LO_{31}	—	June 3, 2014	Haleakala	Pan-STARRS 1	·	2.8 km	MPC · JPL
819712 Tezel	2014 LL_{32}	Tezel	June 6, 2014	Roque de los Muchachos	EURONEAR	·	2.2 km	MPC · JPL
819713	2014 LY_{32}	—	June 2, 2014	Haleakala	Pan-STARRS 1	·	820 m	MPC · JPL
819714	2014 LE_{33}	—	June 2, 2014	Haleakala	Pan-STARRS 1	·	1.2 km	MPC · JPL
819715	2014 LL_{34}	—	June 2, 2014	Mount Lemmon	Mount Lemmon Survey	·	770 m	MPC · JPL
819716	2014 LZ_{34}	—	November 17, 2015	Haleakala	Pan-STARRS 1	·	810 m	MPC · JPL
819717	2014 LA_{35}	—	June 4, 2014	Haleakala	Pan-STARRS 1	·	1.8 km	MPC · JPL
819718	2014 LK_{35}	—	June 4, 2014	Haleakala	Pan-STARRS 1	·	1.8 km	MPC · JPL
819719	2014 LX_{36}	—	June 5, 2014	Haleakala	Pan-STARRS 1	·	2.3 km	MPC · JPL
819720 Neculairădulescu	2014 LE_{37}	Neculairădulescu	June 9, 2014	Roque de los Muchachos	EURONEAR	·	970 m	MPC · JPL
819721	2014 LT_{37}	—	June 5, 2014	Haleakala	Pan-STARRS 1	·	950 m	MPC · JPL
819722	2014 LA_{38}	—	June 3, 2014	Haleakala	Pan-STARRS 1	·	2.6 km	MPC · JPL
819723	2014 LF_{38}	—	June 3, 2014	Haleakala	Pan-STARRS 1	·	2.5 km	MPC · JPL
819724	2014 LW_{38}	—	June 9, 2014	Mount Lemmon	Mount Lemmon Survey	EUN	960 m	MPC · JPL
819725	2014 LY_{42}	—	June 2, 2014	Haleakala	Pan-STARRS 1	·	1.5 km	MPC · JPL
819726	2014 LE_{43}	—	June 2, 2014	Haleakala	Pan-STARRS 1	·	2.0 km	MPC · JPL
819727	2014 MC	—	June 5, 2014	Haleakala	Pan-STARRS 1	H	380 m	MPC · JPL
819728	2014 MH	—	April 5, 2014	Haleakala	Pan-STARRS 1	·	880 m	MPC · JPL
819729	2014 MX_{2}	—	May 8, 2014	Haleakala	Pan-STARRS 1	·	2.2 km	MPC · JPL
819730	2014 MB_{4}	—	May 21, 2014	Mount Lemmon	Mount Lemmon Survey	·	2.2 km	MPC · JPL
819731	2014 MS_{4}	—	May 7, 2014	Haleakala	Pan-STARRS 1	·	2.1 km	MPC · JPL
819732	2014 MC_{8}	—	June 20, 2014	Haleakala	Pan-STARRS 1	·	2.8 km	MPC · JPL
819733	2014 MQ_{9}	—	April 28, 2014	Haleakala	Pan-STARRS 1	·	730 m	MPC · JPL
819734	2014 MF_{10}	—	June 21, 2014	Mount Lemmon	Mount Lemmon Survey	H	440 m	MPC · JPL
819735	2014 MH_{11}	—	June 2, 2014	Haleakala	Pan-STARRS 1	H	470 m	MPC · JPL
819736	2014 MQ_{11}	—	May 7, 2014	Haleakala	Pan-STARRS 1	·	2.5 km	MPC · JPL
819737	2014 MT_{11}	—	October 25, 2011	Haleakala	Pan-STARRS 1	·	720 m	MPC · JPL
819738	2014 MZ_{13}	—	April 3, 2008	Mount Lemmon	Mount Lemmon Survey	·	1.9 km	MPC · JPL
819739	2014 MC_{14}	—	May 26, 2014	Haleakala	Pan-STARRS 1	·	1.9 km	MPC · JPL
819740	2014 MQ_{14}	—	March 26, 2011	Haleakala	Pan-STARRS 1	H	380 m	MPC · JPL
819741	2014 MK_{15}	—	May 3, 2014	Kitt Peak	Spacewatch	·	2.1 km	MPC · JPL
819742	2014 MT_{16}	—	June 21, 2014	Mount Lemmon	Mount Lemmon Survey	·	540 m	MPC · JPL
819743	2014 MA_{19}	—	June 23, 2014	Mount Lemmon	Mount Lemmon Survey	EUP	3.4 km	MPC · JPL
819744	2014 MQ_{20}	—	June 2, 2014	Haleakala	Pan-STARRS 1	EUN	820 m	MPC · JPL
819745	2014 MP_{21}	—	November 8, 2010	Mount Lemmon	Mount Lemmon Survey	·	2.4 km	MPC · JPL
819746	2014 MO_{22}	—	January 27, 2012	Mount Lemmon	Mount Lemmon Survey	ADE	1.6 km	MPC · JPL
819747	2014 MP_{22}	—	June 23, 2014	Mount Lemmon	Mount Lemmon Survey	PHO	590 m	MPC · JPL
819748	2014 MU_{22}	—	July 24, 2003	Palomar	NEAT	·	930 m	MPC · JPL
819749	2014 MF_{27}	—	July 23, 2007	Costitx	OAM	·	650 m	MPC · JPL
819750	2014 MC_{28}	—	June 2, 2014	Haleakala	Pan-STARRS 1	H	420 m	MPC · JPL
819751	2014 MH_{29}	—	June 23, 2014	Mount Lemmon	Mount Lemmon Survey	·	1.6 km	MPC · JPL
819752	2014 MQ_{30}	—	June 23, 2014	Mount Lemmon	Mount Lemmon Survey	(5)	920 m	MPC · JPL
819753	2014 ME_{32}	—	June 24, 2014	Haleakala	Pan-STARRS 1	·	2.3 km	MPC · JPL
819754	2014 MM_{33}	—	June 25, 2014	Mount Lemmon	Mount Lemmon Survey	·	1.5 km	MPC · JPL
819755	2014 MU_{34}	—	November 19, 2007	Mount Lemmon	Mount Lemmon Survey	H	470 m	MPC · JPL
819756	2014 MS_{36}	—	September 27, 2003	Kitt Peak	Spacewatch	NYS	820 m	MPC · JPL
819757	2014 ML_{40}	—	June 10, 2007	Kitt Peak	Spacewatch	PHO	740 m	MPC · JPL
819758	2014 MR_{48}	—	June 29, 2014	Mount Lemmon	Mount Lemmon Survey	·	2.2 km	MPC · JPL
819759	2014 MU_{49}	—	August 27, 2009	Kitt Peak	Spacewatch	·	1.7 km	MPC · JPL
819760	2014 MC_{51}	—	December 31, 2011	Kitt Peak	Spacewatch	·	3.4 km	MPC · JPL
819761	2014 MW_{52}	—	September 23, 2011	Kitt Peak	Spacewatch	·	590 m	MPC · JPL
819762	2014 MK_{56}	—	June 27, 2014	Haleakala	Pan-STARRS 1	·	890 m	MPC · JPL
819763	2014 MB_{59}	—	June 30, 2014	Kitt Peak	Spacewatch	PHO	760 m	MPC · JPL
819764	2014 MU_{62}	—	June 28, 2014	Kitt Peak	Spacewatch	URS	2.3 km	MPC · JPL
819765	2014 MC_{64}	—	June 2, 2014	Mount Lemmon	Mount Lemmon Survey	·	430 m	MPC · JPL
819766	2014 MU_{66}	—	May 7, 2014	Haleakala	Pan-STARRS 1	·	2.4 km	MPC · JPL
819767	2014 MN_{71}	—	June 29, 2014	Haleakala	Pan-STARRS 1	·	1.0 km	MPC · JPL
819768	2014 MO_{73}	—	June 28, 2014	Haleakala	Pan-STARRS 1	·	2.2 km	MPC · JPL
819769	2014 MN_{74}	—	June 22, 2014	Haleakala	Pan-STARRS 1	·	910 m	MPC · JPL
819770	2014 MN_{75}	—	June 26, 2014	Haleakala	Pan-STARRS 1	EUP	3.0 km	MPC · JPL
819771	2014 MT_{75}	—	June 27, 2014	Haleakala	Pan-STARRS 1	·	2.1 km	MPC · JPL
819772	2014 MY_{78}	—	June 28, 2014	Kitt Peak	Spacewatch	·	470 m	MPC · JPL
819773	2014 MC_{79}	—	June 28, 2014	Haleakala	Pan-STARRS 1	·	830 m	MPC · JPL
819774	2014 MD_{82}	—	June 24, 2014	Haleakala	Pan-STARRS 1	·	2.1 km	MPC · JPL
819775	2014 MM_{82}	—	November 17, 2015	Haleakala	Pan-STARRS 1	EUN	1.0 km	MPC · JPL
819776	2014 MS_{82}	—	June 29, 2014	Haleakala	Pan-STARRS 1	·	1.8 km	MPC · JPL
819777	2014 MW_{84}	—	June 27, 2014	Haleakala	Pan-STARRS 1	·	830 m	MPC · JPL
819778	2014 MQ_{87}	—	June 24, 2014	Haleakala	Pan-STARRS 1	EOS	1.3 km	MPC · JPL
819779	2014 MX_{87}	—	June 22, 2014	Haleakala	Pan-STARRS 1	PHO	640 m	MPC · JPL
819780	2014 MO_{88}	—	June 28, 2014	Haleakala	Pan-STARRS 1	·	770 m	MPC · JPL
819781	2014 MV_{88}	—	June 19, 2014	Haleakala	Pan-STARRS 1	·	750 m	MPC · JPL
819782	2014 ME_{90}	—	June 19, 2014	Mount Lemmon	Mount Lemmon Survey	·	1.8 km	MPC · JPL
819783	2014 MF_{90}	—	June 27, 2014	Haleakala	Pan-STARRS 1	·	1.9 km	MPC · JPL
819784	2014 MY_{90}	—	June 27, 2014	Haleakala	Pan-STARRS 1	PHO	540 m	MPC · JPL
819785	2014 MM_{91}	—	June 30, 2014	Mount Lemmon	Mount Lemmon Survey	·	2.2 km	MPC · JPL
819786	2014 MA_{92}	—	June 27, 2014	Haleakala	Pan-STARRS 1	·	1.9 km	MPC · JPL
819787	2014 MM_{92}	—	June 30, 2014	Kitt Peak	Spacewatch	·	1.7 km	MPC · JPL
819788	2014 MW_{93}	—	June 29, 2014	Haleakala	Pan-STARRS 1	EUP	2.8 km	MPC · JPL
819789	2014 MJ_{95}	—	June 30, 2014	Haleakala	Pan-STARRS 1	H	470 m	MPC · JPL
819790	2014 MX_{96}	—	June 30, 2014	Haleakala	Pan-STARRS 1	·	1.1 km	MPC · JPL
819791	2014 MT_{101}	—	June 27, 2014	Haleakala	Pan-STARRS 1	·	1.2 km	MPC · JPL
819792	2014 NX	—	May 26, 2014	Haleakala	Pan-STARRS 1	·	1.1 km	MPC · JPL
819793	2014 NS_{1}	—	May 26, 2014	Haleakala	Pan-STARRS 1	·	1.0 km	MPC · JPL
819794	2014 NA_{2}	—	October 9, 2012	Mount Lemmon	Mount Lemmon Survey	H	340 m	MPC · JPL
819795	2014 NF_{3}	—	July 1, 2014	WISE	WISE	APO	310 m	MPC · JPL
819796	2014 NK_{3}	—	May 6, 2014	Haleakala	Pan-STARRS 1	·	1.0 km	MPC · JPL
819797	2014 NH_{5}	—	July 1, 2014	Haleakala	Pan-STARRS 1	EOS	1.4 km	MPC · JPL
819798	2014 NA_{7}	—	July 1, 2014	Haleakala	Pan-STARRS 1	·	1.6 km	MPC · JPL
819799	2014 NM_{8}	—	June 4, 2014	Haleakala	Pan-STARRS 1	·	2.0 km	MPC · JPL
819800	2014 NU_{11}	—	May 7, 2010	Mount Lemmon	Mount Lemmon Survey	MAS	610 m	MPC · JPL

== 819801–819900 ==
back to top

Designation			Discovery			Properties		Ref
Permanent	Provisional	Named after	Date	Site	Discoverer(s)	Category	Diam.	Ref
819801	2014 NJ_{16}	—	June 30, 2014	Kitt Peak	Spacewatch	H	430 m	MPC · JPL
819802	2014 NO_{17}	—	May 26, 2014	Haleakala	Pan-STARRS 1	·	760 m	MPC · JPL
819803	2014 NP_{17}	—	July 2, 2014	Haleakala	Pan-STARRS 1	·	910 m	MPC · JPL
819804	2014 NX_{19}	—	July 2, 2014	Mount Lemmon	Mount Lemmon Survey	·	2.4 km	MPC · JPL
819805	2014 NN_{20}	—	November 3, 2010	Mount Lemmon	Mount Lemmon Survey	·	1.6 km	MPC · JPL
819806	2014 NS_{20}	—	July 2, 2014	Haleakala	Pan-STARRS 1	T_{j} (2.99)	2.2 km	MPC · JPL
819807	2014 NX_{21}	—	May 31, 2014	Haleakala	Pan-STARRS 1	·	1.2 km	MPC · JPL
819808	2014 NK_{23}	—	July 2, 2014	Haleakala	Pan-STARRS 1	·	2.1 km	MPC · JPL
819809	2014 NW_{23}	—	March 16, 2013	Kitt Peak	Spacewatch	·	2.0 km	MPC · JPL
819810	2014 NA_{29}	—	July 2, 2014	Haleakala	Pan-STARRS 1	·	2.2 km	MPC · JPL
819811	2014 NZ_{29}	—	December 29, 2005	Mount Lemmon	Mount Lemmon Survey	·	2.6 km	MPC · JPL
819812	2014 NZ_{34}	—	July 2, 2014	Haleakala	Pan-STARRS 1	·	2.3 km	MPC · JPL
819813	2014 NV_{36}	—	July 2, 2014	Haleakala	Pan-STARRS 1	TIR	1.8 km	MPC · JPL
819814	2014 NY_{36}	—	December 25, 2005	Mount Lemmon	Mount Lemmon Survey	·	3.1 km	MPC · JPL
819815	2014 NC_{40}	—	July 3, 2014	Haleakala	Pan-STARRS 1	·	2.3 km	MPC · JPL
819816	2014 NJ_{43}	—	July 3, 2014	Haleakala	Pan-STARRS 1	PHO	760 m	MPC · JPL
819817	2014 NF_{46}	—	July 3, 2014	Haleakala	Pan-STARRS 1	·	2.3 km	MPC · JPL
819818	2014 NS_{47}	—	July 2, 2014	Haleakala	Pan-STARRS 1	·	1.1 km	MPC · JPL
819819	2014 NN_{49}	—	July 3, 2014	Haleakala	Pan-STARRS 1	·	2.9 km	MPC · JPL
819820	2014 NO_{52}	—	June 19, 2010	Mount Lemmon	Mount Lemmon Survey	RAF	710 m	MPC · JPL
819821	2014 NX_{62}	—	July 24, 2003	Palomar	NEAT	PHO	820 m	MPC · JPL
819822	2014 NJ_{65}	—	December 30, 2007	Kitt Peak	Spacewatch	·	590 m	MPC · JPL
819823	2014 NR_{70}	—	July 3, 2014	Haleakala	Pan-STARRS 1	·	1.4 km	MPC · JPL
819824	2014 NP_{71}	—	July 7, 2014	Haleakala	Pan-STARRS 1	PHO	740 m	MPC · JPL
819825	2014 NN_{73}	—	July 7, 2014	Haleakala	Pan-STARRS 1	NYS	920 m	MPC · JPL
819826	2014 NM_{74}	—	July 4, 2014	Haleakala	Pan-STARRS 1	·	2.2 km	MPC · JPL
819827	2014 NQ_{74}	—	July 3, 2014	Haleakala	Pan-STARRS 1	·	2.1 km	MPC · JPL
819828	2014 NS_{76}	—	November 18, 2015	Haleakala	Pan-STARRS 1	·	890 m	MPC · JPL
819829	2014 NL_{78}	—	January 16, 2018	Haleakala	Pan-STARRS 1	·	1.8 km	MPC · JPL
819830	2014 NC_{79}	—	July 26, 2015	Haleakala	Pan-STARRS 1	·	2.1 km	MPC · JPL
819831	2014 NP_{79}	—	July 2, 2014	Haleakala	Pan-STARRS 1	·	830 m	MPC · JPL
819832	2014 NV_{81}	—	July 2, 2014	Haleakala	Pan-STARRS 1	V	460 m	MPC · JPL
819833	2014 ND_{82}	—	July 8, 2014	Haleakala	Pan-STARRS 1	·	770 m	MPC · JPL
819834	2014 NW_{82}	—	July 4, 2014	Haleakala	Pan-STARRS 1	·	2.3 km	MPC · JPL
819835	2014 NH_{83}	—	July 2, 2014	Haleakala	Pan-STARRS 1	·	2.4 km	MPC · JPL
819836	2014 ND_{84}	—	July 1, 2014	Haleakala	Pan-STARRS 1	·	1.9 km	MPC · JPL
819837	2014 NE_{84}	—	July 3, 2014	Haleakala	Pan-STARRS 1	·	2.2 km	MPC · JPL
819838	2014 NA_{85}	—	July 1, 2014	Haleakala	Pan-STARRS 1	·	1.8 km	MPC · JPL
819839	2014 NE_{85}	—	July 10, 2014	Haleakala	Pan-STARRS 1	·	1.3 km	MPC · JPL
819840	2014 NJ_{85}	—	July 1, 2014	Haleakala	Pan-STARRS 1	·	2.4 km	MPC · JPL
819841	2014 NE_{86}	—	July 1, 2014	Haleakala	Pan-STARRS 1	H	460 m	MPC · JPL
819842	2014 NQ_{87}	—	July 10, 2014	Haleakala	Pan-STARRS 1	EUP	3.4 km	MPC · JPL
819843	2014 NF_{93}	—	July 1, 2014	Haleakala	Pan-STARRS 1	·	800 m	MPC · JPL
819844	2014 OJ_{1}	—	September 29, 2003	Anderson Mesa	LONEOS	NYS	840 m	MPC · JPL
819845	2014 OX_{1}	—	August 4, 2011	Haleakala	Pan-STARRS 1	·	960 m	MPC · JPL
819846	2014 OH_{2}	—	May 9, 2014	Haleakala	Pan-STARRS 1	·	2.4 km	MPC · JPL
819847	2014 OM_{2}	—	June 3, 2014	Haleakala	Pan-STARRS 1	·	2.9 km	MPC · JPL
819848	2014 OO_{8}	—	October 25, 2011	Haleakala	Pan-STARRS 1	·	870 m	MPC · JPL
819849	2014 OQ_{8}	—	January 27, 2012	Mount Lemmon	Mount Lemmon Survey	EOS	1.5 km	MPC · JPL
819850	2014 OZ_{11}	—	July 25, 2014	Haleakala	Pan-STARRS 1	·	1.0 km	MPC · JPL
819851	2014 OT_{15}	—	July 25, 2014	Haleakala	Pan-STARRS 1	·	1.2 km	MPC · JPL
819852	2014 OX_{17}	—	June 26, 2014	Haleakala	Pan-STARRS 1	·	2.8 km	MPC · JPL
819853	2014 OB_{18}	—	June 25, 2014	Mount Lemmon	Mount Lemmon Survey	·	1.1 km	MPC · JPL
819854	2014 OE_{22}	—	July 25, 2014	Haleakala	Pan-STARRS 1	HYG	1.9 km	MPC · JPL
819855	2014 OG_{25}	—	August 12, 2010	Kitt Peak	Spacewatch	·	980 m	MPC · JPL
819856	2014 OH_{26}	—	July 25, 2014	Haleakala	Pan-STARRS 1	·	550 m	MPC · JPL
819857	2014 OH_{29}	—	September 24, 2007	Kitt Peak	Spacewatch	CLA	1.1 km	MPC · JPL
819858	2014 OS_{29}	—	June 25, 2014	Mount Lemmon	Mount Lemmon Survey	·	2.1 km	MPC · JPL
819859	2014 OK_{32}	—	May 25, 2014	Haleakala	Pan-STARRS 1	·	2.2 km	MPC · JPL
819860	2014 OX_{32}	—	July 25, 2014	Haleakala	Pan-STARRS 1	·	860 m	MPC · JPL
819861	2014 OF_{37}	—	July 25, 2014	Haleakala	Pan-STARRS 1	·	830 m	MPC · JPL
819862	2014 OP_{39}	—	July 3, 2014	Haleakala	Pan-STARRS 1	THM	1.7 km	MPC · JPL
819863	2014 OY_{42}	—	June 27, 2014	Haleakala	Pan-STARRS 1	·	730 m	MPC · JPL
819864	2014 OX_{44}	—	July 25, 2014	Haleakala	Pan-STARRS 1	·	810 m	MPC · JPL
819865	2014 OZ_{44}	—	July 25, 2014	Haleakala	Pan-STARRS 1	·	760 m	MPC · JPL
819866	2014 OU_{50}	—	July 3, 2014	Haleakala	Pan-STARRS 1	·	880 m	MPC · JPL
819867	2014 OB_{52}	—	February 16, 2013	Mount Lemmon	Mount Lemmon Survey	·	880 m	MPC · JPL
819868	2014 OJ_{53}	—	July 18, 2003	Siding Spring	G. J. Garradd, R. H. McNaught	·	2.2 km	MPC · JPL
819869	2014 OG_{55}	—	January 26, 2012	Haleakala	Pan-STARRS 1	·	2.1 km	MPC · JPL
819870	2014 OG_{61}	—	July 25, 2014	Haleakala	Pan-STARRS 1	·	890 m	MPC · JPL
819871	2014 OS_{66}	—	July 25, 2014	Haleakala	Pan-STARRS 1	·	1.9 km	MPC · JPL
819872	2014 OY_{66}	—	June 27, 2014	Haleakala	Pan-STARRS 1	·	2.3 km	MPC · JPL
819873	2014 OG_{72}	—	September 30, 2003	Kitt Peak	Spacewatch	TIR	1.7 km	MPC · JPL
819874	2014 OM_{73}	—	April 21, 2014	Kitt Peak	Spacewatch	·	1.8 km	MPC · JPL
819875	2014 OM_{74}	—	July 26, 2014	Haleakala	Pan-STARRS 1	·	3.3 km	MPC · JPL
819876	2014 OX_{75}	—	June 27, 2014	Haleakala	Pan-STARRS 1	·	2.1 km	MPC · JPL
819877	2014 OM_{76}	—	June 27, 2014	Haleakala	Pan-STARRS 1	·	2.1 km	MPC · JPL
819878	2014 OL_{77}	—	June 30, 2014	Haleakala	Pan-STARRS 1	·	930 m	MPC · JPL
819879	2014 OT_{77}	—	July 7, 2014	Haleakala	Pan-STARRS 1	·	1.9 km	MPC · JPL
819880	2014 OH_{82}	—	May 7, 2006	Mount Lemmon	Mount Lemmon Survey	·	890 m	MPC · JPL
819881	2014 OE_{85}	—	June 30, 2014	Haleakala	Pan-STARRS 1	·	1.8 km	MPC · JPL
819882	2014 OA_{88}	—	June 29, 2014	Mount Lemmon	Mount Lemmon Survey	T_{j} (2.99) · EUP	2.2 km	MPC · JPL
819883	2014 OP_{90}	—	September 14, 2007	Mount Lemmon	Mount Lemmon Survey	·	720 m	MPC · JPL
819884	2014 OS_{90}	—	July 4, 2014	Haleakala	Pan-STARRS 1	·	920 m	MPC · JPL
819885	2014 OX_{92}	—	March 1, 2009	Mount Lemmon	Mount Lemmon Survey	·	1.3 km	MPC · JPL
819886	2014 OL_{95}	—	July 26, 2014	Haleakala	Pan-STARRS 1	·	2.7 km	MPC · JPL
819887	2014 OL_{96}	—	August 20, 2004	Kitt Peak	Spacewatch	·	460 m	MPC · JPL
819888	2014 OG_{97}	—	July 26, 2014	Haleakala	Pan-STARRS 1	·	1.3 km	MPC · JPL
819889	2014 OH_{97}	—	July 26, 2014	Haleakala	Pan-STARRS 1	·	1.7 km	MPC · JPL
819890	2014 OP_{97}	—	July 26, 2014	Haleakala	Pan-STARRS 1	·	1.8 km	MPC · JPL
819891	2014 OZ_{97}	—	August 22, 2003	Campo Imperatore	CINEOS	·	2.3 km	MPC · JPL
819892	2014 ON_{100}	—	June 24, 2014	Haleakala	Pan-STARRS 1	·	2.6 km	MPC · JPL
819893	2014 OJ_{103}	—	January 19, 2012	Haleakala	Pan-STARRS 1	·	2.4 km	MPC · JPL
819894	2014 OG_{105}	—	May 30, 2014	Haleakala	Pan-STARRS 1	PHO	820 m	MPC · JPL
819895	2014 ON_{106}	—	July 27, 2014	Haleakala	Pan-STARRS 1	·	540 m	MPC · JPL
819896	2014 OH_{108}	—	December 5, 2010	Mount Lemmon	Mount Lemmon Survey	EUP	2.5 km	MPC · JPL
819897	2014 OU_{110}	—	July 8, 2014	Haleakala	Pan-STARRS 1	·	2.5 km	MPC · JPL
819898	2014 OS_{112}	—	July 25, 2014	Haleakala	Pan-STARRS 1	EOS	1.5 km	MPC · JPL
819899	2014 OV_{112}	—	July 4, 2014	Haleakala	Pan-STARRS 1	·	2.2 km	MPC · JPL
819900	2014 OQ_{114}	—	July 25, 2014	Haleakala	Pan-STARRS 1	·	1.8 km	MPC · JPL

== 819901–820000 ==
back to top

Designation			Discovery			Properties		Ref
Permanent	Provisional	Named after	Date	Site	Discoverer(s)	Category	Diam.	Ref
819901	2014 OF_{115}	—	June 25, 2014	Mount Lemmon	Mount Lemmon Survey	·	2.2 km	MPC · JPL
819902	2014 OL_{118}	—	July 25, 2014	Haleakala	Pan-STARRS 1	THM	1.6 km	MPC · JPL
819903	2014 OA_{119}	—	July 25, 2014	Haleakala	Pan-STARRS 1	·	2.2 km	MPC · JPL
819904	2014 OV_{121}	—	July 25, 2014	Haleakala	Pan-STARRS 1	·	850 m	MPC · JPL
819905	2014 OR_{123}	—	September 22, 2003	Kitt Peak	Spacewatch	·	870 m	MPC · JPL
819906	2014 OK_{124}	—	December 2, 2011	ESA OGS	ESA OGS	·	820 m	MPC · JPL
819907	2014 OD_{127}	—	July 3, 2014	Haleakala	Pan-STARRS 1	·	1.9 km	MPC · JPL
819908	2014 OH_{129}	—	June 21, 2010	Mount Lemmon	Mount Lemmon Survey	·	720 m	MPC · JPL
819909	2014 OA_{130}	—	December 25, 2005	Kitt Peak	Spacewatch	ARM	2.4 km	MPC · JPL
819910	2014 OH_{130}	—	November 10, 2010	Mount Lemmon	Mount Lemmon Survey	·	1.7 km	MPC · JPL
819911	2014 OZ_{130}	—	May 7, 2014	Haleakala	Pan-STARRS 1	·	1.5 km	MPC · JPL
819912	2014 OL_{131}	—	May 10, 2014	Haleakala	Pan-STARRS 1	·	2.0 km	MPC · JPL
819913	2014 OK_{132}	—	September 10, 2010	Kitt Peak	Spacewatch	·	980 m	MPC · JPL
819914	2014 OU_{133}	—	July 27, 2014	Haleakala	Pan-STARRS 1	NYS	920 m	MPC · JPL
819915 Anacastañeda	2014 OQ_{134}	Anacastañeda	June 24, 2014	Roque de los Muchachos	EURONEAR	·	1.6 km	MPC · JPL
819916	2014 OR_{134}	—	July 25, 2014	Haleakala	Pan-STARRS 1	·	960 m	MPC · JPL
819917	2014 OM_{138}	—	June 28, 2014	Haleakala	Pan-STARRS 1	MAS	480 m	MPC · JPL
819918	2014 OO_{141}	—	October 15, 2004	Mount Lemmon	Mount Lemmon Survey	THM	1.6 km	MPC · JPL
819919	2014 OC_{143}	—	November 4, 2007	Mount Lemmon	Mount Lemmon Survey	·	780 m	MPC · JPL
819920	2014 OO_{143}	—	June 27, 2014	Haleakala	Pan-STARRS 1	·	840 m	MPC · JPL
819921	2014 OX_{147}	—	July 27, 2014	Haleakala	Pan-STARRS 1	·	2.0 km	MPC · JPL
819922	2014 OS_{150}	—	June 2, 2014	Haleakala	Pan-STARRS 1	·	2.4 km	MPC · JPL
819923	2014 OB_{154}	—	July 27, 2014	Haleakala	Pan-STARRS 1	·	2.1 km	MPC · JPL
819924	2014 OX_{156}	—	July 27, 2014	Haleakala	Pan-STARRS 1	·	940 m	MPC · JPL
819925	2014 OW_{159}	—	December 24, 2011	Mount Lemmon	Mount Lemmon Survey	PHO	720 m	MPC · JPL
819926	2014 OG_{165}	—	July 27, 2014	Haleakala	Pan-STARRS 1	·	1.9 km	MPC · JPL
819927	2014 OH_{170}	—	June 27, 2014	Haleakala	Pan-STARRS 1	V	410 m	MPC · JPL
819928	2014 OB_{173}	—	December 15, 2004	Socorro	LINEAR	·	2.0 km	MPC · JPL
819929	2014 OH_{173}	—	April 21, 2006	Kitt Peak	Spacewatch	·	770 m	MPC · JPL
819930	2014 OB_{177}	—	May 1, 2006	Mauna Kea	P. A. Wiegert	NYS	670 m	MPC · JPL
819931	2014 OC_{181}	—	July 8, 2014	Haleakala	Pan-STARRS 1	·	810 m	MPC · JPL
819932	2014 OM_{181}	—	June 28, 2014	Haleakala	Pan-STARRS 1	·	1.1 km	MPC · JPL
819933	2014 OA_{184}	—	November 30, 2011	Kitt Peak	Spacewatch	(1338) (FLO)	570 m	MPC · JPL
819934	2014 OC_{185}	—	September 21, 2009	Kitt Peak	Spacewatch	·	2.4 km	MPC · JPL
819935	2014 OD_{186}	—	July 27, 2014	Haleakala	Pan-STARRS 1	·	2.3 km	MPC · JPL
819936	2014 OE_{187}	—	January 2, 2012	Kitt Peak	Spacewatch	·	700 m	MPC · JPL
819937	2014 OQ_{193}	—	July 27, 2014	Haleakala	Pan-STARRS 1	·	930 m	MPC · JPL
819938	2014 OD_{197}	—	July 27, 2014	Haleakala	Pan-STARRS 1	NYS	940 m	MPC · JPL
819939	2014 OX_{215}	—	March 8, 2013	Haleakala	Pan-STARRS 1	·	1.2 km	MPC · JPL
819940	2014 OZ_{217}	—	July 27, 2014	Haleakala	Pan-STARRS 1	·	2.0 km	MPC · JPL
819941	2014 OB_{222}	—	July 27, 2014	Haleakala	Pan-STARRS 1	·	2.1 km	MPC · JPL
819942	2014 OM_{222}	—	June 29, 2014	Haleakala	Pan-STARRS 1	·	2.2 km	MPC · JPL
819943	2014 OA_{227}	—	July 8, 2014	Haleakala	Pan-STARRS 1	·	520 m	MPC · JPL
819944	2014 OK_{227}	—	June 28, 2014	Haleakala	Pan-STARRS 1	V	440 m	MPC · JPL
819945	2014 OD_{230}	—	September 17, 2003	Kitt Peak	Spacewatch	·	2.1 km	MPC · JPL
819946	2014 OZ_{230}	—	June 3, 2014	Haleakala	Pan-STARRS 1	TIR	2.0 km	MPC · JPL
819947	2014 OJ_{231}	—	July 27, 2014	Haleakala	Pan-STARRS 1	·	900 m	MPC · JPL
819948	2014 OM_{233}	—	September 18, 2007	Mount Lemmon	Mount Lemmon Survey	·	920 m	MPC · JPL
819949	2014 OT_{238}	—	September 10, 2007	Kitt Peak	Spacewatch	·	760 m	MPC · JPL
819950	2014 OT_{239}	—	April 6, 2005	Kitt Peak	Spacewatch	·	990 m	MPC · JPL
819951	2014 OV_{240}	—	July 29, 2014	Haleakala	Pan-STARRS 1	TIR	2.4 km	MPC · JPL
819952	2014 OJ_{249}	—	July 29, 2014	Haleakala	Pan-STARRS 1	V	440 m	MPC · JPL
819953	2014 OB_{251}	—	July 27, 2014	Haleakala	Pan-STARRS 1	·	1.9 km	MPC · JPL
819954	2014 OJ_{257}	—	July 29, 2014	Haleakala	Pan-STARRS 1	·	2.0 km	MPC · JPL
819955	2014 OM_{266}	—	June 27, 2014	Haleakala	Pan-STARRS 1	·	540 m	MPC · JPL
819956	2014 OR_{267}	—	July 8, 2014	Haleakala	Pan-STARRS 1	·	2.4 km	MPC · JPL
819957	2014 OA_{272}	—	June 29, 2014	Haleakala	Pan-STARRS 1	·	780 m	MPC · JPL
819958	2014 OO_{274}	—	July 29, 2014	Haleakala	Pan-STARRS 1	·	820 m	MPC · JPL
819959	2014 OF_{277}	—	July 29, 2014	Haleakala	Pan-STARRS 1	NYS	820 m	MPC · JPL
819960	2014 OH_{280}	—	November 10, 2010	Mount Lemmon	Mount Lemmon Survey	AGN	810 m	MPC · JPL
819961	2014 OA_{281}	—	July 25, 2014	Haleakala	Pan-STARRS 1	·	2.3 km	MPC · JPL
819962	2014 ON_{281}	—	July 8, 2014	Haleakala	Pan-STARRS 1	·	820 m	MPC · JPL
819963	2014 OP_{287}	—	July 27, 2014	Haleakala	Pan-STARRS 1	T_{j} (2.92)	2.3 km	MPC · JPL
819964	2014 OZ_{288}	—	June 28, 2014	Haleakala	Pan-STARRS 1	·	1.7 km	MPC · JPL
819965	2014 OF_{292}	—	July 25, 2014	Haleakala	Pan-STARRS 1	·	2.3 km	MPC · JPL
819966	2014 OS_{292}	—	July 29, 2014	Haleakala	Pan-STARRS 1	·	2.4 km	MPC · JPL
819967	2014 OR_{297}	—	October 24, 2009	Kitt Peak	Spacewatch	·	1.7 km	MPC · JPL
819968	2014 OB_{299}	—	July 29, 2014	Haleakala	Pan-STARRS 1	·	760 m	MPC · JPL
819969	2014 OL_{299}	—	September 29, 2005	Mount Lemmon	Mount Lemmon Survey	·	1.2 km	MPC · JPL
819970	2014 OA_{303}	—	March 18, 2013	Mount Lemmon	Mount Lemmon Survey	·	1.5 km	MPC · JPL
819971	2014 OP_{305}	—	December 24, 2005	Kitt Peak	Spacewatch	EOS	1.6 km	MPC · JPL
819972	2014 OF_{307}	—	August 8, 2002	Palomar	NEAT	·	2.1 km	MPC · JPL
819973	2014 OY_{310}	—	September 23, 2009	Mount Lemmon	Mount Lemmon Survey	THM	1.7 km	MPC · JPL
819974	2014 OD_{311}	—	June 27, 2014	Haleakala	Pan-STARRS 1	·	1.1 km	MPC · JPL
819975	2014 OD_{317}	—	July 26, 2014	Haleakala	Pan-STARRS 1	H	360 m	MPC · JPL
819976	2014 OY_{321}	—	June 25, 2014	Mount Lemmon	Mount Lemmon Survey	·	840 m	MPC · JPL
819977	2014 OV_{329}	—	June 27, 2014	Haleakala	Pan-STARRS 1	·	860 m	MPC · JPL
819978	2014 OS_{330}	—	July 25, 2014	Haleakala	Pan-STARRS 1	·	920 m	MPC · JPL
819979	2014 OB_{332}	—	July 3, 2014	Haleakala	Pan-STARRS 1	·	1.6 km	MPC · JPL
819980	2014 OU_{341}	—	May 8, 2006	Mount Lemmon	Mount Lemmon Survey	·	830 m	MPC · JPL
819981	2014 OE_{342}	—	February 28, 2009	Mount Lemmon	Mount Lemmon Survey	·	1.2 km	MPC · JPL
819982	2014 OF_{342}	—	February 5, 2013	Mount Lemmon	Mount Lemmon Survey	T_{j} (2.98)	1.6 km	MPC · JPL
819983	2014 OU_{342}	—	July 25, 2014	Haleakala	Pan-STARRS 1	·	740 m	MPC · JPL
819984	2014 OO_{343}	—	November 4, 2007	Mount Lemmon	Mount Lemmon Survey	·	1.1 km	MPC · JPL
819985	2014 OW_{349}	—	July 28, 2014	Haleakala	Pan-STARRS 1	·	870 m	MPC · JPL
819986	2014 OP_{372}	—	January 9, 2013	Kitt Peak	Spacewatch	H	410 m	MPC · JPL
819987	2014 OA_{374}	—	July 25, 2014	Haleakala	Pan-STARRS 1	MAS	570 m	MPC · JPL
819988	2014 OH_{374}	—	July 25, 2014	Haleakala	Pan-STARRS 1	·	2.1 km	MPC · JPL
819989	2014 OX_{376}	—	June 29, 2014	Haleakala	Pan-STARRS 1	·	2.1 km	MPC · JPL
819990	2014 OB_{377}	—	July 6, 2014	Haleakala	Pan-STARRS 1	LIX	2.9 km	MPC · JPL
819991	2014 OD_{379}	—	July 6, 2014	Haleakala	Pan-STARRS 1	NYS	840 m	MPC · JPL
819992	2014 OQ_{379}	—	June 30, 2014	Haleakala	Pan-STARRS 1	·	930 m	MPC · JPL
819993	2014 OC_{380}	—	June 2, 2014	Haleakala	Pan-STARRS 1	·	810 m	MPC · JPL
819994	2014 OW_{380}	—	August 1, 1998	Caussols	ODAS	·	2.0 km	MPC · JPL
819995	2014 OS_{381}	—	April 8, 2014	Haleakala	Pan-STARRS 1	·	2.0 km	MPC · JPL
819996	2014 OX_{381}	—	January 23, 2011	Mount Lemmon	Mount Lemmon Survey	·	1.9 km	MPC · JPL
819997	2014 OE_{382}	—	September 15, 2009	Kitt Peak	Spacewatch	·	2.3 km	MPC · JPL
819998	2014 OO_{382}	—	July 27, 2014	Haleakala	Pan-STARRS 1	·	1.9 km	MPC · JPL
819999	2014 OC_{393}	—	July 28, 2003	Palomar	NEAT	TIR	2.4 km	MPC · JPL
820000	2014 OZ_{397}	—	July 30, 2014	Kitt Peak	Spacewatch	·	1.3 km	MPC · JPL

back to top

== Meaning of names ==
As minor planet discoveries are confirmed, they are given a permanent number by the IAU's Minor Planet Center (MPC), and the discoverers can then submit names for them, following the IAU's naming conventions. The list below concerns those minor planets in the specified number-range that have received names, and explains the meanings of those names.

Official naming citations of newly named small Solar System bodies are approved and published in a bulletin by IAU's Working Group for Small Bodies Nomenclature (WGSBN). Before May 2021, citations were published in MPC's Minor Planet Circulars for many decades. Recent citations can also be found on the JPL Small-Body Database (SBDB). Until his death in 2016, German astronomer Lutz D. Schmadel compiled these citations into the Dictionary of Minor Planet Names (DMP) and regularly updated the collection.

Based on Paul Herget's The Names of the Minor Planets, Schmadel also researched the unclear origin of numerous asteroids, most of which had been named prior to World War II. This article incorporates text from this source, which is in the public domain: SBDB New namings may only be added to this list below after official publication as the preannouncement of names is condemned. The WGSBN publishes a comprehensive guideline for the naming rules of non-cometary small Solar System bodies.

Named minor planet	Provisional	This minor planet was named for...	Ref · Catalog
819712 Tezel	2014 LL_{32}	Named after Tunç Tezel.	IAU · 819712
819720 Neculairădulescu	2014 LE_{37}	Neculai Rădulescu, Romanian astronomer and mathematician who graduated from the University of Bucharest.	IAU · 819720
819915 Anacastañeda	2014 OQ_{134}	Ana Castañeda Pérez, Spanish leader of the tourism branch of the Cabildo de La Palma.	IAU · 819915
