= The Polish Officer =

1995 novel by Alan Furst

- First edition
- Author: Alan Furst
- Language: English
- Genre: War novel Historical novel Spy novel
- Publisher: Random House
- Publication date: 1995
- Publication place: United States
- Media type: Print (Paperback)
- ISBN: 067941312X
- OCLC: 30031090
- Followed by: The World at Night

The Polish Officer is a 1995 novel by Alan Furst published by Random House.

== Plot summary ==
In September 1939, as Warsaw falls to the Wehrmacht, Captain Alexander de Milja is recruited to Poland's newly formed underground army, the Związek Walki Zbrojnej (ZWZ), or the Union of Armed Struggle. His first mission is to smuggle the national gold reserves out of the country by means of a refugee train to Bucharest. Under a series of aliases, De Milja undertakes various missions to sabotage German operations. These see him collude with fellow saboteurs in the back alleys and black-market bistros of Paris, working with the underground in the tenements of Warsaw, assisting the British attack on German naval targets in the harbor of Calais, and teaming with partisan guerrillas in the frozen forests of Ukraine. His exploits see him assume various aliases; he passes at any one time as a Russian writer, a Slovak coal merchant, or a Polish horse breeder.
