= Tunç Tezel =

Turkish astronomer (born 1977)

Tunç Tezel (born in 1977 in Bursa, Turkey) is a Turkish amateur astronomer, photographer and civil engineer. He is a member of The World at Night (TWAN), an international program in which photographers from around the world capture images of night skies as seen above notable landmarks of the planet. He has been a member of the Turkish Astronomical Society (Türk Astronomi Derneği, TAD) since 2007.

Tezel is an avid eclipse chaser. In 2006 he completed the first ever Analemma photograph that included a total Solar eclipse, which is called Tutulemma, after the Turkish word for eclipse: tutulma. This unique feat brought worldwide acclaim and publication of his photographs. Tezel's other specialty in night sky photography is capturing rare conjunctions and occultations of bright stars, planets and bright clusters near the Moon. He also creates dramatic all-sky and time-lapse photographs that capture meteors and the motions of the cosmos. Photographing retrograde motions of planets has been one of his trademarks. His images have also been used in motion pictures.

In 2011, he won the annual Astrophotographer of the Year contest held by Royal Museums Greenwich in Earth and Space category with the picture titled Galactic Paradise. He was amongst winners of Astrophotographer of the Year contest twice more, with the picture "Sky Away From The Lights" awarded as Highly Commended in Earth and Space category in 2012 and "Diamonds and Rubies" Highly Commended in Our Solar System category in 2014.

Asteroid 819712 Tezel (2014 LL_{32}) is named after him. The citation says: "Well-known for pictures of skyscapes and long-term motions of planets including retrograde motions and analemmas, he is also the creator of Tutulemma, an analemma photograph that includes a solar eclipse."
