= Alan Furst =

American historical spy novelist (born 1941)

- Born: February 20, 1941 (age 85); New York City, U.S.
- Education: Oberlin College (BA); Pennsylvania State University (MA)
- Occupation: Author
- Writing career
- Notable work: The Night Soldiers novels
- Notable awards: Helmerich Award
- Website: alanfurst.net

Alan Furst (/fɜːrst/; born 1941) is an American author of historical spy novels. Furst has been called "an heir to the tradition of Eric Ambler and Graham Greene," whom he cites along with Joseph Roth and Arthur Koestler as important influences. Most of his novels since 1988 have been set just prior to or during the Second World War and he is noted for his successful evocations of Eastern European peoples and places during the period from 1933 to 1944.

== Biography ==
Furst was born in New York City, and raised on the Upper West Side of Manhattan. His family has ancestors in Poland, Latvia, and Russia. His great-grandfather was drafted into the Russian army, and, as a Jew, was required to serve 20 years.

He attended the Horace Mann School, received a B.A. from Oberlin College in 1962, and an M.A. from Penn State in 1967.

While attending general studies courses at Columbia University, he became acquainted with Margaret Mead, for whom he later worked. Before becoming a full-time novelist, Furst worked in advertising and wrote magazine articles, most notably for Esquire, and as a columnist for the International Herald Tribune.

== Early writings ==
Furst's papers were obtained by the Harry Ransom Center at The University of Texas at Austin. They include a 1963 letter from his grandfather, Max Stockman, which urged Furst to become a teacher and 'write as a sideline' in his spare time. The collection also includes early articles on a wide variety of topics, published in many magazines for which no common denominator can be found, including Architectural Digest, Elle, Esquire, 50 Plus, International Herald Tribune, Islands, New Choices, New York, The New York Times, Pursuits, Salon, and Seattle Weekly.

The Ransom collection remarks: "Of note is the April 1984 Esquire article, 'The Danube Blues,' which sparked Furst's interest in writing espionage novels. Numerous slides of his 1983 Danube trip are also available. Unproduced screenplays include 'Heroes of the Last War' (1984), and 'Warsaw' (1992)."

His early novels (1976–1983) achieved limited success. One item, held in the Ransom collection, includes the manuscript for "One Smart Cookie" (with Debbi Fields, 1987), a commissioned biography of the owner of the Mrs. Fields Cookies company.

The year 1988 saw publication of Night Soldiers—inspired by his 1984 trip to Eastern Europe on assignment for Esquire—which invigorated his career and led to a succession of related titles. His output since 1988 includes a dozen works. He is especially noted for his successful evocations of Eastern European peoples and places during the period from 1933 to 1944. While all his historical espionage novels are loosely connected (protagonists in one book might appear as minor characters in another), only The World at Night and Red Gold share a common plot.

Writing in The New York Times, the novelist Justin Cartwright says that Furst, who lives in Sag Harbor, Long Island, "has adopted a European sensibility." Awarded a Fulbright teaching fellowship in 1969, Furst moved to Sommières, France, outside of Montpellier, and taught at the University of Montpellier. He later lived for many years in Paris, a city that he calls "the heart of civilisation" which figures significantly in all his novels.

In 2011, the Tulsa Library Trust in Tulsa, Oklahoma selected Furst to receive its Helmerich Award, a literary prize given annually to honor a distinguished author's body of work.

In 2012, he appeared in a documentary about the life and work of author W. Somerset Maugham, Revealing Mr. Maugham.

== Works ==
=== Stand-alone novel ===
- Shadow Trade (1983)

=== Roger Levin ===
1. Your Day in the Barrel (1976)
2. The Paris Drop (1980)
3. The Caribbean Account (1981)

=== Night Soldiers novels ===
1. Night Soldiers (1988)
2. Dark Star (1991)
3. The Polish Officer (1995)
4. The World at Night (1996)
5. Red Gold (1999)
6. Kingdom of Shadows (2000)
7. Blood of Victory (2003)
8. Dark Voyage (2004)
9. The Foreign Correspondent (2006)
10. The Spies of Warsaw (2008)
11. Spies of the Balkans (2010)
12. Mission to Paris (2012)
13. Midnight in Europe (2014)
14. A Hero of France (2016)
15. Under Occupation (2019)
