= Kingdom of Shadows =

2000 novel by Alan Furst

- First UK edition
- Author: Alan Furst
- Language: English
- Genre: War novel/Historical novel/Spy novel
- Publisher: Random House
- Publication date: 2000
- Publication place: United States
- Media type: Print (Paperback)
- ISBN: 0-375-75826-7
- OCLC: 47643541

Kingdom of Shadows (2000) is a novel by Alan Furst. Critics gave positive reviews to the novel. It won the 2001 Hammett Prize.

== Plot summary ==
The story is set in Europe between April 1938 and July 1939, a time of ever-increasing fear and apprehension throughout the continent. Nicholas Morath is an expatriate Hungarian in his forties and the co-owner of an advertising agency in Paris. His uncle, Count Janos Polanyi, is a high-level functionary at the Hungarian embassy in France. Morath is in fact an amateur spy, sent on one dangerous mission after another at his uncle's behest (laundering money through the Antwerp diamond industry, or spending a week in a Romanian jail, for example). Polanyi tells his nephew little about the reasons for or the results of these excursions, and friction often rises between the two men. But after Polanyi disappears mysteriously, Morath continues his perilous work alone.
