= Midnight in Europe =

- First edition
- Author: Alan Furst
- Language: English
- Genre: War, historical
- Publisher: Weidenfeld and Nicolson
- Publication date: 2014
- Publication place: United States
- Media type: Print (paperback)
- ISBN: 9781400069491
- OCLC: 907398997
- LC Class: PS3556.U76 M53 2014

Midnight in Europe is the thirteenth novel in Alan Furst's Night Soldiers series of espionage thrillers. It was published in 2014 by Weidenfeld and Nicolson in the UK and in the US by Random House.

== Plot ==
The novel is set between December 1937 and September 1938 and features the lawyer Cristián Ferrar, who works for a firm based in Paris but with a New York partner. Of Catalan origin, his family moved to France in 1909 but did not seek naturalization. Now, supporting the Republican side in the Spanish Civil War, Ferrar agrees to help procure arms for the Government side in the face of the non-interventionist policy of the democratic nations and links up with Max de Lyon of the Spanish Embassy's Oficina Técnica.

Their first mission is to obtain anti-tank guns from the Škoda Works in the Czechoslovak Republic, which involves an initial trip to Nazi Germany, posing as representatives of a nudist magazine, and then an adventure in the Second Polish Republic, where both the German and Francoist secret services are active. An attempt there to redirect the train carrying the guns away from the Port of Gdansk is only foiled at the last minute.

After his return to Paris, Ferrar becomes involved with a French-born marchioness who has already lured one Spanish émigré to his death, in the end managing to disengage her from her Nationalist handlers. His next task is to purchase anti-aircraft shells from the naval arsenal at Odessa, which involves recruiting local criminals to impersonate the Russian secret police. Ferrar and de Lyon join the ship in Constanța, but it is tracked along the way and attacked by an armed Italian naval launch off Sicily, only escaping by shooting out its searchlight at the height of a storm. Ultimately, however, the strategy for which the ammunition is procured proves a failure.

The novel ends where it began in New York, with Ferrar making contact with an old flame.

== Response ==
For Charles Finch, writing in The New York Times, Midnight in Europe is "not quite as good" as its predecessor and "suffers from a slight lack of tension". For Carrie Callaghan in the Washington Independent Review of Books, "Ferrar's adventures feel episodic", while for Mary Burns of the Historical Novel Society the hero is "two-dimensional" and some of the other characters the predictable stock in trade of this kind of novel.

Others, however, assert that one reads Furst's fiction more for the atmosphere than the plot. Kirkus Reviews notes that the author "portrays Europe with masterful foreboding, a mood that paints the continent in shades of gray." Many also appreciate the telling details, such as the remark that the Macedonian Stavros grew up "fighting Bulgarian bandits. After that, being a gangster was easy" - or that the prostitutes of Madrid had to leave their hair unbleached because all the city's peroxide was in use as antiseptic for the wounded.
