= The World at Night =

1996 novel by Alan Furst

- First edition
- Author: Alan Furst
- Language: English
- Genre: War, historical, spy
- Publisher: Random House
- Publication date: 1996
- Publication place: United States
- Media type: Print (paperback)
- ISBN: 0-375-75858-5
- OCLC: 48045604
- Dewey Decimal: 813/.54 21
- LC Class: PS3556.U76 W67 2002
- Followed by: Red Gold

The World at Night (1996) is a novel by Alan Furst.

== Plot summary ==
The story takes place in and around Paris between May 1940 and June 1941. Jean Casson is a French motion-picture producer who specializes in gangster films and who possesses no political views to speak of. When the Germans defeat and conquer his country, Casson at first tries to continue his life and career as if nothing had happened. But that proves impossible; when the Germans arrest a few of his friends and associates Casson finds himself helping others to hide or escape. He is seen talking to questionable people, and before long his line is tapped and his movements followed. Eventually Casson must choose between a life of resistance or no life at all.

== Critical reception ==
Kirkus Reviews wrote: “At times, the author seems more concerned with atmosphere than action, but fans will recognize his gift for making every gesture an expression of character and allow him to get away with it. The payoff is worth the wait. Furst has somehow discovered the perfect venue for uniting the European literary tragedy with the Anglo-American spy thriller. Nobody does it better.”
