= Reverse onus =

Type of legal provision

A reverse onus clause is a provision within a statute that shifts the burden of proof onto the individual specified to disprove an element of the information. Typically, this particular provision concerns a shift in burden onto a defendant in either a criminal offence or tort claim. For example, the automotive legislation in many countries provides that any driver who hits a pedestrian has the burden of establishing that they were not negligent.

== Canada ==
Reverse onus clauses can be seen in the Criminal Code, where the accused must disprove an imposed presumption. These sorts of provisions are contentious as they almost always violate the presumption of innocence protected under section 11(d) of the Canadian Charter of Rights and Freedoms. The only way that such a provision can survive Charter scrutiny is if it can be justified under section 1.

The Supreme Court of Canada has struck down a number of reverse onus provisions. The first and most famous of them was the striking down of section 8 of the Narcotics Control Act in the decision of R v Oakes. The Supreme Court in the decision of R v Laba (1994) struck down section 394(1) of the Criminal Code that required a person who sold or purchased rocks containing precious metals to prove that they did so lawfully.

In reaction to the number of shootings in Toronto and as part of his 2006 election campaign, Paul Martin proposed amending s. 515(1) of the Criminal Code so that there would be a reverse onus in bail proceedings for those accused with gun-related crimes.

To successfully prosecute hit and run cases, the prosecution must prove, beyond a reasonable doubt, that the hit and run occurred. Yet there is a presumption that the person on trial, for a hit-and-run, fled the scene of a crash to avoid civil or criminal liability, if the remaining essential elements of the case can be proven beyond a reasonable doubt.

== United Kingdom ==
The Criminal Finances Act 2017 enables a British court to issue an unexplained wealth order to compel someone to reveal the sources of their unexplained wealth. Individuals who fail to account can have their assets seized by the National Crime Agency. The law achieves its objectives of fighting money laundering by reversing the onus onto the suspect.

English libel law is another example. Generally the claimant is required to prove that a statement was made by the defendant, and that it was defamatory – a relatively easy element to prove. The claimant is not required to prove that the content of the statement was false. The onus then shifts to the defendant to prove the truth of the statement which would be considered an affirmative defence. This contrasts with US defamation law, in which rather than truth being a defence, falsity is an element of the tort, so it is for the plaintiff to prove.

In relation to allegedly faulty goods, the reversed burden of proof ensures that during the first six months after a sale, a consumer need not produce any evidence that a product was inherently faulty at the time it was purchased: the retailer must either accept that there was an inherent fault, and offer a remedy, or dispute that it was inherently flawed. After six months the burden of proof is once again on the consumer.

== Pakistan ==
In Pakistan, the National Accountability Ordinance, 1999 places the burden of proof on the accused in cases where the wealth of the accused is above and beyond his or her known sources of income. Once the National Accountability Bureau, the federal agency responsible for prosecuting corruption and corrupt practices, establishes that an accused has amassed wealth above and beyond his or her known sources of income, the onus shifts to the accused to establish that his or her wealth has been gathered by legitimate means. The trial under this law takes place in special Accountability Courts established under the National Accountability Ordinance, 1999.

== Jurisprudence ==
The concept of reverse onus is a shift in burden of proof with the presupposition that the applicant (usually prosecution) will be granted their application by the courts. The onus is on the respondent to make a reasonable application of the rule of law with which the application is incompatible.

== See also ==
- Affirmative defense
- Presumption of innocence
