= Khala v Minister of Safety and Security =

1994 South African court case

Khala v Minister of Safety and Security is an important case in South African law.

== Facts ==
The plaintiff had instituted action against the defendant for damages arising from an alleged unlawful arrest and detention. The defendant considered that the police docket relating to such arrest was privileged, and listed it accordingly in his discovery affidavit. The plaintiff then launched the application in casu for an order directing the defendant to make the police docket available for inspection and copying.

== Judgment ==
=== Amicus curiae ===
After the postponement of the matter, from May 19, 1994, to June 13, 1994, the court (with the consent of the parties, and having obtained the approval of the Judge President) appointed Prof E. Mureinik of the Law Faculty of the University of the Witwatersrand to act as amicus curiae. Prof Mureinik filed heads of argument, provided copies of authorities, and made oral submissions after those of the plaintiff and defendant had been concluded. Counsel for the plaintiff and defendant thereafter replied to his submissions. He was not remunerated for this work. His assistance was "invaluable to the Court and was greatly appreciated."

=== Merits ===
Having set out the provisions of the Constitution relevant to the issue, the court considered the principles applicable in interpreting provisions of a constitution. Fundamental-rights provisions call for a generous and purposive interpretation. The meaning of a right is to be gathered from a consideration of the interests it was intended to protect. The principles of interpretation contained in section 35 of the Constitution are also applicable.

The court then turned to an examination of Plaintiff's rights under section 23. It was accepted that the information contained in the police docket was held by an organ of state, and was information relevant to the protection of the plaintiff's rights to freedom and security. The defendant, however, placed in issue that the information was “required” by the plaintiff. After a survey of judicial interpretations of the word “required,” the Court concluded that, in its context in section 23, whether information is “required” in any particular case is a factual question. This raised the issue of whether it was intended that section 23 should serve as a discovery measure in litigation between the government and another.

The defendant contended that it was not, and that section 23 should be viewed as analogous to the freedom-of-information statutes enacted in various other countries. The court held that such an analogy is not proper. Section 23 does not give the public a general right of access to information. It confers on individuals a right of access to information which is required for the exercise or protection of a right. Then and only then does the State have an obligation to provide access.

To resist a claim for information, the State would have to satisfy the requirements of section 33 in each particular case. The Court concluded that it was appropriate to use section 23 to obtain discovery of documents, and that the plaintiff was entitled in terms of section 23 to the information in the police docket. The court then turned to a consideration of the defendant's reliance on section 33(1). This resolved into a question of whether docket privilege is reasonable and justifiable in an open and democratic society based on freedom and equality. (In regard to the requirement of section 33(1)(b)—that a limit “shall not negate the essential content of a right”—the court found that docket privilege did not negate the essential content of the section 23 right.) The court held that Defendant bore the onus to establish this according to the civil standard of proof.

Before turning to a consideration of the affidavit of the Commissioner of Police in support of the defendant's contentions, the Court set out the nature of docket privilege. Prior to 1954, only three categories of privilege were recognised:

1. State secrets;
2. identity of informers in criminal cases; and
3. professional privilege.

R v Steyn conferred a privilege on police dockets. In creating this general privilege, appeal was made to considerations of public policy. Thereafter, judicial precedent extended the privilege and added to it the principle, taken from legal professional privilege, of “once privileged, always privileged.”

In his affidavit, the Commissioner of Police advanced reasons justifying the withholding of information contained in the police docket in a criminal case. These included

- the prejudice to the investigation of crime if the identity of informers or the techniques of investigation were revealed;
- the possible reluctance of foreign police forces to share information in the absence of a guarantee of confidentiality; and
- the adverse effect on the flow of information from the public if its members could not be assured of confidentiality.

In assessing the cogency of such a justification, the court considered that a starting point must be an acceptance that the administration of justice and the maintenance of social peace and order is a fundamental public interest. This dictated that, as a matter of public policy, some information (such as the identity of informers) should be subject to privilege and not be disclosed.

The defendant's case, however, was that, because some of the information might be privileged, all the information should be withheld. This approach did not deal with whether the non-disclosure of unprivileged information in the docket was justifiable in an open and democratic society based on freedom and equality. To determine this question, the parties had been requested to inform the court of the practice in other countries.

By agreement the parties, jointly requested Professor T Geldenhuys of the University of South Africa to prepare a memorandum setting out research conducted by him on this question. Such research covered discovery practice in criminal cases in Canada, New Zealand, the United States of America, England and Australia. The findings are set out in the court's judgment.

The Court concluded from that survey that, in general, the trend in those societies was towards an expansion of the accused's rights of access to information in the possession of the prosecution. In the court's view, South African law should fall in line with that international trend. Policy considerations in favour of disclosure of unprivileged information outweigh those against disclosure. Any residual doubt on where the balance lay was removed by taking into account the fundamental right of equality before the law (section 8(1)), the right to a fair trial (section 25(3)) and the presumption of innocence (section 25(3)(c)).

The Court concluded that Defendant had not established that the privilege hitherto attaching to the police docket in respect of its unprivileged contents was reasonable and justifiable in an open and democratic society based on freedom and equality. The Court rejected the claim of docket privilege and granted the defendant leave to file a supplementary discovery affidavit disclosing, in the first schedule, the information in respect of which no privilege was claimed and in the second schedule, that information in respect of which privilege was claimed.

== See also ==
- South African constitutional law
- South African criminal procedure
