= Murder of Agnès Marin =

2011 child murder in Haute-Loire, France

On 16 November 2011, Agnès Marin (26 November 1997 – 16 November 2011), a 13-year-old girl, was raped and murdered in Le Chambon-sur-Lignon, Haute-Loire, France. The murder was committed by 17-year-old Matthieu Moulinas, a student at the same school who at the time was on parole while awaiting trial for rape of another girl.

== Early life ==
Agnès Marin (Note: Under French law, juvenile victims' names are not to be made public, but hers was released by her family.) was a boarder in year four (Note: The equivalent of the eighth grade in the U.S.) at the Collège Cévenol, a private school in which her parents, Frédéric and Paola Marin, had enrolled her that year because of bad influences at her previous school in Paris. According to a close friend, she was a good student who was interested in becoming a filmmaker.

== Murder ==
On Wednesday 16 November 2011, Marin, then 13, accompanied a fellow student, Mathieu Moulinas, then 17, (Note: Although French law forbids revealing information that might identify a minor offender, his last name was leaked to the press.) into woods to look for hallucinogenic mushrooms. Moulinas raped her and stabbed her and then burnt her body.

Her body was found two days later; she was buried in Paris on what would have been her 14th birthday, 26 November 2011.

== Perpetrator ==
Mathieu Moulinas, who turned 18 the month after the murder, was from Nages-et-Solorgues, in Gard; his parents, Sophie and Dominique Moulinas, have two younger daughters.

On 2 August 2010, Moulinas lured a 15-year-old acquaintance into a forest on the pretense of giving her €10 he owed her. There he tied her to a tree and raped her; she believed she would have been killed if her mother had not called her on her mobile phone. After four months in detention on a charge of rape of a minor with the use of a weapon, he was certified as "redeemable" by the experts who examined him and on 26 November 2010 a judge released him on remand on the conditions that he undertake psychological therapy, leave Gard, and live as a boarder at Cévenol, the only one of seventeen schools to which his parents applied that would admit him.

Moulinas stood out as a rebel at the school, affecting a gothic style of dress, bragging of being a hacker and drug-user who had robbed pharmacies, and publicly petting his Tahitian girlfriend. He had very poor grades and in June 2011 was twice threatened with suspension, but on his return at the end of the summer, appeared to be doing better.

=== Reactions ===
When news of the murder and of Moulinas's previous offence emerged, many in France criticised both the decision to free him and place him in a co-educational boarding school and the lack of candour by the authorities; his judicial supervisor felt constrained by the presumption of innocence and by professional ethics from revealing it. The school administration in turn said they had been unaware that he was under judicial supervision or that they should inform his supervisor even when he was suspended for watching pornography on a school computer. According to a relative of his earlier victim, he had been watching X-rated films all day from the age of 16. While the prosecution argued the school was aware Moulinas had been imprisoned on a rape charge, the school stated they were not aware of the reason for his detention and judicial supervision. Marin's father said that the school was aware that Moulinas had problems involving "sexual acts of aggression"; at trial, the director of the school admitted that he had known.

In late November 2011, in response to the case, Prime Minister François Fillon announced new government rules under which juveniles accused of the most serious offences would be kept in detention pending trial and schools to which such juveniles were to be remanded would be given full information about the alleged offences prior to admission, and also called for an inquiry into improving psychological assessment of accused offenders.

== Trial and sentencing ==
Moulinas's trial before the Cour d'assises des mineurs (Note: Court for juvenile offenders accused of committing crimes (offences punishable by at least 10 years in prison)) began on 18 June 2013, in camera against the wishes of Marin's family. The public prosecutor criticised numerous institutional failings in his case and asked the jury not to grant him the benefit of minority, (Note: Under French law, the excuse de minorité results in the maximum sentence being halved, so that for life-eligible crimes the maximum sentence becomes 20 years; see fr:Justice des mineurs en France (in French).) instead requesting a 30-year sentence and civil commitment, taking into account Moulinas's mental problems.

On 28 June 2013, for the earlier rape as well as the rape and murder of Marin, Moulinas was sentenced to life imprisonment, the second time a juvenile offender had been given such a sentence in France; the first, Patrick Dils, was sentenced in 1989 (and subsequently acquitted). His lawyers announced that they would appeal the sentence the next day.

=== Appeal ===
On 10 October 2014, the Appeal Assize Court confirmed Moulinas' life sentence, this time with a lifelong care order, ending any possibility of the revision of the rulings on the facts.

== Aftermath ==
On 2016, the parents of the murderer published Parents à perpétuité, a book about their experience, which caused the victim's family to protest. During an interview, the Moulinas reported their son still didn't feel any remorse.

== See also ==
- Trial as an adult
- Recidivism
