= UWO =

UWO may refer to:

- Unexplained wealth order, a court order in the United Kingdom
- University of Western Ontario, Canada
- University of Wisconsin–Oshkosh, United States
- Unit Watts Out, a non-standard unit of power rating, a.k.a. Max Watts Out (MWO)
