= Village of Secrets =

2014 book by Caroline Moorehead

- Author: Caroline Moorehead
- Publisher: Chatto & Windus
- Publication date: United Kingdom; 2014
- Pages: 356pp.
- ISBN: 9780701186418

Village of Secrets: Defying the Nazis in Vichy France is a 2014 book by Caroline Moorehead.

== Content ==
The book is a narrative regarding the role of residents of the French village of Le Chambon-sur-Lignon, located in the mountains of the eastern Massif Central, in helping to secure the lives of Jewish people during the Second World War. According to Moorehead, villagers secured the survival of 800 Jewish refugees by hiding them and also enabled another 3,000 to get across the French border and secure safety in Switzerland. The figures involved represented the highest proportion of Jewish residents saved out of all of France at the time. The work of those who helped save them was achieved at enormous risk to their own lives. It was achieved in the face of more and more danger and risk as time went on during the war, with the introduction of a convalescent home for wounded German soldiers in the area at one point, along with more intransigent behaviour from the Germans as the Allies progressed through France towards the end of the conflict.

Organisations that were crucial in the process of helping people to survive included the Organisation de Secours aux Enfants and Cimade. The latter was a mainly Protestant organisation, which is related to one of the wider factors that helped ensure that people tried to secure the safety of the Jews: there was a long tradition in the area of Protestantism, including a Huguenot and Darbyist history, which had suffered persecution itself.

The questions of morality that arise from the story are particularly important given the view propagated by Jacques Chirac that Chambon was in fact "our country's conscience". Moorehead places the story in the context of the wider anti-semitism of the Vichy government and the Milice française, arguing against what she perceives as a recent tendency to minimise collaboration between the French and the Nazi regime and asserting that by interning Jewish people, the Vichy regime had "made it far easier for the Germans to do their work”.

== Reception ==
Moorehead's work was shortlisted for the 2014 Samuel Johnson Prize for Non-fiction. The work was widely praised by literary critics. In addition to those cited above, Louis Begley used the book as the basis for a review article about Vichy France and the Jews. Yale historian, Carolyn Dean, writes, that Moorehead "has done us the great service of unveiling the real lives behind the myth and in demonstrating that fallible human beings are far more interesting and dramatic figures than those who make up the stuff of legends.".

Despite this, the book has also been severely criticised by Pierre Sauvage, whose 1989 film Weapons of the Spirit told the story of Protestant pastors André Trocmé and Edouard Theis and their role in the resistance effort. Sauvage accuses it of misrepresenting witness accounts. Caroline Moorehead has replied to the criticism: She points out the problems of reconciling memory and history, particularly after 70 years. "I chose to think that by taking immense care to document every step of the way I would be able to steer safely between the conflicting truths. I was wrong. I have been shocked by the malice and personal nature of the attacks."
