= R v Laba =

- Supreme Court of Canada

Hearing: June 15, 1994 Judgment: December 8, 1994
- Citations: [1994] 3 S.C.R. 965

Court membership
- Chief Justice: Antonio Lamer; Puisne Justices: Gérard La Forest, Claire L'Heureux-Dubé, John Sopinka, Charles Gonthier, Peter Cory, Beverley McLachlin, Frank Iacobucci, John C. Major

Reasons given

R v Laba, [1994] 3 S.C.R. 965 is a Supreme Court of Canada decision on the presumption of innocence under section 11(d) of the Canadian Charter of Rights and Freedoms and the limitations provision under section 1.

== Background ==
Six men were charged under s. 394(1)(b) of the Criminal Code for selling or purchasing "any rock, mineral or other substance that contains precious metals unless he establishes that he is the owner or agent of the owner or is acting under lawful authority". The six men challenged the reverse onus clause which required that the accused establish that he or she was acting under lawful authority as a violation of the presumption of innocence.

== Reasons of the court ==
Justice Sopinka, writing for the Court, examined whether the provision criminalizing the trade in stolen precious metal ore could be justified under section 1 as the Crown had already conceded that it violated section 11(d). Sopinka observed that there were a variety of situations where innocent people could be charged and convicted where they are unable to prove that their ore was legal. Moreover, the purpose and history behind the provision was not sufficiently supported by facts or data that proved the trade in stolen precious metal ore was a pressing and substantial matter. Sopinka, however, found that the purpose was rationally connected to the provision. On the minimal impairment step of the Oakes test, he found that the provision was not minimally impairing nor was it proportional.

As a remedy he held that the phrase "unless he establishes that" in the reverse onus clause be struck out and instead the phrase "in the absence of evidence which raises a reasonable doubt that" be read in.

== See also ==
- List of Supreme Court of Canada cases (Lamer Court)
