= Le Collège-Lycée Cévenol International =

Coordinates: 45°04′00″N 4°18′43″E

Information
- School type: Private boarding secondary school
- Religious affiliations: Reformed Church of France (1938-1971); None (1971-2014)
- Established: 1938
- Closed: 2014
- Gender: Mixed

The Collège Cévenol—later known as Le Collège-Lycée Cévenol International—was a unique and historic international secondary school located in Le Chambon-sur-Lignon, in the département of Haute-Loire, France. It enrolled day students from the local area, along with a substantial body of regional, national, and international students from around the world who boarded at the school. The last President of its governing board (the AUCC) was Claude Le Vu; the last director was Patrick Sellier.

The Collège Cévenol was founded in 1938 by local Protestant activists and pacifists, and had been shaped from its beginnings by the area's long-standing traditions of resistance to political and religious oppression. From the beginning, the Collège promoted education linked to principles of nonviolence and the development of mutual understanding and solidarity in a socially and ethnically diverse society. The school's founders were also key organisers of the now-famous community effort in Le Chambon-sur-Lignon to shelter and save Jewish refugees during the Second World War.

During its early years, from 1938 to 1971, the school was entirely private and was associated with the Protestant Reformed Church of France, although it welcomed students regardless of their religious beliefs. From 1971 onwards, it was part of the French national education system and was secular. It was organised as an “établissement privé sous contrat d'association” (a private school associated by contract with the state), a category of French schools which are privately managed, but bound to the national system by contracts which provide basic funding and teacher's salaries, and require adherence to national curricula and other standards.

The College became national news in November 2011 because of a brutal crime, 13-year-old Agnès Marin's body was found burned, with stab wounds and raped inside the forest next to the College. A 17-year-old called Matthieu Moulinas who was on parole after raping a girl in 2010 was convicted and sentenced to life imprisonment.

On February 9, 2014, President Andre Gast announced that the College would be closing its doors at the end of the school year, due to mounting financial difficulties and declining enrollment.

== History ==
=== Founding as L’Ecole Nouvelle Cévenole ===
“Cévenol” is an adjective meaning "of the Cévennes mountains," a nearby mountain range that is historically significant as a site of resistance for French Protestants. Le Chambon and the Collège are not located in the Cévennes themselves, but just to the north, on the high Plateau Vivarais-Lignon. The "Cévenol" reference in the school's name is thus cultural and historical rather than literal, situating the school's founding within the long heritage of French Protestant (Huguenot) resistance to persecution after the Reformation, for example during the Camisard wars of the early eighteenth century. The peasant fighters called “Camisards” who struggled against the French crown were also known as “Cévenols” after the rugged, mountainous terrain that facilitated the small group's ability to resist the much larger forces arrayed against them. In the 1930s, this long-standing regional tradition of resistance and hospitality to refugees became essential to the school's beginnings.

In May 1938, at a regional synod of the French église réformée (the Reformed Church of France, historically the primary Protestant council in France), pastor André Trocmé, then assigned to the Protestant church in Le Chambon, proposed the creation of a new secondary school. His proposal envisioned a school that would address four goals:

1. Work against the rural depopulation and impoverishment of Le Chambon, then a small farming village in an isolated mountain region;
2. Provide high-quality secondary education for the children of the area's Protestant parishes;
3. Experiment with innovative educational ideas and practices that might eventually spread to the wider public school system; and
4. Provide a milieu in which teachers and students of different nationalities could meet and develop values related to internationalist ideals of cooperation and peace.

Working with Edouard Theis, another local pastor, the school's first classes were held in September 1938. On its first day, the school had four teachers and 18 students, and met in a room in the Protestant “Temple” or church of Le Chambon.

=== Shelter for refugees during World War II ===
Because of its relatively remote and protected location in Le Chambon, and because it was founded by the same pastors who became the leaders of local efforts to save refugees from Nazi occupation forces and the French Vichy regime that collaborated with them, the Cévenol school played an integral role in the now-famous efforts of the local citizenry in hiding and protecting several thousand Jewish refugees, including many children, throughout the war.

By the late 1930s, Le Chambon had become the site of several “pensions” or boarding-houses that lodged children drawn from refugee camps in the south of France for victims of the Spanish Civil War. The first pension, organised by Trocmé, was Les Grillons (Crickets), followed by several more, mostly funded by major international relief organisations. More refugees from the German occupation soon followed, including many Jewish children who were lodged and hidden among the others. During the war, Le Chambon's remote location made it attractive for other children from more war-torn areas of France as well, and the student body (including Jewish children being hidden in Le Chambon) grew rapidly, from 40 students in 1939 to 150 in 1940, 250 in 1941, 300 in 1942, and 350 to the end of the war.

André and Magda Trocmé, along with Edouard and Mildred Theis, served as both teachers at the Cévenol school and leaders of the town's collective effort to protect the refugees. In recognition of their courage and leadership, they, along with Roland Leenhardt (a future director of the school who was then a pastor in the neighboring village of Tence) and the people of Le Chambon, were later honored as “Righteous Among the Nations”, a secular award given by the State of Israel to distinguish non-Jews who risked their lives during the Holocaust to save Jews from extermination by the Nazis. Le Chambon was the first community to be recognised in this manner by Yad Vashem.

=== Second phase: building the Collège Cévenol ===
At the end of the war in 1945, a Collège Cévenol Association (now the AUCC or Association Unifiée du Collège Cévenol) was founded. In 1952, Carl and Florence Sangree, two Americans then associated with the school, founded the AFCC, the American Friends of the Collège Cévenol. A 16-hectare farm at the edge of Le Chambon was acquired as the site for a new campus. The American Association helped raise funds (from the Quaker American Friends Service Committee, among others) and organised work-camps at which the school's teachers and students, along with other volunteers, passed the summers living in large tents while they built the present school with their own hands, from clearing roads and digging trenches for pipes, to building a classroom building, dormitories, and fields for sports. For decades, the original stone farmhouse, called Luquet, housed a makeshift gym, library, refectory, and offices; the refectory is still housed there today. The first dormitories were prefabricated wooden chalets donated by friends of the school in Sweden. The “Batisco” or Batiment Scolaire (the main classroom building used today) was opened in 1953; the science labs in 1957; and a new, relatively comfortable girls' dormitory (Milflor) in 1959.

In its first decades especially, the Collège developed a collective culture distinct from that of other secondary schools. It was a co-educational school from the beginning; male and female students were mixed together in a manner that was relatively rare in French schools, and especially in French boarding schools. The school was open in both a material and an educational sense: it had no walls or gates, and students were encouraged and expected to govern themselves to a significant extent. The school's pacifist and activist origins, its summer work-camps, remote location, and somewhat spartan living conditions for boarding students, encouraged a situation in which teachers and students lived, ate, and worked together in the same modest setting, relatively isolated from the aggressively consumerist and mediatic culture of the early Cold War.

Through the 1960s, students and teachers together developed a community that, within the limits imposed by the school's Protestant orientation, emphasised tolerance and independence vis-à-vis dominant ways of thinking. Activities that were relatively rare for the period, such as a student-run assembly, radio station, and magazine, were initiated during these years. Notable teachers during this early period included the philosopher Paul Ricoeur and the writer and nonviolence activist Lanza del Vasto, one of the principal western followers of Mohandas Karamchand Gandhi. Notable students from the early years include Alexander Grothendieck, one of the key mathematicians of the twentieth century and a dedicated anti-war activist who had escaped the camps as a child refugee in Le Chambon during the war, and Delphine Seyrig, an actress and activist now remembered for her roles in a series of important films in the 1960s and 1970s.

=== Third and fourth phases: the Collège-Lycée Cévenol ===
After 1971, the school became part of the French national education system. After growing to an enrollment of about 500 during the 1980s and 1990s, the school encountered financial difficulties and its enrollment returned to around 300 after 1997. Since that time, the school has gradually improved its funding and seeks to renew its unique history and culture in the conditions of the 21st century.

In 2011, the school attracted media attention because of the murder of Agnès Marin by Matthieu Moulinas, both being pupils here.

In its last terms the Collège enrolled students from about 30 different nations each year, working in classes from the Quatrième (the equivalent of 9th grade in the US) to Terminale (the 13th and final or "terminal" year in the French primary-secondary system, during which students prepare for the Baccalauréat examination). It continued to play a role in the local hosting and relief of refugees from conflicts in the Balkans and Eastern Europe.

The school maintained partnerships and exchange agreements with several other secondary schools oriented toward international education:

- Concord Academy (Massachusetts, US)
- Colegio Internacional Europa (Sevilla, Spain)
- Goethe-Gymnasium/Rutheneum (Gera (Germany)
- Liceo Valdese de Torre Pellice (Italy, a school associated with UNESCO)
- Lycée Edmond-Maurice-Edmond de Rothschild de Tel Aviv (Israel)
- Soukromé Jazykové Gymnázium in Hradec Králové (Czech Republic)

School enrollment dropped to 87 pupils in the wake of Agnès Marin's murder, below the 90 pupils required to make the school financially viable.

The school went into receivership in May 2013. It closed at the end of the 2013-2014 school year.

== Governing Board (AUCC) and school associations ==
The school's governing board was the Association Unifiée du Collège Cévenol (AUCC). Its meetings assembled representatives of alumni organisations and several French and international Protestant relief organisations. An Association des Anciens du Collège Cévenol (AACC) now provides organisation for meetings and fundraising among alumni in France and Europe, beginning with a 70th Anniversary weekend held in Chambon in May 2009. The APCC (Association des Parents du CC) provided information and networking for parents of enrolled students.

== American Friends of the Collège Cévenol (AFCC) ==
The American Friends, a non-profit organisation founded in 1952, unites alumni and friends of the Collège from all of the phases of the school's history. It contributed to the school by organizing an annual fundraising drive among the school's US alumni and by continuing the tradition of the summer work camps that went back to the school's earliest years. The work camps were three-week summer sessions organised for high school and college-age students who experienced the atmosphere of Le Chambon and the Collège during the very pleasant summer season in the mountains, worked at community service projects and basic maintenance or repair tasks at the school, and improved their French-language skills.

== Notable alumni and faculty ==
The French Wikipedia article on the Collège Cévenol provides French-language links to articles on many of these individuals:

- Kate Barry (1967–2013); photographer
- Guy Bechtel (1931–); historian, author of numerous studies in French early-modern history and culture
- Pierre Bénichou (1938–); journalist and writer, member of the Légion d'honneur
- Robert Benoît (1943–); actor-director known for work in films, television, and theatre; appeared alongside fellow Cévenol alum Delphine Seyrig in The Discreet Charm of the Bourgeoisie (1972)
- Christophe Berthonneau (1964–); theatre director, award-winning pyro-designer and founder of Group F, creator of major fireworks performances including opening and closing ceremonies of numerous Olympic Games during the 1990s and 2000s
- Michael Bess, Department of History, Vanderbilt University, author of "Choices under fire. Moral dimensions of World War II" Chapter 6 on Chambon-sur-Lignon.
- Émile Blessig (1947–); politician, currently a member of the National Assembly of France representing the Département of Bas-Rhin
- Jacques Boré (1927–); attorney and judge, elected a member of the Académie des Sciences Morales et Politiques in 1991
- Jean-Jacques Bourdin (1949–); writer and sports journalist
- Jean-Louis Cheminée (1937–2003); geologist and volcanologist, director of the Volcanological Observatories of the Institute of Geophysics of Paris (IPGP, l'Institut de Physique du Globe de Paris)
- Jane Abell Coon (1929–); American Ambassador Extraordinary and Plenipotentiary to Bangladesh 1981–1984 and career FSO
- Stéphane Courtois (1947–); historian and senior research scientist at the Centre National de la Recherche Scientifique (CNRS)
- Catherine de Seynes (1930–); film actress, playwright, and theatre director, appeared in films by major directors Alain Resnais and Agnès Varda, and appears along with fellow Cévenol alumna Delphine Seyrig in Muriel, ou le temps d'un retour (1963)
- Christiane Doré; Inspector-General of the Conseil Géneral des Technologies de l'Information (CGTI, the French national agency charged with oversight and reform of information technologies)
- Paul Dopff; filmmaker
- Elizabeth Fox-Genovese (1941–2007); American historian, author of important studies in US antebellum southern history and women's studies
- Alexander Grothendieck (1928–2014); German-born mathematical theorist and activist, renowned for important advances in algebraic geometry, number theory, and functional analysis; attended Collège Cévenol as a hidden refugee during the war; awarded the Fields Medal for mathematics in 1966; declined the Crafoord Prize in 1988.
- John Woodland Hastings (1927–2014); American biologist and Paul C. Manglesdorf Professor of Natural Sciences at Harvard University, elected in 2003 to the US National Academy of Sciences
- Jean Hatzfeld (1949–); journalist and novelist, winner of the Prix Décembre in 1994, the Prix Femina Essay prize in 2003, and the Prix Médicis literary prize in 2007
- Guy Lagache (1966–); television journalist
- Lanza del Vasto (Giuseppe Giovanni Luigi Enrico Lanza di Trabia; 1901–1981); philosopher, poet, artist, and nonviolence activist
- François Lavondès (1932–2025); political administrator and advisor to President Georges Pompidou
- Roland Leenhardt (1913–1966); minister, third director of the Collège, and a co-organiser of Chambon-area resistance efforts, recognised as Righteous Among the Nations
- Jérôme Monod (1930–2016); industrialist and politician, one of the architects of the RPR (Rally for the Republic) party in the 1970s and of the UMP (Union for a Popular Movement) party in the 2000s, a close associate and advisor to President Jacques Chirac
- Paul Nahon (1947–); television journalist and news director for the France 3 network, current director as of 2009 for France 3 Sud
- Franck Pavloff (1940–); educator, editor and novelist, winner of the Prix France-Télévisions in 2005 for his novel Le Pont de Ran-Mositar
- Pierre Péchin (1947–); comedian, radio announcer, and winner of several French comedy awards in the 1970s
- Olivier Philip (1925–); cabinet minister under President Georges Pompidou, Prefect of several departments and regions from the 1950s to the 1980s, and member of the Légion d'honneur
- Loïc Philip (1932–); Writer, jurist, emeritus professor of law at the Université Paul Cézanne d'Aix-Marseille, elected to the Académie des Sciences Morales et Politiques in 2000
- Paul Ricœur (1913–2005); philosopher and a major figure in hermeneutic phenomenology, winner of the 1999 Balzan Prize for Philosophy and the second recipient, in 2003, of the Kluge Prize for lifetime achievement in the human sciences
- Gilles Roussi (1947–); sculptor, writer, and director of the École supérieure art & design de Saint-Étienne (School for Advanced Studies in Art & Design of Saint-Etienne)
- Jérôme Savary (1942–2013); theatre director, playwright, actor, member of the Ordre des Arts et Lettres and the Legion d'honneur
- Simon Schakhine (1927–); novelist, journalist, theatre director; attended Cévenol while hidden as French Jewish child refugee in Chambon during the war, before moving to Tel Aviv in the late 1950s and beginning a career as a francophone writer living in Israel
- Richard Seaver (1926–2009); American translator, editor, and publisher, influential as editor in chief of Grove Press, president and publisher of Holt, Rinehart and Winston's trade division, and founder of Arcade Publishing
- Delphine Seyrig (1932–1990); actor-director and women's rights activist, best known for her work in important films such as Last Year in Marienbad, Stolen Kisses, The Discreet Charm of the Bourgeoisie, and Jeanne Dielman
- Robert Storr (1949–); American art critic, curator, and painter, named Dean of the Yale University School of Art in 2006, Director of the 2007 Venice Biennale
- Élizabeth Teissier (1938–); model, television host, and astrologer
- Edouard Theis (1899–1984) and Mildred Theis; Edouard Theis and his wife Mildred, along with the Trocmés, were the earliest teachers at the school. Both were leaders of resistance organisation in Chambon and recognised as Righteous Among the Nations. Edouard served as the school's first director until his retirement in 1963.
- Nicola Trahan MBE (1926-2024) was an SOE courier and military social worker.
- André Trocmé (1901–1971); André Trocmé was a minister, the school's founder and a leader of resistance organisation in Chambon, recognised as Righteous Among the Nations
- Magda Trocmé-Grilli di Cortona (1901–1996); one of the school's first teachers and an area resistance activist in her own right, along with her husband André. Also recognised as Righteous Among the Nations
- Paul Trân Van Thinh (1929–); Vietnamese-born economist and attorney, former French ambassador to the European Commission and head of the European Union delegation to General Agreement on Tariffs and Trade (GATT) and World Trade Organisation negotiations from 1960 to 1994
- Georges Vajda (1908–1981); Hungarian-born historian, pioneering figure in Jewish Studies, and director of Arabic and Hebrew Studies at the CNRS; driven into hiding in Chambon during the war, Vajda taught Greek and Latin at Cévenol and wrote his first important history while living in Chambon, before returning to Paris after 1946 to become director at the Haute Ecole des Etudes Pratiques, Section des Sciences Religieuses.
- Laurent Wauquiez (1975–); 2008–14 Mayor of Le Puy-en-Velay and as of July 2012 a national député for Haute-Loire's 1st district. Wauquiez held several posts under the Sarkozy administration (2007–12), including Minister of European Affairs, Secretary of State for European Affairs, and Minister of Higher Education and Research.
- Christian Zuber (1930–2005); filmmaker and animal rights activist, administrator for the World Wide Fund for Nature (WWF) and the Bardot Foundation

== External links and web resources ==
Collège Cévenol official website (in French): https://web.archive.org/web/20030830015045/http://www.lecevenol.org/ (in French) (information for applications, enrollment, calendar, etc.)

American Friends of the Collège Cévenol (in English): https://web.archive.org/web/20070122143709/http://www.cevenolfriends.org/ (information on summer workcamp program)

French Alumni site for the history of the Collège (in French): http://collegecevenol.pasteur.ch/ (in French) (information on meetings; reminiscences, photos, etc.)

The Collège Cévenol Forever (in French) : http://www.collegecevenol.org/ (in French) (information on present and future of College)

== Print and visual resources on Chambon and the Collège during World War II ==
Historical scholarship

Boismorand, Pierre, ed. Magda et André Trocmé: Figures de résistances. Texts selected and edited par Pierre Boismorand. Preface by Lucien Lazare. Paris: Editions du Cerf, 2008. (A French-language collection of excerpts from the writings of Magda and André Trocmé)

Bolle, Pierre, ed. Le Plateau Vivarais-Lignon: Accueil et Résistance, 1939-1944. Actes du Colloque du Chambon-sur-Lignon. Le Chambon-sur-Lignon: Société de l'Histoire de la Montagne, 1992.

Debiève, Roger. Mémoires meurtries, mémoire trahie: Le Chambon-sur-Lignon. Paris: L'Harmattan, 1995.

Draper, Allison Stark Pastor Andre Trocme: Spiritual Leader Le Chambon (Holocaust Biographies), Rosen Pub Group; 1st edition (September 2001)

Flaud, Annik & Gérard Bollon, préface de Simone Veil. "Paroles de Réfugiés, Paroles de Justes." Le Cheylard : Editions Dolmazon, 2009.

Fox, Deborah. "Magda Trocmé: A Mother Responds, "Hineni!" Shofar: An Interdisciplinary Journal of Jewish Studies 24.3 (2006), 90–99.

Hallie, Philip. Lest Innocent Blood Be Shed: The Story of Le Chambon and How Goodness Happened There. New York: Harper & Row, 1979.

Hatzfeld, Olivier. Le Collège Cévenol a Cinquante Ans. Le Chambon-sur-Lignon: Collège Cévenol, 1989.

Henry, Patrick (Patrick Gerard). "Banishing the Coercion of Despair: Le Chambon-sur-Lignon and the Holocaust Today." Shofar: An Interdisciplinary Journal of Jewish Studies 20.2 (2002), 69–84.

Lecomte, Fracois and Trocme, Jacques, I Will Never Be Fourteen Years Old: Le Chambon-sur-Lignon & My Second Life, Beach Lloyd Publishers, LLC; first edition (July 1, 2009)

McIntyre, Michael. "Altruism, Collective Action, and Rationality: The Case of Le Chambon." Polity 27.4 (1995), 537–557.

Paldiel, Mordecai. The Path of the Righteous: Gentile Rescuers of Jews During the Holocaust. Hoboken: KTAV Publishing, 1993.

Rochat, François and André Modigliani. "The Ordinary Quality of Resistance: from Milgram's Laboratory to the Village of Le Chambon." Journal of Social Issues 51.3 (1995), 195–210.

Ruelle, Karen Gray and Desaix, Deborah Durland Hidden on the Mountain: Stories of Children Sheltered from the Nazis in Le Chambon Holiday House; First Edition (February 1, 2007)

Sauvage, Pierre, with Magda Trocmé, Philip Hallie, Hans Solomon, Hanne Liebmann, Rudy Appel. "Le Chambon." In Carol Rittner and Sondra Myers, eds., The Courage to Care: Rescuers of Jews During the Holocaust (New York: New York University Press, 1986), 99–121.

Unsworth, Richard P.A Portrait of Pacifists: Le Chambon, the Holocaust and the Lives of Andre and Magda Trocme (Religion, Theology, and the Holocaust, Peter I. Rose (Foreword) Syracuse University Press, March 15, 2012

Fiction, memoir, and young adult books

Boegner, Philippe. Ici on a aimé les Juifs. Paris: J. C. Lattès, 1982. (A memoir-novel).

DeSaix, Deborah Durland and Karen Gray Ruelle. Hidden on the Mountain: Stories of Children Sheltered from the Nazis in Le Chambon. New York: Holiday House, 2007. (Stories of Chambon hidden children, with many historical photographs).

Lecomte, François. I Will Never Be Fourteen Years Old: Le Chambon-sur-Lignon and My Second Life. Tr. Jacques Trocmé. Wayne PA: Beach Lloyd Publishers, 2009. (Memoir).

Lecomte, François. "Jamais je n'aurai quatorze ans." Paris : Le Manuscrit / Fondation pour la Mémoire de la Shoah, 2005.

Matas, Carol. Greater Than Angels. New York: Simon Pulse / Simon & Schuster, 1999. (Young Adult Fiction).

Films

Barnett, Barbara P. and Eileen M. Angelini. La France divisée. Rosemont PA: The Agnes Irwin School Holocaust Project, 2002. 36 minutes.

Gardner, Robert. The Courage to Care. US: United Way Productions, 1985. 29 minutes. (Oscar-nominated in “short documentary” category, 1985).

Lorenzi, Jean-Louis. Le Chambon: La Colline aux Mille Enfants / The Hill of the Thousand Children. King Movies / Cameras Continentales, France 2, France 3 and others, 1994. 118 minutes. (Made-for-Television fictionalised feature film; International Emmy Award, Drama Category, 1996).

Maous, Thierry and Silvia Salamon. La banalité du bien / The Banality of Good. Zoulou Compagnie. 30 minutes. Documentary film; first broadcast 30 October 2011.

Sauvage, Pierre. Weapons of the Spirit / Les armes de l'esprit. (Documentary Film). US/France: Chambon Foundation, 1987. 90 minutes. (Aired in the US by PBS; Los Angeles Film Critics Association Special Award, 1987). Also available in 35-minute version.

Vella, Pierre. Le Cévenol. (Documentary Film). France: France 3 Télévision, 2010. 30 minutes. First Broadcast 25 April 2010.
