= Interim freezing order =

An interim freezing order is a type of court order issued by a British court to freeze access to a person's property while they are under investigation.

== See also ==
- Unexplained wealth order
- Asset freezing
- Criminal Finances Act 2017
