= Zamira Hajiyeva =

Azerbaijani expatriate in the UK

- Born: 18 July 1963 (age 63)
- Spouse: Jahangir Hajiyev
- Children: 2 sons, 1 daughter

Zamira Shirali qizi Hajiyeva (Azerbaijani: Zamirə Şirəli qızı Hacıyeva [zɑmiˈɾæ ʃiɾæˈli ɡɯˈzɯ hɑˈdʒɯjevɑ]; born 18 July 1963) is an Azerbaijani expatriate in the United Kingdom. She is married to Jahangir Hajiyev, a former chairman of the International Bank of Azerbaijan who has since been jailed there for financial crimes. In 2018 she became the first recipient of an unexplained wealth order under a new UK anti-corruption law. She was known as "Mrs A" during the legal proceedings before her identity was revealed.

It was disclosed in court that Hajiyeva had spent £16.3 million at London's department store Harrods, as well as several other multi-million pound purchases – expenditure which the British authorities say is out of keeping with her husband's official salary. On 30 October 2018 she was arrested by British police acting on an extradition request from the Azerbaijani government. Her extradition was blocked on the grounds she will be unable to get a fair trial in her home country because the Azerbaijani judiciary is not independent of the Azerbaijani regime.

== Early life and family ==
Zamira Hajiyeva was born on 18 July 1963. During her first marriage, she had a daughter, Leyla. In 1997 she married Jahangir Hajiyev, later the chairman of the state-owned International Bank of Azerbaijan from 2001 to March 2015. In October 2016, he was sentenced to 15 years in prison on charges of fraud, embezzlement, and misappropriation of public funds. The fraud is as much as £2.2 billion.

The couple have two sons. Leyla was recorded in court documents as having a £15 million share portfolio and is married to Anar Mahmudov, the son of Eldar Mahmudov, Azerbaijan's former Security Minister.

== Kidnapping ==
In February 2005, Hajiyeva was kidnapped as she left the Magic Lady beauty salon in Baku, and held to ransom. Azerbaijan media and the BBC reported that the kidnap was carried out by the police officer Haji Mammadov (Hacı Məmmədov), chief operating officer of the Ministry of Internal Affairs, and his bodyguard who were part of a criminal gang. An operation codenamed Black Belt resulted in Hajiyeva's release in March of that year. Gunshots were fired during the operation and at least one person died. Mammadov claimed during his trial in 2006 that he was acting on the orders of Zakir Nasirov, head of the Interior Ministry's Chief Criminal Investigation Department.

== Move to Britain ==
In 2006, Hajiyeva moved to UK and was later granted permission to live there by the Home Office under an investor visa. She applied for indefinite leave to remain in 2015; as of October 2018, it was unclear whether she had subsequently acquired British citizenship.

In 2016, she was placed under arrest in absentia by an Azerbaijan court in connection with her husband's activities.

== Unexplained wealth order ==
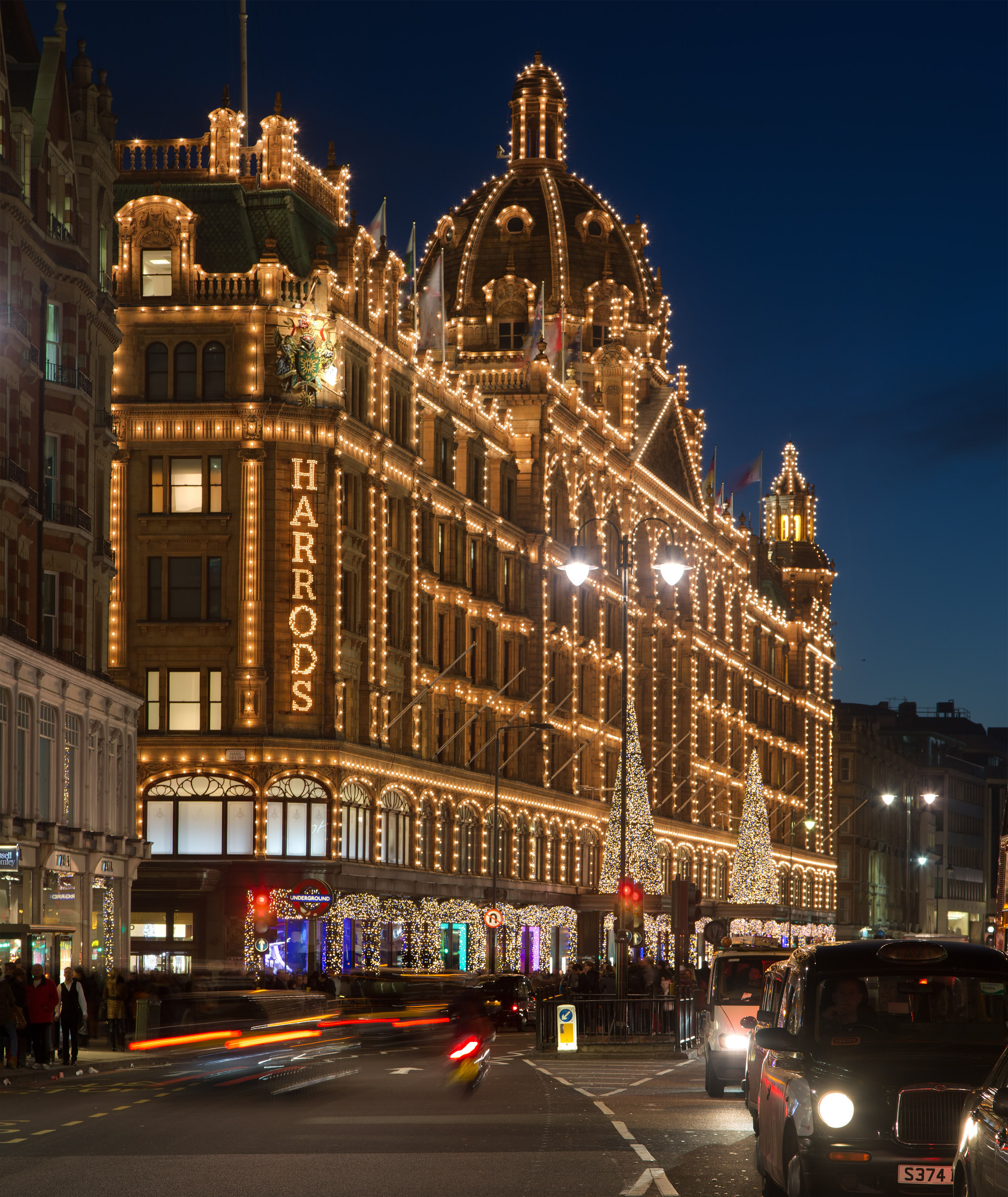
Harrods at night, 2012

Since arriving in the UK, Hajiyeva has spent significant sums of money that the British authorities say are out of keeping with her husband's official salary. In 2018, she became the first person to receive an unexplained wealth order under a new UK anti-corruption law, and has to provide a "clear account" of the source of her spending, which included:

- Spending just over £16.3 million between 2006 and 2016 at London's upmarket department store Harrods using 54 different credit cards.
- Purchasing a five-bedroom house in Walton Street, Knightsbridge, close to Harrods, for £11.5 million using a British Virgin Islands company in 2009.
- Spending £10.5 million on the purchase of the 170-acre Mill Ride Golf and Country Club in Ascot, Berkshire.
- Spending $42 million on a Gulfstream G550 jet.

Hajiyeva was arrested on 30 October 2018 by British police acting on an extradition request from the Azerbaijani authorities in connection with two charges of embezzlement. She was later released on bail, with a £500,000 bond, an electronic tagging device and other conditions. Her extradition was blocked on 26 September 2019 at Westminster Magistrates Court by Emma Arbuthnot, chief magistrate senior, on the grounds she will be unable to get a fair trial in her home country.

In November 2018, the National Crime Agency seized 49 items of jewellery worth around £400,000 from Mrs Hajiyeva and in January 2019 they seized a diamond Cartier ring worth almost £1.2 million.

In February 2020, Hajiyeva lost her appeal against the National Crime Agency's bid to reveal the source of her money.

== See also ==
- List of kidnappings
