= Nicola Trahan =

French resistance member during World War II (1926–2024)

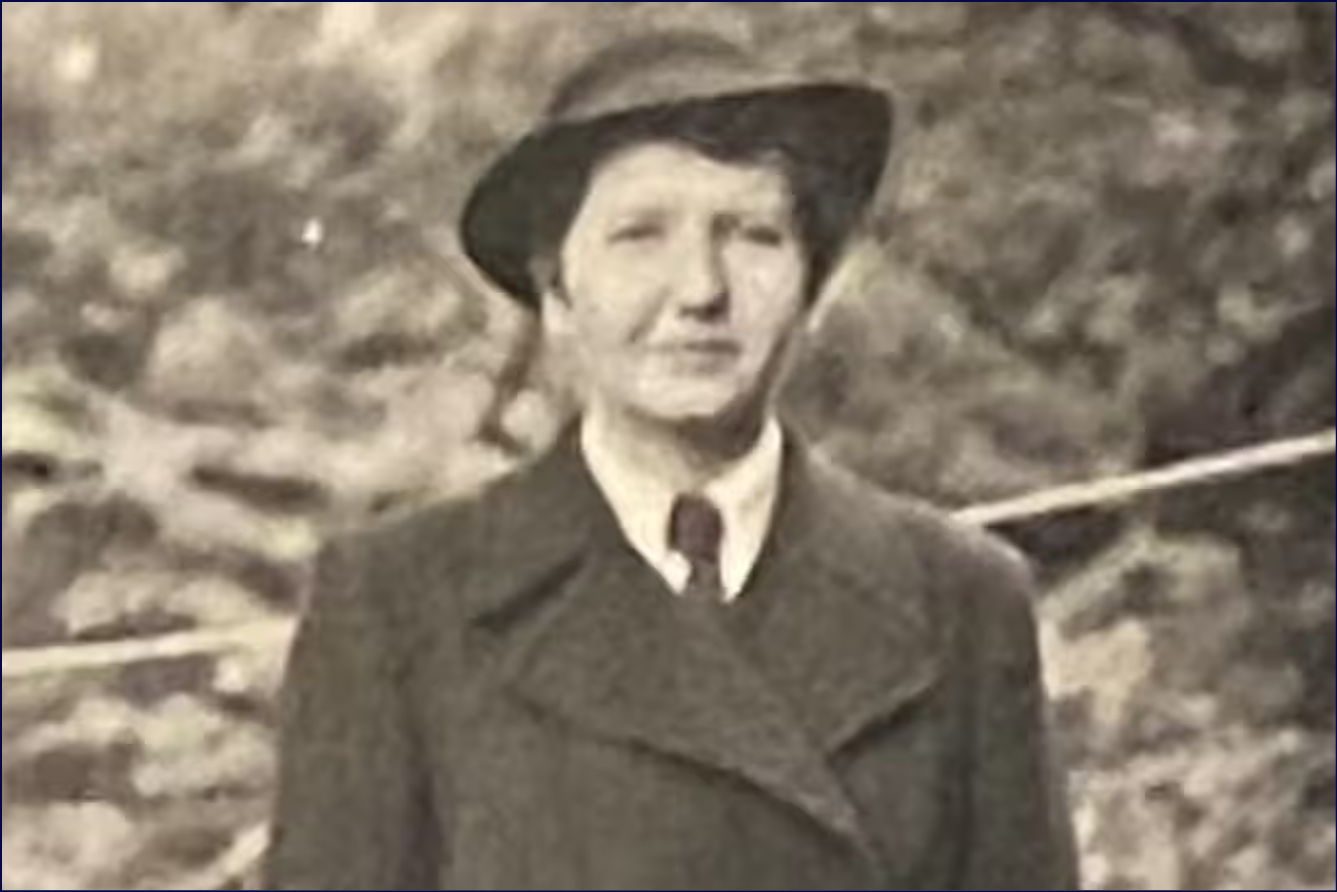
- Trahan in the 1950s
- Born: Nicole Pauline Marie Trahan; 21 December 1926; Berck-sur-Mer
- Died: 18 January 2024 (aged 97); Orcheston, Wiltshire
- Known for: Member of the French Resistance

Nicola Trahan MBE (21 December 1926, Pas de Calais, France – 18 January 2024, Orchestron, Wiltshire) was a member of the French resistance and military social worker.

== Early life ==
Nicole Pauline Marie Trahan was the daughter of André and Jeanne Marie (née Bourzes) Trahan. She was born in France where her father was a businessman and her mother was an English teacher. Before the family moved to England, Trahan attended the Le Collège-Lycée Cévenol International which was known for its pacifist teachings. Once in England Trahan was intent on assisting the French resistance and she was interviewed by a "Major Tom." Seen as ideal courier material she received parachute training at RAF Ringway.

== Resistance Work ==
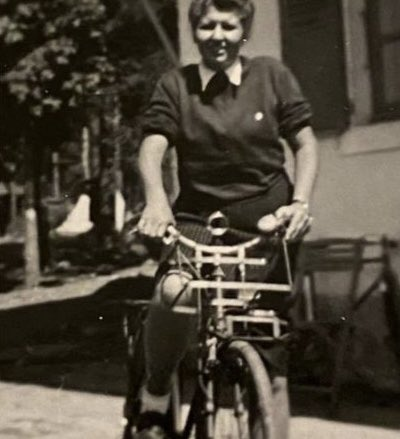
A young Nicola Trahan on a bicycle

Unfortunately the following extract taken from The Times obituary has now been proven incorrect and the BBC have now changed their article to reflect the new information that Nicola worked as a resistance courier and not an SOE agent.

The Times printed the following incorrect information: “With codename 'Teddy', Trahan was sent on her first mission in late 1943 to France. Initially dropping off messages or money, on a later mission she was dropped near Champagnole where she was involved in the smuggling of Jews into Switzerland. After D-Day she was more actively involved on the ground in sabotage and offensive action. “

In her recommendation for the 1949 Croix de Guerre (with palm), it was stated that she:

"joined the secret army then the North Indian Maquis, carrying out numerous dangerous missions. Despite very dense enemy occupation, [she] provided regular twice-daily liaison between two command posts. Notably distinguished herself at Valençay from 20 to 30 August 1944 by bringing valuable information, which she gathered at the heart of enemy operations, to her commander."

There have been recent claims that Nicola was a member of SOE. This has been verified by a number of SOE historians as incorrect. She was attending school in France during the time they are claiming she was being trained in the UK.

She was also awarded the Medal of French Gratitude in 1948.

Her personnel file at the National Archives has not been found so what she did in the aftermath of the Libération is unknown.

== Post-war ==
After the war Trahan studied philosophy at the Sorbonne, but abandoned her studies to return to England where she trained as a nurse in Manchester. She worked in Cheshire and at the American Hospital of Paris. In 1958 she joined the SSAFA, and the Armed Forces charity, the Soldiers', Sailors', and Airmen's Families Association. She worked as health visitor in Belgium, Germany and Hong Kong and was awarded an MBE in 1989. She was finally presented with "parachute wings"" by the commander of 16 Air Assault Brigade in 2017. She died at the age of 97 in Orcheston as one of the last surviving female members of this secret World War II network.
