= Caroline Moorehead =

British activist and journalist

Caroline Moorehead OBE FRSL
- Born: Caroline Mary Moorehead; 28 October 1944 (age 81); London
- Education: University of London
- Occupations: Biographer; historian; human rights journalist; literary critic
- Relatives: Alan Moorehead (father)
- Writing career
- Subject: Human rights

Caroline Mary Moorehead OBE FRSL (born 28 October 1944) is a human rights journalist and biographer.

== Early life ==
Born in London, Moorehead is the daughter of Australian war correspondent Alan Moorehead and his English wife Lucy Milner. She received a BA from the University of London in 1965.

== Writing ==
Moorehead has written eight biographies, of Bertrand Russell, Heinrich Schliemann, Freya Stark, Iris Origo, Martha Gellhorn, Sidney Bernstein, Edda Mussolini, and Henriette-Lucy, Marquise de La Tour du Pin Gouvernet. The latter figure was the daughter-in-law of Jean-Frédéric de la Tour du Pin, who experienced the French Revolution and left a rich collection of letters as well as a memoir covering the decades from the fall of the Ancien Régime to the rise of Napoleon III.

Moorehead has also written many non-fiction pieces centered on human rights including a history of the International Committee of the Red Cross, Dunant's Dream, based on previously unseen archives in Geneva, Troublesome People, a book on pacifists, and a work on terrorism, Hostages to Fortune. A work in this category on refugees in the modern world, Human Cargo, was published in 2004. Moorehead has also published A Train in Winter, a book which focuses on 230 French women of the Resistance who were sent to Auschwitz, on Convoi des 31000, and of whom only forty-nine survived. Her book Village of Secrets (2014) is on a similar theme, describing a story where a wartime French village helped 3,000 Jews to safety.

Moorehead has written many book reviews for assorted papers and reviews, including Literary Review, The Times Literary Supplement, Daily Telegraph, Independent, Spectator, and New York Review of Books. She specialized in human rights as a journalist, contributing a column first to The Times and then the Independent, and co-producing and writing a series of programs on human rights for BBC Television.

== Appointments ==
She is a trustee and director of Index on Censorship and a governor of the British Institute of Human Rights. She has served on the committees of the Royal Society of Literature, of which she is a Fellow; the Society of Authors; English PEN; and the London Library. She also helped start a legal advice centre for asylum seekers from the Horn of Africa in Cairo, where she helps run a number of educational projects.

== Honours ==
She was elected a Fellow of the Royal Society of Literature in 1993. She was appointed an OBE in 2005 for services to literature.

== Selected publications ==
- Hostages to Fortune: A Study of Kidnapping in the World Today. New York: Atheneum, 1980. ISBN 0689109997
- Sidney Bernstein: A Biography. London: J. Cape, 1984. ISBN 0224019341
- Freya Stark. New York, N.Y., U.S.A.: Viking, 1986. ISBN 0670806757
- Troublesome People: Enemies of War: 1916-1986. London: Hamilton, 1987. ISBN 0241121051
- Betrayal: A Report on Violence Toward Children in Today's World. New York: Doubleday, 1990. ISBN 0385410972
- Bertrand Russell: A Life. New York: Viking, 1992. ISBN 067085008X
- Lost and Found: The 9,000 Treasures of Troy : Heinrich Schliemann and the Gold That Got Away. New York: Viking, 1996. ISBN 0670856797
- Dunant's Dream: War, Switzerland, and the History of the Red Cross. New York: Carroll & Graf Pub, 1999. ISBN 0786706090
- Iris Origo: Marchesa of Val D'Orcia. Boston: David R. Godine, 2002. ISBN 1567921833
- Gellhorn: A Twentieth-Century Life. New York: H. Holt, 2003. ISBN 0805065539
- Human Cargo: A Journey Among Refugees. New York: H. Holt, 2005. ISBN 0805074430
- Dancing to the Precipice: The Life of Lucie De La Tour Du Pin, Eyewitness to an Era. New York: HarperCollins, 2009. ISBN 9780061684418
- A Train in Winter: An Extraordinary Story of Women, Friendship, and Resistance in Occupied France. New York: HarperCollins Publishers, 2011. ISBN 9780061650703
- Village of Secrets: Defying the Nazis in Vichy France. Harper, 2014. ISBN 9780062202475
- A Bold and Dangerous Family: The Remarkable Story of An Italian Mother, Her Two Sons, and Their Fight Against Fascism. Harper, 2017 ISBN 9780062308320
- A House in the Mountains: The Women Who Liberated Italy from Fascism. Harper. 28 January 2020. ISBN 978-0-06-268638-1.
- Mussolini's Daughter: The Most Dangerous Woman in Europe. Harper. 2022. ISBN 0062967258.
