= Jahangir Hajiyev =

Azerbaijani convicted fraudster and former banker

- Born: 26 October 1961 (age 64)
- Education: Azerbaijan State University; University of Texas at Austin; Institute of Economics, Russian Academy of Sciences
- Occupations: Civil Servant: Ministry of Foreign Economic Relations of Azerbaijan, 1993-1995; Chairman of the International Bank of Azerbaijan, 1995-2015
- Spouse: Zamira Hajiyeva

Jahangir Fevzi oglu Hajiyev (Azerbaijani: Cahangir Fevzi oğlu Hacıyev [dʒɑhɑɲˈɟiɾ fevˈzi oɣˈlu hɑˈdʒɯjef]; born 26 October 1961) is an Azerbaijani former banker and convicted fraudster.

He was the chairman of the International Bank of Azerbaijan from 2001 until he resigned in March 2015 citing health concerns. Under his stewardship, the bank had grown to become one of the prominent financial institutions in the Caucasus. The bank also played a key role in the Azerbaijani Laundromat scandal.

On 14 October 2016, the Baku Court for Grave Crimes sentenced Hajiyev to 15 years on charges of fraud, embezzlement, and misappropriation of public funds

== Education ==
Hajiyev attended Azerbaijan State University and graduated in 1986. In 1993, he earned an MBA at the University of Texas at Austin, and was awarded a Ph.D. in International Economics from the Institute of Economics, Russian Academy of Sciences in 2005.

== Career ==
Hajiyev worked in the Ministry of Foreign Economic Relations of Azerbaijan from 1993 to 1995.

He joined the International Bank of Azerbaijan in 1995. In an interview with the Azerbaijan Press Agency (APA) Hajiyev noted that the optimal number of banks in Azerbaijan must be 20 and said "I['ve] always supported market regulation. The banks that want to increase authorized capital will do that, because this is important for banks which need high positions".

Under Hajiyev's stewardship, IBA grew at an unprecedented speed, especially in the Caucasus area of Central Asia. IBA became a founder of the Baku Interbank Currency Exchange, Baku Stock Exchange, AzeriCard processing center, International Insurance Company, the Joint Leasing Company, and was the first bank to have established its presence outside the country, in Moscow and Georgia. The bank also opened representation offices in London, Frankfurt, Luxemburg, New York, and Dubai. These successes led to CISTRAN Finance declaring IBA one of the 1,000 most stable banks in the world in 2013.

== Criminal charges ==
Jahangir Hajiyev, along with 7 other persons, was accused of embezzling public funds amounting to 211.59 million AZN (125 million euros) under articles #178.3.2 and 179.1 of the Azerbaijan's Criminal Code. On December 5, 2015, an Azerbaijani court detained Jahangir Hajiyev for crimes of fraud and misappropriation of public funds. He faced charges under Articles 179.3.1 and 179.3.2 (misappropriation of a large amount of money by an organised group), 308.2 (abuse of official powers resulting in serious consequences), 309.2 (exceeding officials powers resulting in serious consequences), 313 (service forgery), and 228.1 and 228.4 (illegal acquisition, transfer, selling, storage, transportation or carrying of a weapon, its accessories, ammunition or explosives) of the Criminal Code of Azerbaijan.

On October 14, 2016, a Baku court sentenced former chairman of the board of the International Bank of Azerbaijan (IBA) Jahangir Hajiyev to 15 years imprisonment for grave crimes. Additionally, the Court decided that Mr Hajiyev had to pay 63 million AZN (to Azerbaijan International Bank and 7 million AZN to Agro-credit CJSC. According to the findings of the Court, as a result of Jahangir Hajiyev’s criminal activity of money laundering more than 9 billion dollars were laundered from the financial turnover of Azerbaijan.

This is considered to be one of the factors that caused a drop in macroeconomic indicators of the country, since the laundered amount makes up approximately 25% of Azerbaijan's average GDP for 2016/2017. Reportedly, after being allocated by the bank, money was almost completely laundered and transferred abroad to the personal accounts of Hajiyev, his relatives and counterparts.

According to the facts of the case, the most frequently used scheme was issuing of non-refundable loans for fictional expenses or fictional income projects. For the laundering scheme shell companies were established both in Azerbaijan and abroad (mainly in offshore jurisdictions). And as security for loans fictional pledges (bills of exchange, guarantees) were presented. Hajiyev and his lawyers declined all the crime charges and indicated that all bank loans were given under the permission of Central Bank and Ministry of Finance. Furthermore, due to the Azerbaijani's government abysmal human rights record and considerations of Hajiyev's specific trial, the UK Magistrates' Court ruled that the government's extradition request for Zamira Hajiyeva, Jahangir Hajiyev's wife, would be denied. The judge cited a serious possibility of her receiving a "flagrant denial of justice" in the Azerbaijani court system, thereby suggesting that Jahangir Hajiyev himself was unlikely to have received anything resembling a fair trial.

== Personal life ==
Hajiyev is married to Zamira Hajiyeva, the first person to receive an Unexplained Wealth Order, under a new UK anti-corruption law.

In September 2019, the Azerbaijani government's request for her extradition was denied by the British Magistrates' court due to a "real risk" that she could suffer a "flagrant denial of justice".
