= André and Magda Trocmé =

French husband-and-wife protectors of Jewish refugees; Righteous Among the Nations

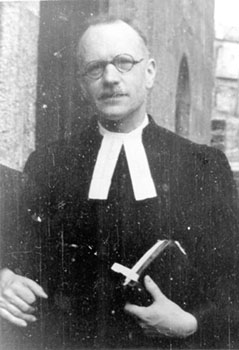
Pastor André Trocmé c. 1941

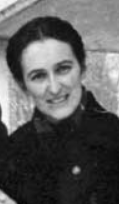
Magda Trocmé

André Trocmé (April 7, 1901 – June 5, 1971) and his wife, Magda (née Grilli di Cortona, November 2, 1901 – October 10, 1996), were a French couple who have been designated Righteous Among the Nations for saving thousands of people from Nazi persecution. For 15 years, André served as a Protestant pastor in the French town of Le Chambon-sur-Lignon, on the Plateau Vivarais-Lignon, in south-central France. In his preaching, he spoke out against discrimination as the Nazis were gaining power in neighboring Germany. During World War II, he urged his Christian congregation to hide Jewish refugees from the Holocaust as well as other individuals persecuted by the Nazi regime. He, his wife Magda and his assistant, Pastor Edouard Theis, led the people of Le Chambon-sur-Lignon and surrounding villages in providing refuge for an estimated 5,000 people.

== Early life ==
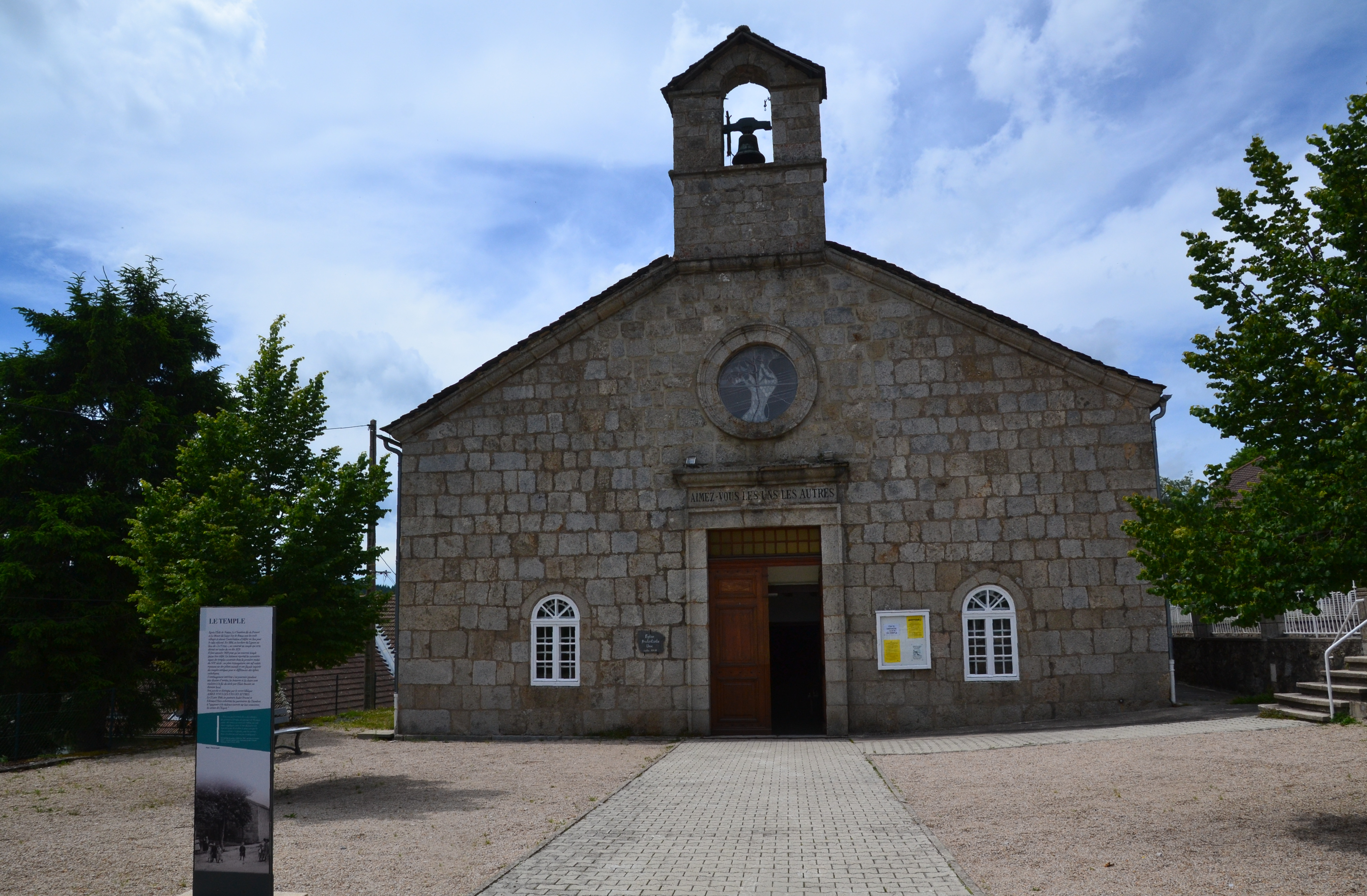
The Reformed church in Le Chambon-sur-Lignon

André Trocmé was born in Saint-Quentin-en-Tourmont to a large and prosperous upper-middle class and Protestant family. His family was split between his mother's German heritage and his half-French brothers. His mother, Pauline Schwerdtmenn, died when Trocmé was ten due to an automobile accident, leaving him to be raised by his distant but demanding father. André's father, Paul Trocmé, was a wealthy curtain manufacturer. His upbringing was sheltered and strict, but he faced reality when the First World War reached his hometown. Trocmé was thirteen as he watched soldiers struggle through the streets after battle. In 1916, he saw the trains carrying the bodies of soldiers to the crematoriums of the South.

His views on pacifism came to fruition when he met a young soldier. They spoke a great deal, and the young soldier told him about the ideals of non-violence, influencing Trocmé greatly. The young soldier was killed in battle later on, and Trocmé took pacifism more seriously.

When his hometown was bombed by the Germans in 1917, he and his family were evacuated to southern Belgium as refugees. This gave Trocmé an understanding of what it meant to be poor, in contrast to the wealthy life he had been accustomed to.

== Studies in theology ==
The Trocmé family moved to Paris shortly after the end of the First World War where he began studying at the Faculty of Protestant Theology as well as at Sorbonne. Trocmé's convictions of nonviolence and Christian socialism were deepened here as he studied the Bible. He met many students like himself, including Edouard Theis, who later joined Trocmé in Le Chambon. Trocmé's studies were interrupted due to mandatory military service (1921–1923), which Trocmé did not oppose because he wanted to experience the service time in Morocco. Upon returning from the military, he joined the French wing of the International Fellowship of Reconciliation along with several of his friends from university. In 1925 he was offered a one-year bursary designated for young French theologians by the Union Theological Seminary in New York. It was there that Trocmé worked as a tutor for the children of John D. Rockefeller Jr. as a way to pay for his expenses abroad.

It was also in New York that Trocmé met Magda Grilli, a Russian-Italian woman who had come to the city to learn social work and escape the confines of her home. Magda Elisa Larissa Grilli di Cortona was born on November 2, 1901, in Florence, Italy. Her father was an Italian born of Florentine nobility and was distant to Magda due to the death of his wife ( Magda's mother) who had died shortly after giving birth to her. Magda's new step-mother had attempted to put Magda into a Catholic school while in elementary school, but Magda could not outwardly conform. Magda preferred to make up her own mind rather than follow the "ready-made" opinions of others. Even marrying a Protestant pastor did not change her skepticism of religion. From a young age, Magda was interested in social work. In 1925, Magda attended the New York School of Social Work at Columbia University by scholarship. André Trocmé married Magda Grilli in 1926. They had four children: Nelly, Jean-Pierre, Jacques, and Daniel.

Trocmé's first post as a pastor brought him and his family back to Europe, to Maubeuge in northern France, a town destroyed by the Great War. Conscientious objection was a forbidden matter among pastors, though this did not stop Trocmé from supporting those of the town who refused conscription. This reflected Trocmé's pacifism, which was not highly regarded in the Protestant faith. The family stayed here for seven years, but by 1932 the dusty, polluted air began to take a toll on them. While in search of a new parish, Trocmé was turned down by the first two he had applied to. The third, Le Chambon, was more open to pacifists and admired his great faith.

== World War II ==
When France was overrun by Nazi Germany in 1940, the mission to resist the Nazis became increasingly important to Trocmé. Believing in the same ideas as former Pastor Charles Guillon, André and Magda Trocmé became involved in a network organizing the rescue of Jews fleeing the deportation efforts of the Nazi implementation of their Final Solution. Following the establishment of the Vichy France regime, Trocmé and ministers serving other parishes encouraged their congregations to shelter "the people of the Bible" and for their cities to be a "city of refuge." Trocmé was a catalyst whose efforts led to Le Chambon and surrounding villages becoming a unique haven in Nazi-occupied France.

Trocmé and his church members helped their town develop ways of resisting the dominant force they faced. Together they established first one, and then a number of "safe houses" where Jewish and other refugees seeking to escape the Nazis could hide. These houses received contributions from the Quakers, the Salvation Army, the American Congregational Church, the pacifist movement Fellowship of Reconciliation, Jewish and Christian ecumenical groups, the French Protestant student organization Cimade and the Swiss organization Help to Children in order to house and buy food supplies for the fleeing refugees. Many refugees were helped to escape to Switzerland following an underground railroad network. Families were located who were willing to accommodate Jewish refugees; members of the community reported to the railroad station to gather the arriving refugees, and the town's schools were prepared for the increased enrollment of new children, often under false names. Many village families and numerous farm families also took in children whose parents had been shipped to concentration camps in Germany.

Trocmé refused to accept the deindividualization and dehumanization of Jews by those in power. "We do not know what a Jew is. We only know men", he said when asked by the Vichy authorities to produce a list of the Jews in the town. Between 1940 and 1945, when World War II ended in Europe, it is now documented by researcher Muriel Rosenberg in her 2021 book Mais combien étaient-ils? that at least 2,000 Jewish refugees, including many children, were saved by the small village of Le Chambon and the communities on the surrounding plateau because the people refused to give in to what they considered to be the illegitimate legal, military and police power of the Nazis. (Earlier unsubstantiated estimates were 3,000 to 5,000 refugees were saved.)

These activities eventually came to the attention of the anti-Jewish Vichy regime. Authorities and 'security agents' were sent to perform searches within the town, most of which were unsuccessful. One arrest by the Gestapo, however, led to the death of several young Jewish men in deportation camps. In addition, the director of their residence La Maison des Roches, Daniel Trocmé, who was André's second cousin, refused to let the young adults in his care to be sent away without him. He was subsequently arrested and later murdered in the Majdanek concentration camp. When Georges Lamirand, a minister in the Vichy government, made an official visit to Le Chambon on August 15, 1942, Trocmé expressed his opinions to him. Days later, the Vichy gendarmes were sent into the town to locate "illegal" aliens. Amidst rumors that Trocmé was soon to be arrested, he urged his parishioners to "do the will of God, not of men". The gendarmes were unsuccessful and left the town.

In February 1943, André Trocmé was arrested along with Edouard Theis and the public school headmaster Roger Darcissac. Sent to Saint-Paul d'Eyjeaux, a French internment camp near Limoges, they were released after four weeks and pressed to sign a commitment to obey all government orders. Trocmé and Theis refused but were nevertheless released. They went underground where Trocmé was still able to keep the rescue and sanctuary efforts running smoothly with the help of many friends and collaborators.

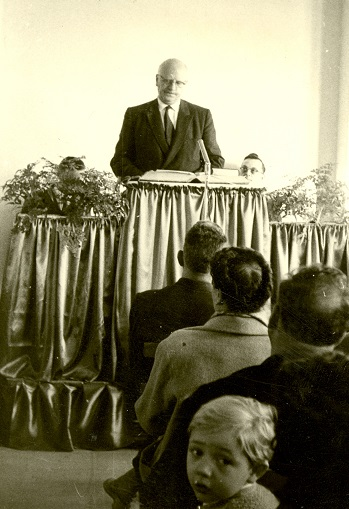
André Trocmé speaking in 1958 as co-secretary of the International Fellowship of Reconciliation

After the war, André Trocmé and his wife Magda served as co-secretaries for the International Fellowship of Reconciliation, Europe. During the Algerian War, André and Magda set up the group Eirene in Morocco, with the aid of the Mennonites, to help French conscientious objectors. They also advocated for the independence of Algeria from France, and demonstrated against the development of nuclear armaments in France. André and Magda were signatories of the agreement to convene a convention for drafting a world constitution. In 1968, a World Constituent Assembly convened to draft and adopt the Constitution for the Federation of Earth.

André spent his final years as a pastor of the Reformed Church in Geneva, where he died. Magda died in Paris. André and Magda are buried in Le Chambon-sur-Lignon.

== Legacy ==
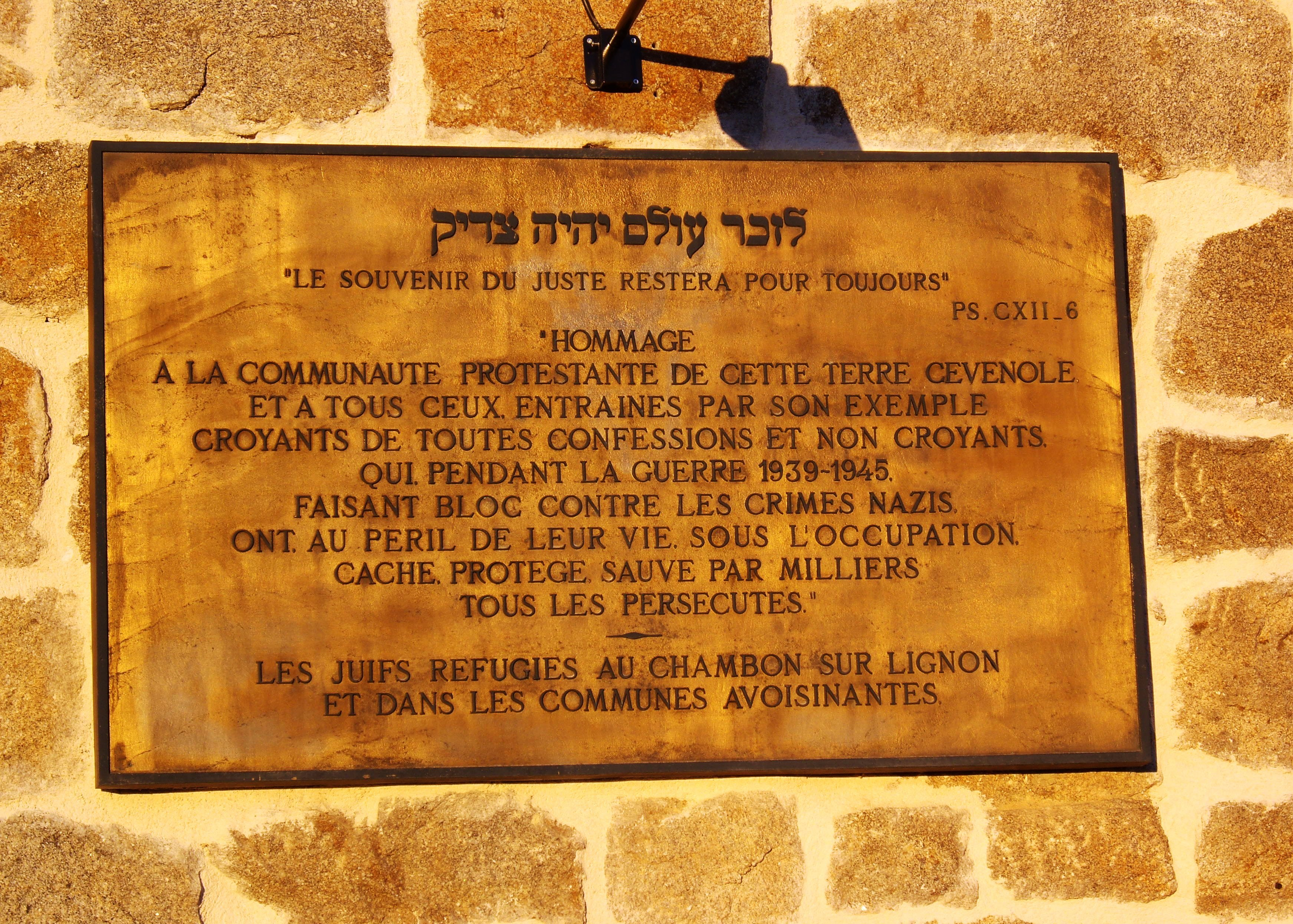
Plaque commemorating the Trocmé's rescue of the Jews in Le Chambon-sur-Lignon

In January 1971, the Holocaust memorial center in Israel, Yad Vashem, recognized André Trocmé as Righteous among the Nations. He died later that year in Geneva. In July 1986, Magda was also recognized. Several years later, Yad Vashem honored the village of Le Chambon-sur-Lignon and the neighboring communities with an engraved stele erected in its memorial park.

André was the second cousin of Daniel Trocmé, who was involved in similar activities to rescue Jews from the Vichy government and died in the Majdanek concentration camp in April 1944. In March 1976, Yad Vashem likewise recognized Daniel as Righteous among the Nations.

Magda Trocmé was the guest of French radio program Les Chemins d'une Vie (Paths of a Life) recorded by Christian Lassalas for FR3 Auvergne Radio (April 1982 – 90 min).

The Vivarais-Lignon plateau and Le Chambon-sur-Lignon have become a symbol of the rescue of Jews in France during World War II.

As historians continue to examine events during the German occupation and Vichy rule, several longstanding disputes have emerged. In the case of the Vivarais-Lignon plateau and Le Chambon-sur-Lignon, they include whether the interpretations based on Trocmé's writings are complete or correct. Those issues are objectively addressed in Robert Paxton's Vichy France: Old Guard and New Order (1972) and in Patrick Henry's book, We Only Know Men: The Rescue of Jews in France During the Holocaust (2013). Meanwhile, Richard Unsworth's A Portrait of Pacifists: Le Chambon, the Holocaust, and the Lives of André and Magda Trocmé (2012) provides a thorough exploration of the roles and writings of the Trocmés. While Caroline Moorehead's Village of Secrets (2014) also examines the events on the Vivarais-Lignon plateau and in Le Chambon-sur-Lignon, other authors, historians and documentary filmmakers believe that that book presents a biased and inaccurate view of what took place.

== Books published in English ==
- Angels and Donkeys: Tales for Christmas and Other Times (Good Books, 1998)
- Jesus and the Nonviolent Revolution (Plough, 2003)
- The Memoirs of André Trocmé: The Pastor Who Rescued Jews (Plough, 2025)

== Relevant literature ==
- Hallie, Philip P (1979), Lest Innocent Blood Be Shed: The Story of Le Chambon and How Goodness Happened There, New York: Harper & Row, ISBN 0-06-011701-X.
- Lambert, Carole. Against Indifference: Four Christian Responses to Jewish Suffering during the Holocaust: C. S. Lewis, Thomas Merton, Dietrich Bonhoeffer, André and Magda Trocmé. New York: Peter Lang Publishing, 2015.
- Volf, Miroslav; Bass, Dorothy C. (2001), Practicing Theology: Beliefs and Practices in Christian Life, Grand Rapids, MI: Eerdmans, ISBN 978-0-8028-4931-1.
- Romain Gary Les Cerfs-volants, 1980 (translated as The Kites, 2017)
