= Daniel Trocmé =

Physics and biology teacher

Daniel Trocmé (1910- 1944) in Le Chambon-sur-Lignon, France. He taught physics, chemistry and natural sciences. He became the principal of a boarding school in 1941. Daniel Trocmé was sent to different detention camps until he died in 1944 from exhaustion and sickness. He was recognized as a Righteous Among the Nations for saving Jews in Le Chambon-sur-Lignon in France.

== Activity During WWII ==
Trocmé became the principal of a boarding school, La Maison des Roches, in 1941 in France, where he helped many Jewish refugee children, an act that was explicitly against the law, and fought for human rights. During the years 1941 to 1943 Daniel Trocmé and his cousin André Trocmé, managed to smuggle about 5,000 Jews through the village of Le Chambon-sur-Lignon and saved them from death.

In June 1943 Nazi troops broke into the school to search for Trocmé and his Jewish students. At that time, Trocmé wasn't present at school. Although he could have escaped, he chose to return to his Jewish students. Under threats, he was taken along with 18 of his students to be arrested. While he was being investigated, he continued to show courage and did everything to lift the spirits of his students. He claimed to the Nazis that he was just protecting the helpless. Daniel Trocmé was sent to different detention camps until he died in 1944 at Majdanek, aged 34, from exhaustion and sickness.

== Honors ==
On March 18, 1976, Yad Vashem recognized Daniel Trocmé as a Righteous Among the Nations.
