= Unexplained wealth order =

Type of British court order

An unexplained wealth order (UWO) is a type of court order that requires a person to prove that they acquired a valuable asset that does not appear commensurate with their known legal income. Unlike traditional legal processes where the government must prove guilt, a UWO places the burden of proof on the respondent. The owner must prove that the property subject to a UWO was acquired with legal funds. If the owner is unable to do so, the asset/s targeted by a UWO are deemed to be tainted and may be seized, usually by means of a separate legal procedure.

UWOs are currently included in the laws of Australia (Western Australia, New South Wales, and Queensland), Canada (British Columbia, Manitoba), Ireland and the United Kingdom. Kenya, Mauritius, and Colombia also have a civil recovery mechanism equivalent to a UWO in their law to combat illicit-enrichment and corrutpion.

In the UK, a UWO is issued by a British court to compel the target to reveal the sources of their unexplained wealth. UWOs were introduced by sections 1–2 of the Criminal Finances Act 2017 and are governed by sections 362A–362T of Part 8 of the Proceeds of Crime Act 2002. Persons who fail to account are liable to have assets seized after an enforcement authority, such as the National Crime Agency (NCA), makes a successful appeal to the High Court.

The power of UWOs in fighting money laundering lies in their reverse onus principle, however the orders are ineffective as soon as a defendant can provide an explanation for the source of their wealth. In the absence of evidence to the contrary, the defendant then wins the argument. Information obtained in the context of a UWO cannot be used in a criminal proceeding. The statutory and regulatory scheme for UWOs is set out in paragraphs 11–18 of Hajiyeva v National Crime Agency [2020] EWCA Civ 108 (05 February 2020).

== Cases in the UK ==
The first two Unexplained Wealth Orders were issued in 2018 to Zamira Hajiyeva, the wife of Jahangir Hajiyev, the former chairman of the International Bank of Azerbaijan. In February 2020, Hajiyeva lost her appeal against the NCA's bid to seize her London property. She was thus required to "provide the NCA with a full account of the sources of her wealth – including how she was able to buy her £15m home and the Mill Ride Golf Course in Berkshire".

In May 2019, the NCA secured three further UWOs as part of an investigation into "London property linked to a politically exposed person believed to be involved in serious crime". The three properties, originally bought for more than £80m and held by offshore companies, were subsequently identified in an investigation by BBC News, Finance Uncovered and Transparency International into the ownership of London property by members of Kazakhstan's political elite. Nurali Aliyev (Nursultan Nazarbayev's grandson) and his mother Dariga Nazarbayeva "have denied all wrongdoing – saying they can prove independent and legitimate wealth for their UK property investments". On 8 April 2020, the High Court of Justice subsequently ruled that the case against the two be dismissed and that the properties be unfrozen "after they spoke more candidly about the sources and scope of their wealth".

The first successful UWO was in October 2020 against Leeds businessman Mansoor Mahmood Hussain. Hussain, who had links to a convicted murderer, agreed to surrender 45 properties in his property empire to the NCA as well as other assets amounting to a total of almost £10 million.

As of July 2020, the NCA was the only body to have secured UWOs. The Serious Fraud Office, HM Revenue & Customs, Financial Conduct Authority and Crown Prosecution Service have authority but have so far not used the legislation. At the same time it was reported that UWO investigations into “politically exposed persons” had proved much more difficult than the UK authorities had expected.

British media sometimes refer to UWOs as "McMafia laws" after the McMafia crime drama series on British television and Misha Glenny's original book McMafia: A Journey Through the Global Criminal Underworld on organised crime.

== See also ==
- Connect (computer system)
- Interim freezing order
- Statement of Assets, Liabilities and Net worth – an annual document used to determine if government officials have unexplained wealth in the Philippines
