= R v Steyn =

South African legal case

R v Steyn (1954), an important case in South African criminal procedure, dealt with an application for leave to appeal against a judgment of the High Court of Southern Rhodesia, dismissing an appeal from a decision by a magistrate, in which he convicted the applicant of the crime of theft as defined by the Stock and Produce Theft Repression Act.

The court held that the basic rule was that the police docket and contents thereof were privileged and the defense is not entitled to access to it.

Therefore, when statements were procured from witnesses for the purpose that what they said would be given in evidence in a lawsuit that was contemplated, these statements were protected against disclosure until at least the conclusion of the proceedings, which would include any appeal or similar step after the decision in the court of first instance.

This protection against disclosure applied in both civil and criminal trials.

There was, however, an ethical rule which obliged the prosecutor to disclose if a witness deviated from his original statement.

Where there was a serious discrepancy between the proof of a Crown witness and what he said on oath at the trial, the prosecutor must direct attention to that fact and, unless there was special and cogent reason to the contrary, make the statement available for cross-examination.

This approach, which applied in South Africa before the advent of its new constitutional dispensation, has been described as "trial by ambush."

== Notes ==
- R v Steyn 1954 (1) SA 324 (A)
