= Criminal Finances Act 2017 =

Act of the Parliament of the United Kingdom

Criminal Finances Act 2017 (Note: Section 59.)
- Act of Parliament
- Parliament of the United Kingdom
- Long title: An Act to amend the Proceeds of Crime Act 2002; make provision in connection with terrorist property; create corporate offences for cases where a person associated with a body corporate or partnership facilitates the commission by another person of a tax evasion offence; and for connected purposes.
- Citation: 2017 c. 22
- Introduced by: Amber Rudd, Home Secretary (Commons); Susan Williams, Baroness Williams of Trafford (Lords)
- Territorial extent: England and Wales; Scotland; Northern Ireland; (Note: Section 57.)

Dates
- Royal assent: 27 April 2017
- Commencement: Various (Note: Section 58.)
Other legislation
Amends	Prescription and Limitation (Scotland) Act 1973; Limitation Act 1980; Civil Jurisdiction and Judgments Act 1982; Criminal Justice Act 1987; Limitation (Northern Ireland) Order 1989; Data Protection Act 1998; Criminal Procedure (Scotland) Act 1995; Terrorism Act 2000; Anti-terrorism, Crime and Security Act 2001; Proceeds of Crime Act 2002; Serious Organised Crime and Police Act 2005; Crime and Courts Act 2013
Amended by	Law Enforcement and Security (Amendment) (EU Exit) Regulations 2019

Status: Amended

History of passage through Parliament

Text of statute as originally enacted

Revised text of statute as amended

The Criminal Finances Act 2017 (c. 22) is an act of the Parliament of the United Kingdom that amends the Proceeds of Crime Act 2002 to expand the provisions for confiscating funds to deal with terrorist property and proceeds of tax evasion.

The act received Royal Assent on 27 April 2017. According to its long title, the purpose of the Act is to:

amend the Proceeds of Crime Act 2002; make provision in connection with terrorist property; create corporate offences for cases where a person associated with a body corporate or partnership facilitates the commission by another person of a tax evasion offence; and for connected purposes.

Part 3 of the Act creates the corporate offences of failure of a company or partnership to prevent facilitation of UK tax evasion and failure to prevent facilitation of foreign tax evasion offences. Technically these are two distinct offences, depending on whether the tax which is evaded is UK taxation or foreign taxation. Companies and partnerships are required to take 'reasonable' action to prevent the facilitation of tax evasion and His Majesty's Revenue and Customs (HMRC), who are responsible for implementation of the legislation, argues that "the procedures that are considered reasonable will change as time passes".

Hong Kong-based law firm, King & Wood Mallesons, has described the Act as "a highly effective piece of legislation".

== Provisions ==
The act introduced unexplained wealth orders, which allow the Serious Fraud Office, HM Revenue and Customs and other agencies to apply to the High Court for an order forcing the owner of an asset to explain how they obtained the funds necessary to purchase it. The act introduced corporate criminal offences which reduced the bar for prosecuting businesses that enabled tax evasion.

== Applications ==
The act was invoked, less than two weeks after its provisions on "unexplained wealth orders" came into force on 31 January 2018, to freeze £22 million of assets belonging to an unnamed oligarch.

As of 2024, there had been no corporate criminal offence prosecutions under the act.
