= Narcotic Control Act =

Canadian federal act

Parliament of Canada
- Commenced: 1961
- Repealed: 1996

Repealed by
- Controlled Drugs and Substances Act
- Status: Repealed

The Narcotic Control Act (French: Loi sur les stupéfiants), passed in 1961, was one of Canada's national drug control statutes prior to its repeal by the 1996 Controlled Drugs and Substances Act. It implemented the provisions of the Single Convention on Narcotic Drugs.

== Provisions ==
The "narcotics" included in the Act are drugs such as heroin, cocaine and cannabis. The Act prohibits activities such as possession of a "narcotic", possession for the purpose of trafficking, cultivating, importing or exporting.

Section 3 of the Act prohibits the possession of the "narcotic". A person is authorized to have a narcotic in his or her possession if he or she requires the narcotic for his business or profession and is a licensed dealer, a pharmacist, or a practitioner who is registered and entitled to practice in the province in which he has such possession. The maximum penalty for possession of narcotics is 7 years' imprisonment.

Section 4 of the Act prohibits the trafficking of a narcotic or the possession of a narcotic for the purpose of trafficking. Section 2 of the Act defines "traffic" as (a) to manufacture, sell, give, administer, transport, send, deliver or distribute, or (b) to offer to do anything referred to in part (a). The maximum penalty for the offense of trafficking is life imprisonment.

Section 5 of the Act prohibits importing or exporting narcotics. This offence has a maximum penalty of life imprisonment. The minimum penalty of importing or exporting narcotics is 7 years' imprisonment. Section 6 of the Act prohibits the growing of opium or marijuana without a federal licence. The penalty for the offence is a maximum of 7 years in prison.

== Revision of the Act ==
In February 1994, Bill C-7 proposed a revision of illegal drug legislation. The new drug legislating aimed to be more coherent and consistent with Canada's obligations under the United Nations Convention Against Illicit Traffic in Narcotic Drugs and Psychotropic Substances signed in 1988.

Failing to succeed, the bill was reintroduced in the House of Commons on March 6, 1996, as Bill C-8. The House of Commons referred Bill C-8 to the Canadian Senate Standing Committee on Legal and Constitutional Affairs, which conducted a detailed study of it. The Senate Committee on Legal and Constitutional Affairs proposed 15 amendments as well as the striking of a joint parliamentary committee of the House of Commons and the Senate, which would review Canada's drug policy. Bill C-8 was passed and received Royal Assent on June 20, 1996, and is thus Canada's current illegal drug legislation, known as Canada's Controlled Drugs and Substances Act.
