= Le Chambon-sur-Lignon =

Le Chambon-sur-Lignon Lo Chambon (Occitan)
- Commune
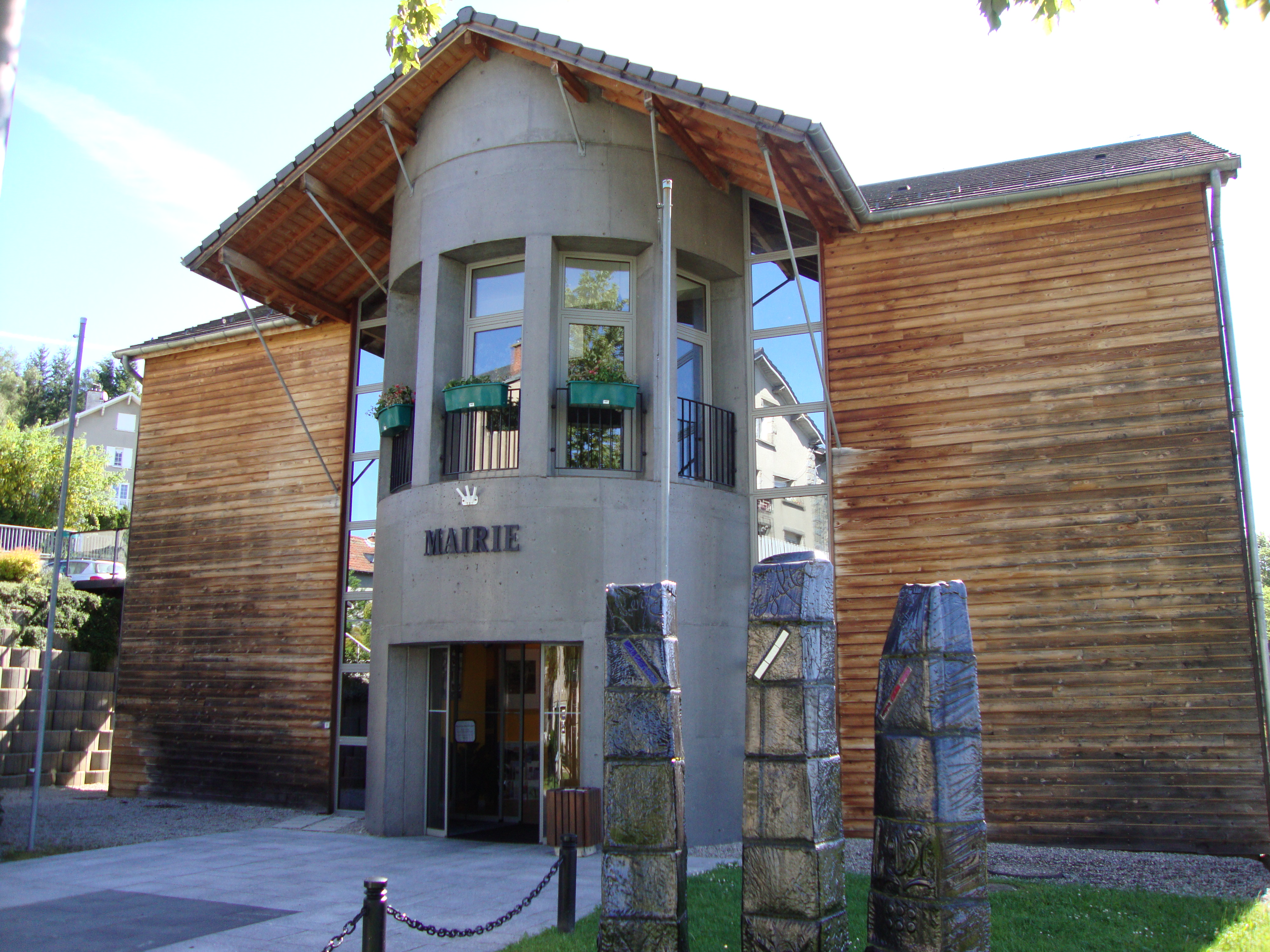
- Town hall

- Coat of arms
- Location of Le Chambon-sur-Lignon
- Location within France Location within Auvergne-Rhône-Alpes
- Coordinates: 45°03′42″N 4°18′11″E
- Country: France
- Region: Auvergne-Rhône-Alpes
- Department: Haute-Loire
- Arrondissement: Yssingeaux
- Canton: Mézenc

Government
  - Mayor (2020–2026): Jean-Michel Eyraud
- Area^{1}: 41.71 km^{2} (16.10 sq mi)
- Elevation: 1,000 m (3,300 ft)
- Highest elevation: 1,139 m (3,737 ft)
- Lowest elevation: 874 m (2,867 ft)
- Population (2023): 2,501
  - Density: 59.96/km^{2} (155.3/sq mi)
- Time zone: UTC+01:00 (CET)
  - Summer (DST): UTC+02:00 (CEST)
- INSEE/Postal code: 43051 /43400
- ^{1} French Land Register data, which excludes lakes, ponds, glaciers > 1 km^{2} (0.386 sq mi or 247 acres) and river estuaries.

Le Chambon-sur-Lignon (Note: French pronunciation: [lə ʃɑ̃bɔ̃ syʁ liɲɔ̃], literally "Le Chambon on Lignon"; Auvergnat: Lo Chambon) is a commune in the Haute-Loire department in south-central France.

Residents have been primarily Huguenot or Protestant since the 17th century. During World War II these Huguenot residents made the commune a haven for Jews and other refugees fleeing from Nazi Germany and countries controlled by Nazi Germany. The refugees were hidden both within the town and in the countryside or were helped to flee to neutral Switzerland. Humanitarian organizations, both Jewish and non-Jewish, and local religious leaders had a priority of hiding children to protect them from deportation to Nazi concentration camps. Estimates of the number of people sheltered in Chambon and its area range from 800 to 5,000. In 1990 the town was one of two collectively honoured as the Righteous Among the Nations by Yad Vashem in Israel for saving Jews in Nazi-occupied Europe. The other awardee was the Dutch village of Nieuwlande.

== Geography ==
Le Chambon-sur-Lignon is located on the Vivaris-Lignon plateau in the highland Massif Central of southern France. The town lies in the middle of the commune, on the right bank of the Lignon du Velay River, which flows north-northwestward through the commune and forms part of its northwestern border. Le Chambon is one of the three largest villages of seventeen on the plateau. The region has traditionally been isolated with a population of mostly farmers who raised cattle and sheep.

=== Climate ===
Le Chambon-sur-Lignon has a Cfb climate (Mild temperate humid, warm summers, cool winters) by the Köppen climate classification system. The altitude of almost 1,000 m (3,300 ft) results in cooler summers and colder winters than in most places of similar latitudes in France.

Climate data for Le Chambon-sur-Lignon, France
Month	Jan	Feb	Mar	Apr	May	Jun	Jul	Aug	Sep	Oct	Nov	Dec	Year
Mean daily maximum °C (°F)	3.5 (38.3)	4.3 (39.7)	8.4 (47.1)	11.7 (53.1)	15.5 (59.9)	20.2 (68.4)	22.3 (72.1)	22.0 (71.6)	17.9 (64.2)	13.6 (56.5)	7.4 (45.3)	4.5 (40.1)	13.7 (56.7)
Daily mean °C (°F)	0.5 (32.9)	0.5 (32.9)	4.1 (39.4)	7.3 (45.1)	11.1 (52.0)	15.5 (59.9)	17.5 (63.5)	17.2 (63.0)	13.4 (56.1)	9.8 (49.6)	4.4 (39.9)	1.5 (34.7)	8.6 (47.4)
Mean daily minimum °C (°F)	−2.2 (28.0)	−2.7 (27.1)	0.2 (32.4)	2.9 (37.2)	6.7 (44.1)	10.6 (51.1)	12.6 (54.7)	12.5 (54.5)	9.3 (48.7)	6.4 (43.5)	1.6 (34.9)	−1.1 (30.0)	4.7 (40.5)
Average precipitation mm (inches)	81 (3.2)	63 (2.5)	68 (2.7)	106 (4.2)	117 (4.6)	95 (3.7)	86 (3.4)	90 (3.5)	109 (4.3)	125 (4.9)	125 (4.9)	79 (3.1)	1,144 (45)

== Early history ==
In the 16th century, Chambon was a refuge for French Protestants (Huguenots) who fled persecution by Roman Catholics, by taking refuge in the remote Massif Central. Chambon and its region, still called the "Protestant Mountain", continues to have mostly Protestant residents.

Tourism became important to the economy in the late 19th century. Among the tourists were children brought to Chambon from polluted industrial cities for their health and wealthy Protestants who built summer homes. By the 1940s, the population of Chambon was "900 in the winter, 6,000 in the summer, and 4,000 in September." The influx of tourists resulted in the establishment of 42 hotels, 50 pensions, and 12 youth hostels in the region, most of them in the village of Chambon. Tourism declined during World War II and the existence of these unused facilities, the familiarity of the residents with outsiders, and the town's history as a refuge against repression contributed to the welcome Chambon and its region gave refugees.

== World War II refugees ==
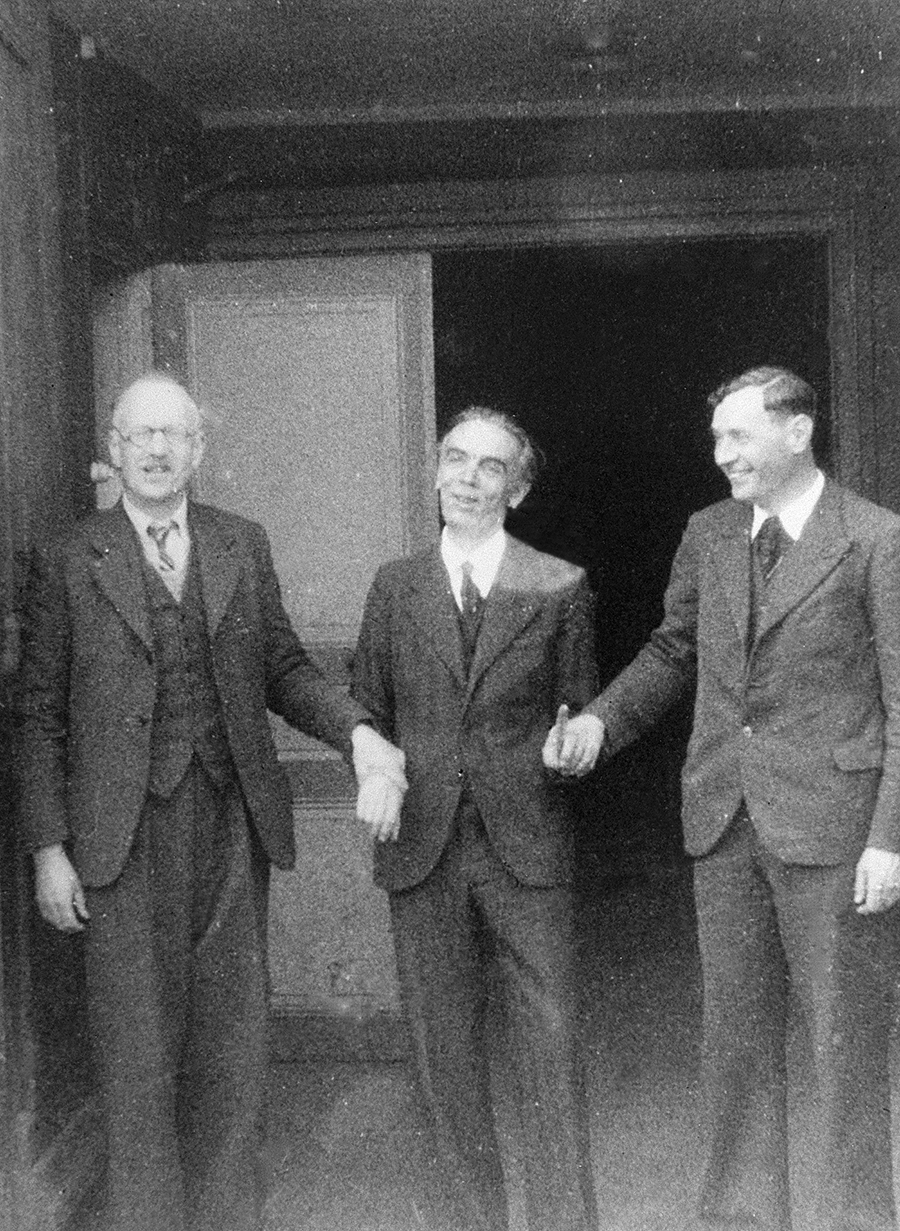
Trocmé, Darcissac, and Theis (1943)

The influx of refugees into Chambon and the Haute Loire department began in the 1930s with the coming of power of the Nazis in Germany in 1933 and the defeat of the Republicans in the Spanish Civil War in 1939. Chambon was not especially welcoming to these first refugees. In 1939, Spanish refugees were asked to leave at the beginning of tourist season and in 1940 anti-Nazi refugees, mostly Jews, were interned in a camp near Chambon before being sent to the Gurs internment camp as "undesirable" aliens in October. Poor conditions, including starvation, for people confined in the internment camps scattered around southern France led humanitarian organizations involved in aid to the internees to establish a priority of keeping people out of the internment camps and getting children out of the internment camps, even though that policy could result in separation of children from their parents. In August 1942 when the first deportations of Jews from southern (Vichy) France to Germany took place the magnitude of the threat to the lives of Jews became apparent.

Jews were the most numerous of the refugees in Chambon during World War II but the town also sheltered anti-Nazi Germans and people active in the French Resistance to the German occupation or avoiding compulsory labor service, the Service du travail obligatoire, imposed on France by Germany. Whole families from cities such as Nice and Lyon sought shelter in Chambon. Many of the refugees continued onward from Chambon to safety in neutral Switzerland, assisted by the former mayor of Chambon, Charles Guillon.

Several persons were prominent as participants in Chambon's shelter of Jews and anti-Nazi refugees: Protestant pastors and pacifists André Trocmé and Eduoard Theis; Charles Guillon; and schoolteacher Roger Darcissac who forged documents for Jews to conceal their identities. Schoolteacher Daniel Trocmé, cousin of André, died in a German concentration camp. All 13 Protestant pastors in Chambon participated in the rescue efforts.

The Chambon region attracted the attention of French and international humanitarian organizations operating in Vichy France. Among the organizations involved were Cimade, a French youth organization, the Jewish OSE, the Swiss Red Cross, the American Friends Service Committee (Quakers), and the European Student Relief Fund, represented by an American, Tracy Strong, Jr. The Vichy French, although collaborators with the Germans, were initially amendable to releasing children from the overcrowded camps to live in children's homes.

In late 1940, André Trocmé met with Burns Chalmers who worked for the Quaker AFSC, in Marseille. Chalmers and Trocmé agreed to establish homes for refugee children utilizing the now-vacant tourist hotels in Chambon. Chalmers offered financial support for the venture. One of the advantages of Chambon as a refuge was the abundance of food as compared to the scarcity in other parts of France. In May 1941, the Swiss established the first children's home in Chambon. Seven children's homes housing 240 children were established by the end of 1942. Former mayor Charles Guillon was well-connected and helped Strong and the YMCA open one of the children's home at the Maison des Roches in October 1941. Eighty-six children, at least 46 of whom were Jews, were housed at Maison des Roches for varying periods of time.

In late summer 1942, Vichy Minister of Youth Georges Lamirand visited Chambon. A delegation of thirty students and two pastors told Lamirand that they would resist any attempt "to molest the Jewish guests in our village." The first French police raid on Chambon to arrest Jews began on August 26 and lasted three weeks. Twenty-one Jewish students successfully hid in the countryside until the police departed three weeks later. Many of the students made their way to safety in Switzerland. The only successful raid came on June 29, 1943 when fifty German police raided a children's home in Chambon and arrested 25 students, 20 of them Jewish, and teacher Daniel Trocmé. Few of those arrested survived the war. Most of the time the French authorities and the German commander in the region chose to ignore the existence of Jewish refugees and anti-Nazi resistors in Chambon. The German army commander was well aware of the presence of the Jews and other refugees. The Germans commandeered three hotels in Chambon for convalescence of their wounded and ill soldiers.

While the children's homes received the attention of the humanitarian organizations, many refugee children and families were integrated into the general population and lived with local farmers who made up 70 percent of the region's population. Historians have focused on the children's homes, but encountered silence about other rescue activities. A teacher said, "Nobody talked about what was going on in Le Chambon...I did not know at all that a colleague with a strong accent who taught Latin and Greek was a rabbi" A pastor said, "we never really discussed refugees...we also never told parishioners that they were hosting Jews, who had become 'non-Jews' with their new identification papers...if they were hiding someone and were caught, they could always sincerely say, 'I did not know he was Jewish.'"

Because of the secrecy involved, estimates of the number of Jews rescued in the Chambon region vary widely up to 5,000, counting those who passed through, resided temporarily, or continued onwards to Switzerland. Eight hundred to one thousand is a common estimate of Jews sheltered throughout the war in Chambon.

== Present day ==
The ethos and practice of sheltering refugees continues, with migrants coming from many war zones, including Congo, Libya, Rwanda, South Sudan, Kosovo and Chechnya.

In 2021 the commune was bequeathed around €2m by Eric Schwam who was hidden in a school in 1943 and remained until 1950.

== Population ==
Historical population

Year	Pop.	±% p.a.
1793	1,730	—
1821	1,740	+0.02%
1846	2,280	+1.09%
1872	2,155	−0.22%
1901	2,670	+0.74%
1926	2,593	−0.12%
1946	3,202	+1.06%
1962	3,096	−0.21%
1968	2,846	−1.39%

Year	Pop.	±% p.a.
1975	2,811	−0.18%
1982	2,791	−0.10%
1990	2,854	+0.28%
1999	2,642	−0.85%
2007	2,662	+0.09%
2012	2,609	−0.40%
2017	2,470	−1.09%
2023	2,501	+0.21%

Source: EHESS and INSEE (1968-2023)

== Honors ==
- In 1981 the entire town was awarded an honorary degree by Haverford College in Pennsylvania in recognition of its humanitarian efforts.
- In 1982, documentary filmmaker Pierre Sauvage – who was born and sheltered in Le Chambon – returned there to film Weapons of the Spirit (1989).
- In 1990, for risking their lives to rescue Jews, the entire town was recognized as "Righteous Among the Nations". A small garden and plaque on the grounds of the Yad Vashem memorial to the Holocaust in Israel was dedicated to the people of Chambon-sur-Lignon.
- In 2004 French President Jacques Chirac officially recognized the heroism of the town.
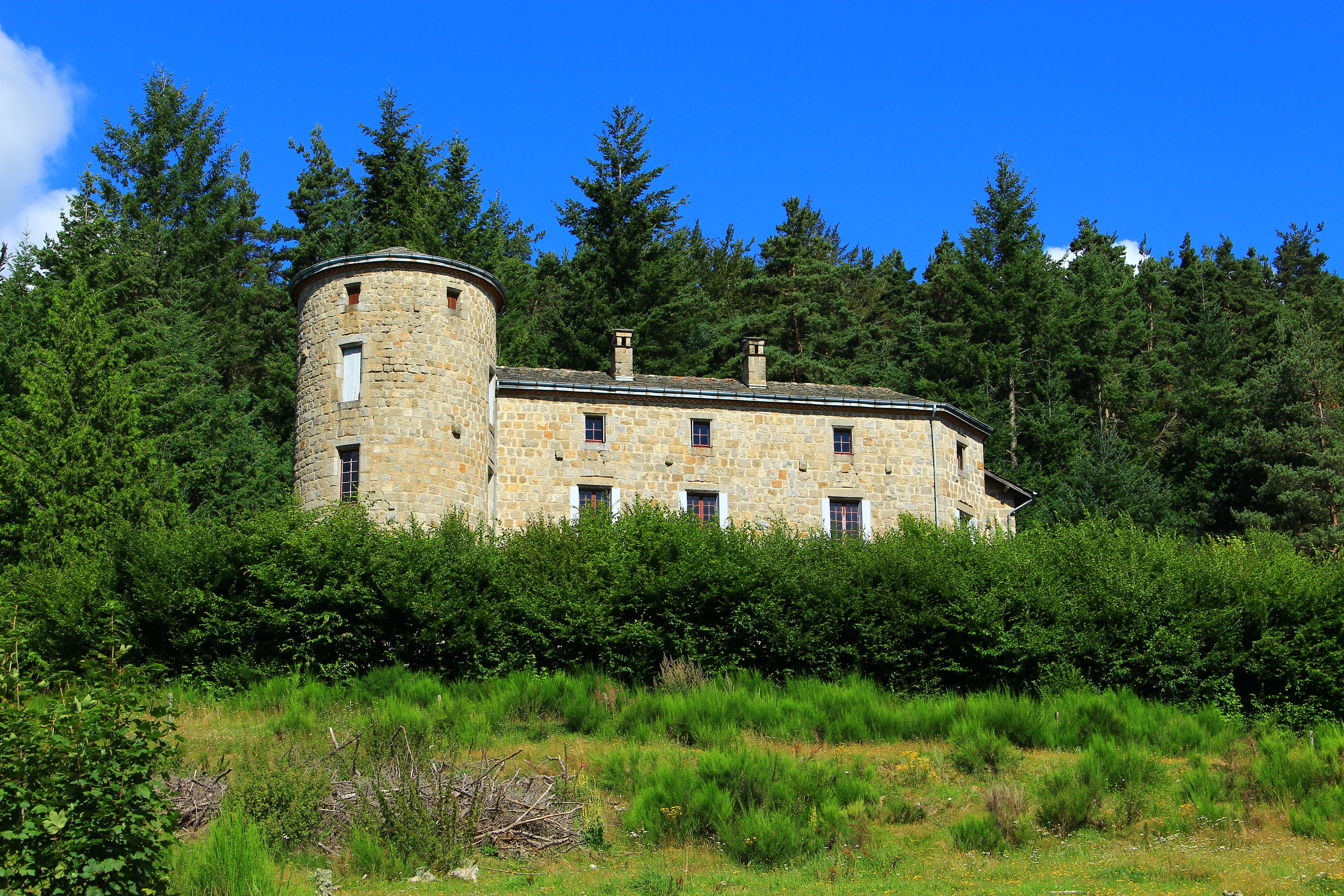
- The Pont-de-Mars Castle in Le Chambon-sur-Lignon
  In January 2007 they were honoured along with the other French Righteous Among the Nations in a ceremony at the Panthéon in Paris.

Eric Schwam, an Austrian man who fled the Nazis with his family during the Second World War and found refuge in the village, bequeathed approximately €2 million for the village.

== Education ==
The town of Chambon-sur-Lignon was home to Le Collège-Lycée Cévenol International, a private boarding school founded in 1938 by local Protestant ministers André Trocmé and Edouard Theis. The school closed its doors in 2014 due to financial troubles and declining enrollment, three years after the rape and murder of a 14-year-old student.

== Personalities ==
Alexander Grothendieck, a central figure of 20th-century mathematics, was among the Jewish children sheltered during the war.

The paternal grandfather of actor Timothée Chalamet was from the town.

== Popular culture ==
Canadian writer Malcolm Gladwell uses Chambon-sur-Lignon in his book David and Goliath as an example of how the rebellious origin of its people influenced their actions when protecting Jewish people during the Second World War. The town also appears in the last book French author Romain Gary published before his death, The Kites, and recounts the bravery of its inhabitants in the face of danger. In R.J. Palacio's White Bird, Le Chambon-sur-Lignon is the inspiration for the fictional town of Aubervilliers-aux-Bois. There is another true historic book by American author, professor and philosopher Philip Hallie titled “Lest Innocent Blood Be Shed” which is commonly read in college courses and also narrates the heroics of Humanist Pastor Trocmé and their town in the efforts to save hundreds of Jews.

== Twin towns ==
- Fislisbach, Switzerland
- Meitar, Israel - since November 9, 2006

== See also ==
- Communes of the Haute-Loire department
