= Presumption of innocence =

Legal principle that one is presumed innocent until proven guilty

The presumption of innocence is a legal principle that every person accused of any crime is considered innocent until proven guilty. Under the presumption of innocence, the legal burden of proof is thus on the prosecution, which must present compelling evidence to the trier of fact (a judge or a jury). If the prosecution does not prove the charges true, then the person is acquitted of the charges. The prosecution must in most cases prove that the accused is guilty beyond a reasonable doubt. If reasonable doubt remains, the accused must be acquitted. The opposite system is a presumption of guilt.

In many countries and under many legal systems, including common law and civil law systems (not to be confused with the other kind of civil law, which deals with non-criminal legal issues), the presumption of innocence is a legal right of the accused in a criminal trial. It is also an international human right under the UN's Universal Declaration of Human Rights, Article 11.

== History ==
=== Roman law ===
The sixth-century Digest of Justinian (22.3.2) provides, as a general rule of evidence: Ei incumbit probatio qui dicit, non qui negat—"Proof lies on him who asserts, not on him who denies". It is there attributed to the second and third century jurist Julius Paulus. It was introduced in Roman criminal law by emperor Antoninus Pius.

A civil law system is a modern legal system derived from the ancient Roman legal system (as opposed to the English common law system). The maxim and its equivalents have been adopted by many countries that use a civil law system, including Brazil, China, France, Italy, Philippines, Poland, Romania and Spain.

=== Talmudical law ===
According to Talmud, "every man is innocent until proved guilty. Hence, the infliction of unusual rigours on the accused must be delayed until his innocence has been successfully challenged. Thus, in the early stages of the trial, arguments in his defence are as elaborate as with any other man on trial. Only when his guilt has become apparent were the solicitous provisions that had been made to protect defendants waived".

=== Islamic law ===
The presumption of innocence is fundamental to Islamic law where the principle that the onus of proof is on the accuser or claimant is strongly held, based on a hadith documented by Imam Nawawi. "Suspicion" is also highly condemned, this also from a hadith documented by Imam Nawawi as well as Imam Bukhari and Imam Muslim.

After the time of Muhammad, the fourth Caliph Ali ibn Abi Talib has also been cited to say, "Avert the prescribed punishment by rejecting doubtful evidence."

=== Medieval European law ===
After the collapse of the Western Roman Empire, the West began to practice feudal law, which was a synthesis of aspects of Roman law as well as some Germanic customs according to the new elite, including presumed guilt. For instance, the accused could prove his innocence by having twelve people swear that he could not have done what he was accused of. In practice, this tended to favor the nobility over the lower classes, whose witnesses risked being seen as less credible.

Trials by ordeal were common from the 6th century until the early 13th century, and were known to continue into the 17th century in the form of witch-hunts. Whilst common in early Germanic law, compurgation was formally adopted in Rome by Pope Innocent III in 1215 at the Fourth Lateran Council and trials by fire and water specifically were forbidden. This was during the period of development of the jus commune, the canon law of the Catholic Church influenced the common law during the medieval period.

In the early 13th century, Louis IX of France, better known as Saint Louis, banned all trials by ordeal and introduced the presumption of innocence to criminal procedures. This did not last for long and the institutional use of torture, called "question préalable" and subdivided into "question ordinaire" (light torture) and "question extraordinaire" (severe torture), applied at the judge's discretion against individuals suspected of a crime, was to last up to the eve of the French Revolution.

== Meaning ==
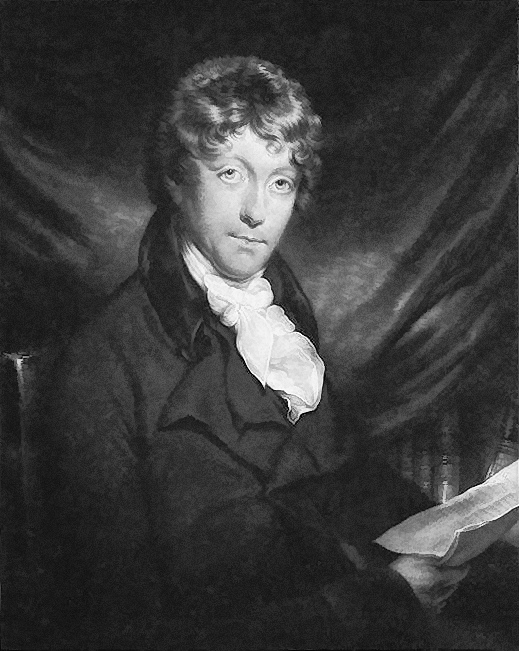
Sir William Garrow coined the phrase "presumed innocent until proven guilty", insisting that defendants' accusers and their evidence be thoroughly tested in court.

"Presumption of innocence" serves to emphasize that the prosecution has the obligation to prove each element of the offense beyond a reasonable doubt (or some other level of proof depending on the criminal justice system) and that the accused bears no burden of proof. This is often expressed in the phrase "presumed innocent until proven guilty", coined by the British barrister Sir William Garrow (1760–1840) during a 1791 trial at the Old Bailey. Garrow insisted that accusers be robustly tested in court. An objective observer in the position of the juror must reasonably conclude that the defendant almost certainly committed the crime. In 1935, in its judgment of Woolmington v Director of Public Prosecutions, the English Court of Appeal would later describe this concept as being 'the golden thread' running through the web of English criminal law. Garrow's statement was the first formal articulation of this.

The presumption of innocence was originally expressed by the French cardinal and canonical jurist Jean Lemoine in the phrase "item quilbet presumitur innocens nisi probetur nocens (a person is presumed innocent until proven guilty)", based on the legal inference that most people are not criminals. This referred not merely to the fact that the burden of proof rests on the prosecution in a criminal case, but the protections which a defendant should be given: prior notice of the accusation being made against them, the right of confrontation, right to counsel, etc. It is literally considered favorable evidence for the accused that automatically attaches at trial. It requires that the trier of fact, be it a juror or judge, begin with the presumption that the state is unable to support its assertion. To ensure this legal protection is maintained, a set of three related rules govern the procedure of criminal trials. The presumption means:

1. With respect to the critical facts of the case—whether the crime charged was committed and whether the defendant was the person who committed the crime—the state has the entire burden of proof.
2. With respect to the critical facts of the case, the defendant does not have any burden of proof whatsoever. The defendant does not have to testify, call witnesses or present any other evidence, and if the defendant elects not to testify or present evidence, this decision cannot be used against them.
3. The jury or judge is not to draw any negative inferences from the fact the defendant has been charged with a crime and is present in court and represented by an attorney. They must decide the case solely on evidence presented during the trial.

Blackstone's ratio as expressed by the English jurist William Blackstone in his seminal work Commentaries on the Laws of England, published in the 1760s, is the ratio between the error of impunity and error of wrongful convictions.

This duty on the prosecution was famously referred to as the "golden thread" in the criminal law by Lord Sankey LC in Woolmington v DPP:

Throughout the web of the English criminal law one golden thread is always to be seen—that it is the duty of the prosecution to prove the prisoner's guilt subject to what I have already said as to the defence of insanity and subject also to any statutory exception...

== Fundamental right ==
This right is considered important enough in modern democracies, constitutional monarchies and republics that many have explicitly included it in their legal codes and constitutions:

- The Universal Declaration of Human Rights, article 11, states: "Everyone charged with a penal offence has the right to be presumed innocent until proven guilty according to law in a public trial at which he has had all the guarantees necessary for his defense."
- The International Covenant on Civil and Political Rights, art. 14, paragraph 2 states that "Everyone charged with a criminal offence shall have the right to be presumed innocent until proved guilty according to law." The presumption of innocence is also expressly regulated in Art. 66 of the Rome Statute of the International Criminal Court, according to which "Everyone shall be presumed innocent until proved guilty before the Court in accordance with the applicable law."
- The Convention for the Protection of Human Rights and Fundamental Freedoms of the Council of Europe says (art. 6.2): "Everyone charged with a criminal offence shall be presumed innocent until proved guilty according to law." This convention has been adopted by treaty and is binding on all Council of Europe members. Currently (and in any foreseeable expansion of the EU) every country member of the European Union is also member to the Council of Europe, so this stands for EU members as a matter of course. Nevertheless, this assertion is iterated verbatim in Article 48 of the Charter of Fundamental Rights of the European Union.
- In the UK, the presumption of innocence is provided for by section 6 of the Human Rights Act 1998, which aims to incorporate the rights contained in the aforementioned European Convention on Human Rights.
- Articles 8 (1) and 8 (2) (right to a fair trial), in conjunction with Article 1 (1) (obligation to respect and ensure rights without discrimination), of the American Convention on Human Rights make the Inter-American Court to stress that "the presumption of innocence is a guiding principle in criminal trials and a foundational standard for the assessment of the evidence. Such assessment must be rational, objective, and impartial in order to disprove the presumption of innocence and generate certainty about criminal responsibility. ... The Court reiterated that, in criminal proceedings, the State bears the burden of proof. The accused is not obligated to affirmatively prove his innocence or to provide exculpatory evidence. To provide counterevidence or exculpatory evidence is a right that the defence may exercise in order to rebut the charges, which in turn the accusing party bears the burden of disproving".
- In Brazil, article 5th, item LVII of the Constitution states: "no one will be considered guilty until the final criminal sentence is reached".
- In Canada, section 11(d) of the Canadian Charter of Rights and Freedoms states: "Any person charged with an offence has the right to be presumed innocent until proven guilty according to law in a fair and public hearing by an independent and impartial tribunal".
- In the Colombian constitution, Title II, Chapter 1, Article 29 states that "Every person is presumed innocent until proven guilty according to the law".
- In France, article 9 of the Declaration of the Rights of Man and of the Citizen of 1789, which has force as constitutional law, begins: "Any man being presumed innocent until he has been declared guilty ..." The Code of Criminal Procedure states in its preliminary article that "any person suspected or prosecuted is presumed innocent for as long as their guilt has not been established" and the jurors' oath repeats this assertion (article 304; note that only the most serious crimes are tried by jury in France). A popular misconception is that, under French law, the accused is presumed guilty until proven innocent.
- In Iran, Article 37 of the Constitution of the Islamic Republic of Iran states: "Innocence is to be presumed, and no one is to be held guilty of a charge unless his or her guilt has been established by a competent court".
- In Italy, the second paragraph of Article 27 of the Constitution states: "A defendant shall be considered not guilty until a final sentence has been passed."
- In Romania, article 23 of the Constitution states that "any person shall be presumed innocent until found guilty by a final decision of the court".
- The Constitution of Russia, in article 49, states that "Everyone charged with a crime shall be considered not guilty until his or her guilt has been proven in conformity with the federal law and has been established by the valid sentence of a court of law". It also states that "The defendant shall not be obliged to prove his or her innocence" and "Any reasonable doubt shall be interpreted in favor of the defendant".
- In the South African Constitution, section 35(3)(h) of the Bill of Rights states: "Every accused person has a right to a fair trial, which includes the right to be presumed innocent, to remain silent, and not to testify during the proceedings."
- Although the Constitution of the United States does not cite it explicitly, presumption of innocence is widely held to follow from the Fifth, Sixth, and Fourteenth Amendments. The case of Coffin v. United States (1895) established the presumption of innocence of persons accused of crimes. See also In re Winship.
- In New Zealand, the New Zealand Bill of Rights 1990 provides at section 25 (c) "Everyone who is charged with an offence has, in relation to the determination of the charge, the following minimum rights: (c) the right to be presumed innocent until proved guilty according to law".
- In the European Union, in addition to the Charter of Fundamental Rights, presumption of innocence is also protected through Directive (EU) 2016/343 of the European Parliament and of the Council of the 9th March 2016 on the strengthening of certain aspects of the presumption of innocence and of the right to bepresent at the trial in criminal proceedings (Directive). Article 3 states that: Member States shall ensure that suspects and accused persons are presumed innocent until proved guilty according to law. The goal of the directive is stated in article 1. The scope is to lay down common minimum rules concerning:(a) certain aspects of the presumption of innocence in criminal proceedings;(b) the right to be present at the trial in criminal proceedings.
- In Vietnam, The 2013 Constitution of Vietnam, Article 31 subsection 1 states that "The accused is presumed innocent until proven guilty in accordance with legal procedures and by a court judgment that has taken legal effect". This can also be found in the 2015 Code of Criminal Procedure.

== Modern practices ==
=== United Kingdom ===
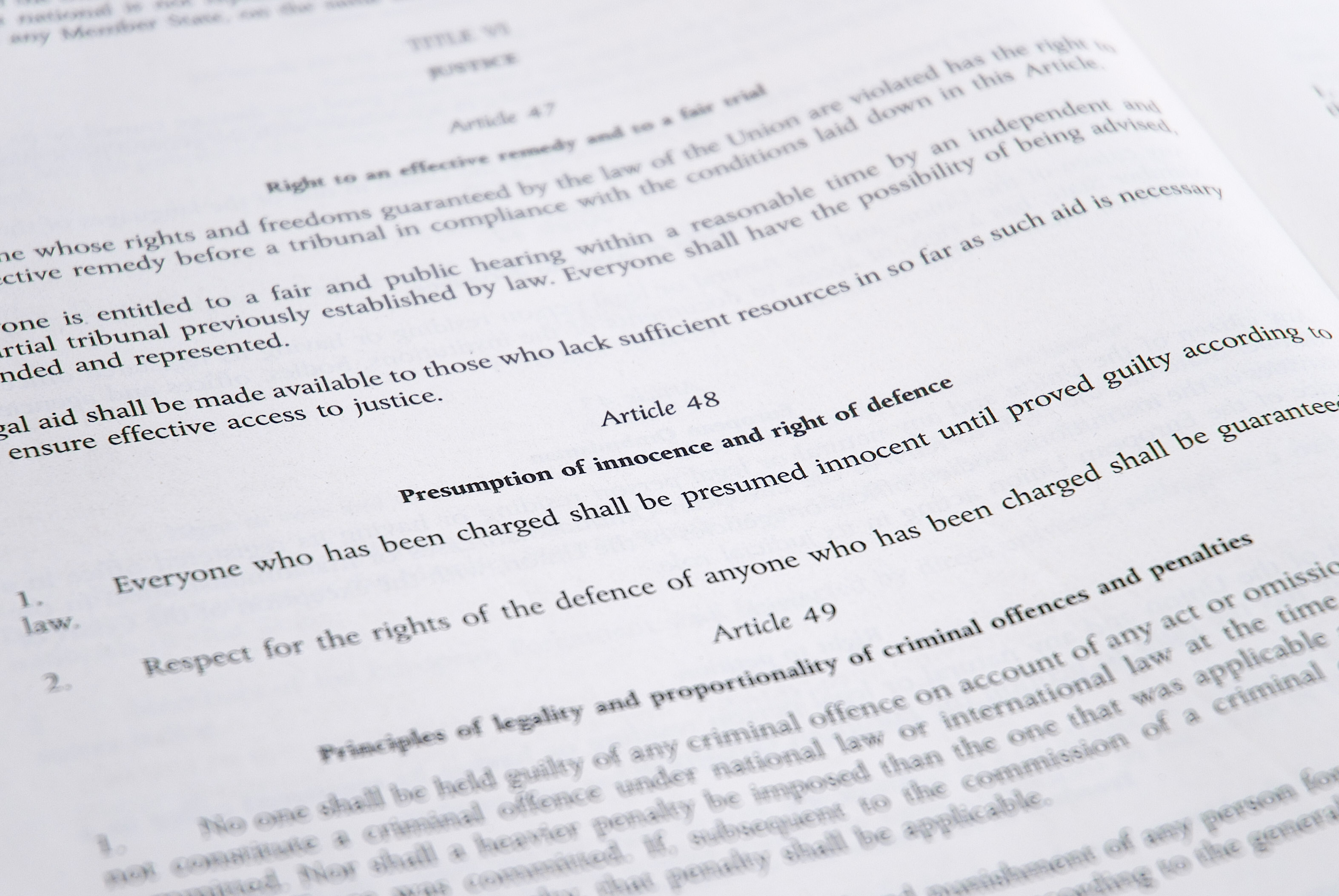
Article 48 of the Charter of Fundamental Rights of the European Union affirms the right to the presumption of innocence.

In the United Kingdom changes have been made affecting this principle. Defendants' previous convictions may in certain circumstances be revealed to juries. Although the suspect is not compelled to answer questions after formal arrest, failure to give information may now be prejudicial at trial. Statute law also exists which provides for criminal penalties for failing to decrypt data on request from the police. If the suspect is unwilling to do so, it is an offence. Citizens can therefore be convicted and imprisoned without any evidence that the encrypted material was unlawful. Furthermore, in sexual offence cases such as rape, where the sexual act has already been proved beyond reasonable doubt, there are a limited number of circumstances where the defendant has an obligation to adduce evidence that the complainant consented to the sexual act, or that the defendant reasonably believed that the complainant was consenting. These circumstances include, for example, where the complainant was unconscious, unlawfully detained, or subjected to violence.

=== Canada ===
In Canadian law, the presumption of innocence has been reinforced in certain instances. The Criminal Code previously contained numerous provisions according to which defences to certain offences were subject to a reverse onus: that is, if an accused wishes to make that defence, they had to prove the facts of the defence to a balance of probabilities, rather than the Crown having to disprove the defence beyond a reasonable doubt. This meant that an accused in some circumstances might be convicted even if a reasonable doubt existed about their guilt. In several cases, various reverse onus provisions were found to violate the presumption of innocence provision of the Canadian Charter of Rights and Freedoms. They were replaced with procedures in which the accused merely had to demonstrate an "air of reality" to the proposed defence, following which the burden shifted to the Crown to disprove the defence.

Bill C-51, An Act to amend the Criminal Code and the Department of Justice Act and to make consequential amendments to another Act, received Royal Assent in December 2018. Among other things, it eliminated several reverse onus provisions from the Criminal Code, some of which had previously been found unconstitutional, and others pre-emptively in order to avoid further Charter challenges.

== Defendants who are not individual natural persons ==
According to the American legal scholar William Meade Fletcher, “On the trial of a corporation, charged with crime, the same rules relative to the presumption of innocence, burden of proof and sufficiency of evidence would seem to apply as if the defendant were a natural person.” On the other hand, Canadian legal scholar Roger Shiner has written that the presumption of innocence should not be applied to corporations charged with “reverse onus” offenses, which are offenses where a statute reverses the usual burden of proof.

Shiner’s exception to the presumption of innocence has not been implemented, in the Philippines for example, where "the right to be presumed innocent remains a bedrock of Philippine criminal law, and there is no compelling reason why this right is to be abandoned by the mere fact that a criminal defendant is a corporation," according to Philippine legal scholar Jonas Cruz. However, Cruz acknowledged a contrary obiter dictum from the Supreme Court of the Philippines in a 1991 case.

== See also ==
- Adversarial system
- Due process
- False accusation
- Habeas corpus
- Hitchens's razor
- Null hypothesis
- Presumption of guilt
- Rebuttable presumption
- Right to a fair trial
- Right to silence
- Trial by media
- Presumption of supply in New Zealand
